= United Kingdom and the euro =

The United Kingdom did not seek to adopt the euro as its official currency for the duration of its membership of the European Union (EU), and secured an opt-out at the euro's creation via the Maastricht Treaty in 1992, wherein the Bank of England would only be a member of the European System of Central Banks.

United Kingdom opinion polls showed that the majority of British people were against adopting the euro; and in a June 2016 referendum, the United Kingdom voted to withdraw from the EU, significantly reducing any chance of future adoption. On 31 January 2020, the United Kingdom left the EU.

Despite never being a member of the eurozone, the euro is used in Akrotiri and Dhekelia, and widely accepted in Gibraltar and Northern Ireland. Furthermore, during its membership in the EU, London was home to the majority of the euro's clearing houses.

== History ==
=== Convergences and criteria ===
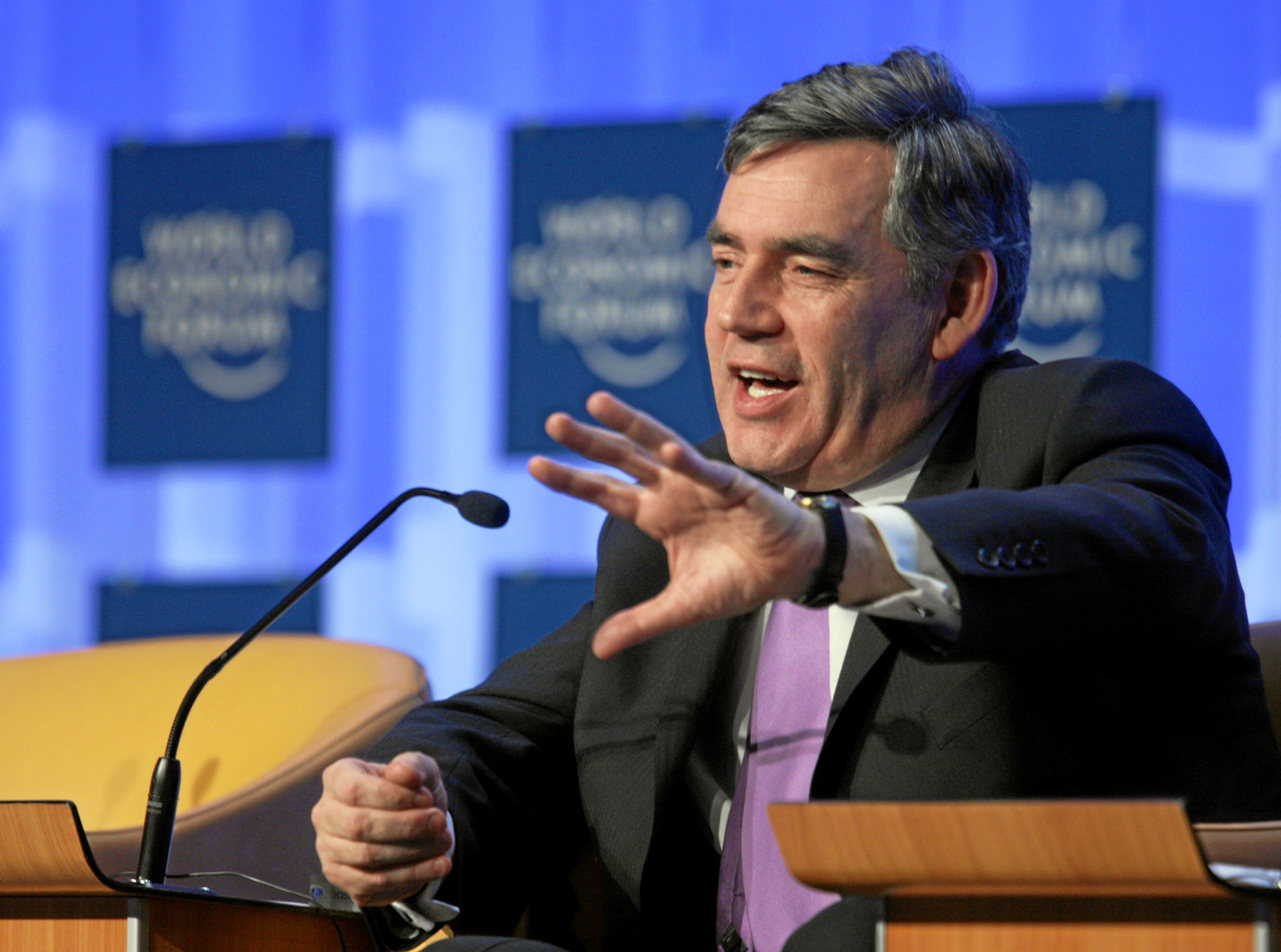
Gordon Brown set out the 'five economic tests' that must be met before the UK would adopt the euro.

The United Kingdom joined the European Exchange Rate Mechanism (ERM), a prerequisite for adopting the euro, in October 1990. The UK spent over £6 billion trying to keep its currency, the pound sterling, within the narrow limits prescribed by ERM, but was forced to exit the programme within two years after the pound sterling came under major pressure from currency speculators. The ensuing crash of 16 September 1992 was subsequently dubbed "Black Wednesday." During the negotiations of the Maastricht Treaty of 1992, the UK secured an opt-out from adopting the euro.

The government of Prime Minister Tony Blair declared that "five economic tests" must be passed before the government could recommend the UK joining the euro and promised to hold a referendum on membership if those five economic tests were met. Her Majesty's Treasury first assessed five economic tests in October 1997, when it was decided that the UK economy was neither sufficiently converged with that of the rest of the EU, nor sufficiently flexible, to justify a recommendation of membership at that time. Another assessment was published on 9 June 2003 by Gordon Brown, when he was Chancellor of the Exchequer. Though maintaining the government's positive view on the euro, the report opposed membership because four out of the five tests were not passed. However, the 2003 document also noted the considerable progress of the UK towards satisfying the five tests since 1997, and the desirability of making policy decisions to adapt the UK economy to better satisfy the tests in future. It cited considerable long-term benefits to be gained from eventual, prudently conducted Economic and Monetary Union (EMU) membership.

The UK would also have to meet the EU's economic convergence criteria (Maastricht criteria) before being allowed to adopt the euro; at that time the UK's annual government deficit to the gross domestic product (GDP) was above the defined threshold. The government committed itself to a triple-approval procedure before joining the eurozone, involving approval by the Cabinet, Parliament, and the electorate in a referendum.

=== Rule out ===
Brown, Blair's successor, ruled out membership in 2007, saying that the decision not to join had been correct for Britain and for Europe. In December 2008, José Barroso, the President of the European Commission, told French radio that some British politicians were considering the move because of the effects of the 2008 financial crisis. Brown denied that there was any change in official policy. In February 2009, Monetary Policy Affairs Commissioner Joaquín Almunia said "the chance that the British pound sterling will join: high."

The UK released new coin designs in 2008 following the Royal Mint's biggest redesign of the national currency since decimalisation in 1971. German news magazine Der Spiegel saw this as an indication that the country has no intention of switching to the euro within the foreseeable future.

In the UK general election 2010, the Liberal Democrats increased their share of the vote, but lost seats. One of their aims was to see the UK rejoining ERM II and eventually joining the euro, but when a coalition was formed between the Liberal Democrats and the Conservatives, the Liberal Democrats agreed that the UK would not join the euro during this term of government.

=== Withdrawal ===
Following the election of a majority-Conservatives government in the subsequent election, a referendum on EU membership itself was held, and the result was in favour of leaving the EU. Since the UK has withdrawn from the EU, euro adoption is practically impossible. Even if government and/or public opinion were to change, the EU's position is that third countries would only adopt the euro through membership of the EU.

== Usage ==
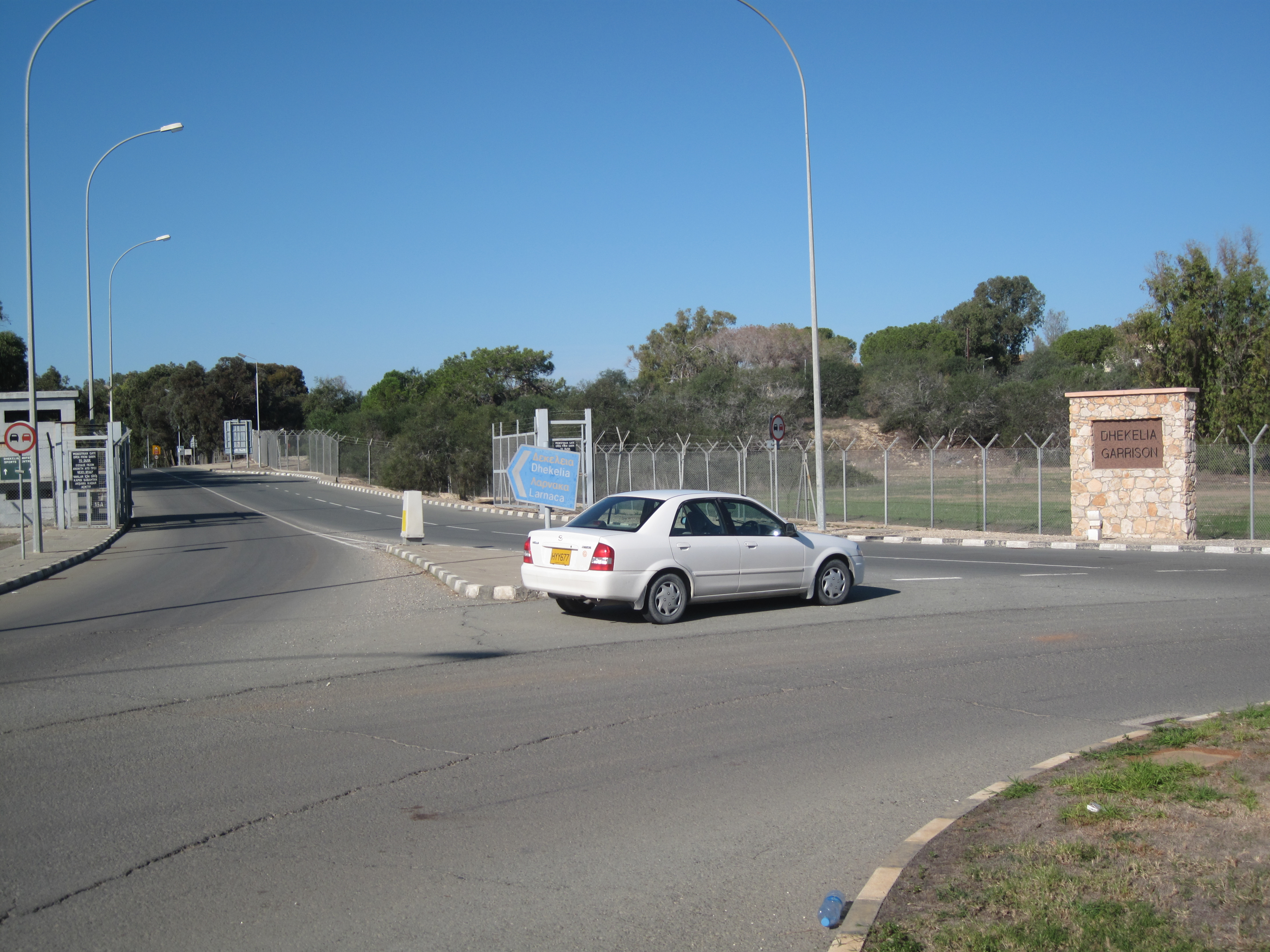
The UK's Cypriot bases are the only part of the UK to officially use the euro.

=== Akrotiri and Dhekelia ===
The Sovereign Base Areas of Akrotiri and Dhekelia on the island of Cyprus introduced the euro at the same time as the Republic of Cyprus, on 1 January 2008. Previously, they used the Cypriot Pound. Since the independence of Cyprus, treaties dictate that British territories in Cyprus will have the same currency as the Republic of Cyprus. These are the only places under British control where the euro is legal tender. They do not issue separate euro coins. Following the British vote to withdraw from the EU in June 2016, Ioannis Kasoulidis, Foreign Minister of Cyprus, announced that Cyprus wished to have EU citizen privileges remain for these areas if the UK ceases to be a member.

=== Gibraltar ===
The currency of Gibraltar is the Gibraltar pound, issued by His Majesty's Government of Gibraltar. Unofficially, most retail outlets in Gibraltar also accept the euro, though some payphones and the Royal Gibraltar Post Office, along with all other government offices, do not.

=== Clearing ===
London is home to three-quarters of all euro clearing in the world, to a value of €927 billion (2017 figure). The second largest hub is Paris, which operates 11% of clearing. In light of the UK's withdrawal from the EU, the EU is looking at whether these operations should be forced to move from London to within the EU so the activities could be regulated by the European Central Bank. The European Union agreed to prolong until 30 June 2025 permission for Britain's clearing houses to continue serving customers in the EU but officials say that this will be the "final extension". A further extension was granted in January 2025, with a new deadline set for June 2028.

== Exchange rate ==
In June 2003, Brown stated that the best exchange rate for the UK to join the euro would be around 73 pence per euro. On 26 May 2003, the euro had reached 72.1 pence, a value not exceeded until 21 December 2007. During the final months of 2008, the pound declined in value dramatically against the euro. The euro rose above 80 pence and peaked at 97.855 pence on 29 December 2008. This compares with its value between March and October 2008, when the value of the euro was about 78 pence, and its value of about 70 pence between April 2003 and August 2007. With the impact of the 2008 financial crisis on the British economy, including failing banks and plunging UK property values, some British analysts stated that adopting the euro was far preferable to any other possible solutions for Britain's economic problems. There was some media discussion about the possibility of adopting the euro. On 29 December 2008, the BBC reported that the euro had reached roughly 97.7 pence, due to poorer economic forecasts. This report stated that many analysts believed that parity with the euro was only a matter of time.

At that time, some shops in Northern Ireland accepted the euro at parity, causing a large influx of shoppers from across the Irish border. This made some shops the most successful in their company for several weeks. Alex Salmond, the then First Minister of Scotland, called for more Scottish businesses to accept the euro to encourage tourism from the eurozone, noting that this is already done by organisations such as Historic Scotland.

During 2009, the value of the euro against the pound fluctuated between 96.1 pence on 2 January and 84.255 pence on 22 June. In 2010, the value of the euro against the pound fluctuated between 91.140 pence on 10 March and 81.040 pence on 29 June. On 31 December 2010, the euro closed at 86.075 pence. A report in Britain's Daily Telegraph argued that the high euro had caused problems in the eurozone outside Germany.

There was a fairly steady decline in the euro rate during 2013, 2014 and 2015 from 85 pence to 70 pence. During 2016, the pound declined against several currencies, meaning the euro rose, especially on 24 June 2016 (because of the EU referendum) when the euro rose from 76 pence to 82 pence and further the following days.

== Considerations on membership ==
Eurozone participation European Union member states (special territories not shown) 21 in the eurozone 1 in ERM II, with an opt-out (Denmark) 5 not in ERM II, but committed to join the eurozone after meeting the convergence criteria (Czech Republic, Hungary, Poland, Romania, and Sweden) Non–EU member states 4 using the euro with a monetary agreement (Andorra, Monaco, San Marino, and Vatican City) 2 using the euro unilaterally (Kosovo and Montenegro)

While the UK remained an EU member, its membership in the eurozone was only possible if it decided to drop its opt-out. Over the years, considerations on the impact of membership weighed heavily.

=== Economics ===
Some believed that removing the UK's ability to set its own interest rates would have detrimental effects on its economy. One argument was that currency flexibility is a vital tool and that the sharp devaluation of sterling in 2008 was just what Britain needed to rebalance its economy. Another objection is that many continental European governments have large unfunded pension liabilities. Opponents feared that if Britain adopted the euro, these liabilities could put a debt burden on the British taxpayer, though others have dismissed this argument as spurious. One of the underlying issues that stand in the way of monetary union is the structural difference between the UK housing market and those of many continental European countries.

The entry of the UK into the eurozone would have likely resulted in increased trade with the other members of the eurozone. It could also have had a stabilising effect on the stock market prices in the UK. A simulation of the entry in 1999 indicated that it would have had an overall positive, though small, long-term effect on the UK's GDP if the entry had been made with the rate of exchange of the pound to the euro at that time. With a lower rate of exchange, the entry would have had more clearly a positive effect on the UK's GDP. A 2009 study about the effect of an entry in the coming years claimed that the effect would likely be positive, improving the stability for the UK economy.

An interesting parallel can be seen in the 19th century discussions concerning the possibility of the UK joining the Latin Monetary Union.

=== Public opinion ===
The wording of the question may have varied, but the figures showed that a majority of British people have been consistently against adopting the euro.

Date	YES	NO	Unsure	Number of participants	Held by	Ref
November 2000	18%	71%	N/A	N/A	BBC	
January 2002	31%	56%	N/A	N/A	BBC	
9–10 June 2003	33%	61%	7%	1852	YouGov	
10–15 February 2005	26%	57%	16%	2103	Ipsos MORI	
11–12 December 2008	24%	59%	17%	2098	YouGov	
19–21 December 2008	23%	71%	6%	1000	ICM	
6–9 January 2009	24%	64%	12%	2157	YouGov	
17–18 April 2010	21%	65%	14%	1433	YouGov	
2–4 July 2011	8%	81%	11%	2002	Angus Reid	
9–12 August 2011	9%	85%	6%	2700	YouGov	
10 August 2012	6%	81%	13%	2004	Angus Reid	
4-20 February 2020	11%	64%	18%	1578	YouGov	
11-15 June 2026	24.3%	63%	12.7%	3039	Convergent Opinion	

View source data.

=== Sterling zone ===
If the UK had joined the eurozone, this would have affected the Crown dependencies and some British overseas territories that also use the pound sterling, or which have a currency on a par with sterling. In the Crown Dependencies, the Isle of Man, Jersey, Guernsey, and Alderney, pounds all share the ISO 4217 code GBP. In the British Overseas Territories, Gibraltar, Falkland Islands, British Indian Ocean Territory and Saint Helena, pounds are also fixed so that £1 in the local currency equals £1 in sterling. The British Antarctic Territory and South Georgia and the South Sandwich Islands do not have their own currencies and use the pound sterling.

When France adopted the euro, so did the French overseas departments and territories that used the French franc. The CFP franc, CFA franc, and Comorian franc, that are used in overseas territories and some African countries, had fixed exchange rates with the French franc, but not at par – for various historical reasons, they were worth considerably less, at 1 French franc = 18.2 CFP francs, 75 Comorian francs or 100 CFA francs. The CFA franc and Comorian franc are linked to the euro at fixed rates with free convertibility maintained at the expense of the French Treasury. The CFP franc is linked to the euro at a fixed rate.

It was suggested that the sterling zone territories would, in the event of the UK adopting the euro, have four options:

- Officially adopt the euro as a non-EU member and issue a distinct national variant of the euro—just as Monaco and Vatican City have done. The EU has only allowed sovereign states to adopt this approach to date. Also, it has demanded that monetary agreements be entered into by non-EU members who wish to issue their own euro coinage, and prevented Andorra from issuing their own coins until the agreement was signed. Such agreements, the EU has stated, must include adherence to EU banking and finance regulation.
- Use standard euro coins issued by the UK and other eurozone countries. This may be perceived by some as losing an important symbol of independence.
- Maintain their existing currency, but peg at a fixed rate with the euro. Maintaining a fixed rate against currency speculators can be extremely expensive, as the UK found on Black Wednesday.
- Adopt a free-floating currency, or a currency fixed to another currency, as the Jersey government had hinted.

Gibraltar was in a different position, being within the EU as part of the UK's membership. If the UK were to have adopted the euro it might not have been possible to implement an opt-out for Gibraltar or whether it would have had a separate referendum.

==== Isle of Man ====
It was the Manx Government's position that, if the United Kingdom had decided to participate in the euro, then it would be likely that the Isle of Man (which has its own currency, the Manx pound) would also choose to participate. Tynwald passed the Currency Act 1992 as part of preparations for the event that the UK decided to adopt the euro. In such a scenario, the Isle of Man wished to retain the right to issue its own currency, believing it to be an important public statement of independence. Retaining the island's own coinage also enables the Isle of Man Treasury to continue to benefit from the accrual of interest on the issued money (seigniorage). The Currency Act allows for the issue of a Manx euro currency at parity with the euro, referred to as a "substitute euro", which has an Isle of Man inscription on the obverse side of the coins. This proposal would essentially have replaced the "substitute sterling" with a "substitute euro", as they would have functioned in the same way. Manx versions of the euro coins and euro banknotes were designed. While the European Union is not obliged to accept the Manx desire to introduce a special Manx version of the euro, the Isle of Man could arguably introduce a currency pegged to the euro (akin to its situation now vis-à-vis the pound sterling, or the former relationship between the euro and the Bulgarian lev). There is no precedent for divergent national versions, beyond customising the national side of euro coins in the same way as other eurozone members.

=== Banknotes ===
Some private sector banks in Scotland and Northern Ireland issue banknotes of their own design. The Banking Act, 2008 amended the rights of Scottish and Northern Irish banks to produce banknotes. This does not apply in Wales which uses Bank of England notes.

In November 1999, in preparation for the introduction of the euro notes and coins across the eurozone, the European Central Bank announced a total ban on the issuing of banknotes by entities that were not national central Banks ("Legal Protection of Banknotes in the European Union Member States"). A move from sterling to the euro would have ended the circulation of sub-national banknotes as all euro banknotes of a given denomination have an identical design. However, as national variation is a requisite of euro coins, it would have remained an option for the Royal Mint to incorporate the symbols of the Home Nations into its designs for the British national sides of euro coinage.

=== Convergence criteria ===
Aside from approval in a domestic referendum, the UK would be required to meet the euro convergence criteria before being granted approval to adopt the euro. As of the last report by the European Central Bank in May 2018, the UK met 1 of 5 of the criteria.

Convergence criteria
Assessment date	Country	HICP inflation rate (Note: The rate of change of the 12-month average HICP over the prior 12-month average must be no more than 1.5% larger than the unweighted arithmetic average of the similar HICP inflation rates in the 3 EU member states with the lowest HICP inflation. If any of these 3 states have a HICP rate significantly below the similarly averaged HICP rate for the eurozone (which according to ECB practice means more than 2% below), and if this low HICP rate has been primarily caused by exceptional circumstances (i.e. severe wage cuts or a strong recession), then such a state is not included in the calculation of the reference value and is replaced by the EU state with the fourth lowest HICP rate.)	Excessive deficit procedure		Exchange rate		Long-term interest rate (Note: The arithmetic average of the annual yield of 10-year government bonds as of the end of the past 12 months must be no more than 2.0% larger than the unweighted arithmetic average of the bond yields in the 3 EU member states with the lowest HICP inflation. If any of these states have bond yields which are significantly larger than the similarly averaged yield for the eurozone (which according to previous ECB reports means more than 2% above) and at the same time does not have complete funding access to financial markets (which is the case for as long as a government receives bailout funds), then such a state is not to be included in the calculation of the reference value.)	Compatibility of legislation
Assessment date	Country	HICP inflation rate	Budget deficit to GDP	Debt-to-GDP ratio	ERM II member	Change in rate (Note: The change in the annual average exchange rate against the euro.)	Long-term interest rate	Compatibility of legislation
2012 ECB Report (Note: Reference values from the ECB convergence report of May 2012.)	Reference values	Max. 3.1% (Note: Sweden, Ireland and Slovenia were the reference states.) (as of 31 Mar 2012)	None open (as of 31 Mar 2012)		Min. 2 years (as of 31 Mar 2012)	Max. ±15% (Note: The maximum allowed change in rate is ± 2.25% for Denmark.) (for 2011)	Max. 5.80% (Note: Sweden and Slovenia were the reference states, with Ireland excluded as an outlier.) (as of 31 Mar 2012)	Compliant (as of 31 Mar 2012)
2012 ECB Report	Reference values	Max. 3.1% (as of 31 Mar 2012)	Max. 3.0% (FY 2011)	Max. 60% (FY 2011)	Min. 2 years (as of 31 Mar 2012)	Max. ±15% (for 2011)	Max. 5.80% (as of 31 Mar 2012)	Compliant (as of 31 Mar 2012)
2012 ECB Report	United Kingdom	4.3%	Open		No	-1.2%	2.49%	Not assessed
2012 ECB Report	United Kingdom	4.3%	8.3%	85%	No	-1.2%	2.49%	Not assessed
2013 ECB Report (Note: Reference values from the ECB convergence report of June 2013.)	Reference values	Max. 2.7% (Note: Sweden, Latvia and Ireland were the reference states.) (as of 30 Apr 2013)	None open (as of 30 Apr 2013)		Min. 2 years (as of 30 Apr 2013)	Max. ±15% (for 2012)	Max. 5.5% (as of 30 Apr 2013)	Compliant (as of 30 Apr 2013)
2013 ECB Report	Reference values	Max. 2.7% (as of 30 Apr 2013)	Max. 3.0% (FY 2012)	Max. 60% (FY 2012)	Min. 2 years (as of 30 Apr 2013)	Max. ±15% (for 2012)	Max. 5.5% (as of 30 Apr 2013)	Compliant (as of 30 Apr 2013)
2013 ECB Report	United Kingdom	2.6%	Open		No	6.6%	1.62%	Not assessed
2013 ECB Report	United Kingdom	2.6%	6.3%	90.0%	No	6.6%	1.62%	Not assessed
2014 ECB Report (Note: Reference values from the ECB convergence report of June 2014.)	Reference values	Max. 1.7% (Note: Latvia, Portugal and Ireland were the reference states, with Greece, Bulgaria and Cyprus excluded as outliers.) (as of 30 Apr 2014)	None open (as of 30 Apr 2014)		Min. 2 years (as of 30 Apr 2014)	Max. ±15% (for 2013)	Max. 6.2% (Note: Latvia, Ireland and Portugal were the reference states.) (as of 30 Apr 2014)	Compliant (as of 30 Apr 2014)
2014 ECB Report	Reference values	Max. 1.7% (as of 30 Apr 2014)	Max. 3.0% (FY 2013)	Max. 60% (FY 2013)	Min. 2 years (as of 30 Apr 2014)	Max. ±15% (for 2013)	Max. 6.2% (as of 30 Apr 2014)	Compliant (as of 30 Apr 2014)
2014 ECB Report	United Kingdom	2.2%	Open		No	-4.7%	2.25%	Not assessed
2014 ECB Report	United Kingdom	2.2%	5.8%	90.6%	No	-4.7%	2.25%	Not assessed
2016 ECB Report (Note: Reference values from the ECB convergence report of June 2016.)	Reference values	Max. 0.7% (Note: Bulgaria, Slovenia and Spain were the reference states, with Cyprus and Romania excluded as outliers.) (as of 30 Apr 2016)	None open (as of 18 May 2016)		Min. 2 years (as of 18 May 2016)	Max. ±15% (for 2015)	Max. 4.0% (Note: Slovenia, Spain and Bulgaria were the reference states.) (as of 30 Apr 2016)	Compliant (as of 18 May 2016)
2016 ECB Report	Reference values	Max. 0.7% (as of 30 Apr 2016)	Max. 3.0% (FY 2015)	Max. 60% (FY 2015)	Min. 2 years (as of 18 May 2016)	Max. ±15% (for 2015)	Max. 4.0% (as of 30 Apr 2016)	Compliant (as of 18 May 2016)
2016 ECB Report	United Kingdom	0.1%	Open		No	10.0%	1.8%	Not assessed
2016 ECB Report	United Kingdom	0.1%	4.4%	89.2%	No	10.0%	1.8%	Not assessed
2018 ECB Report (Note: Reference values from the ECB convergence report of May 2018.)	Reference values	Max. 1.9% (Note: Cyprus, Ireland and Finland were the reference states.) (as of 31 Mar 2018)	None open (as of 3 May 2018)		Min. 2 years (as of 3 May 2018)	Max. ±15% (for 2017)	Max. 3.2% (Note: Cyprus, Ireland and Finland were the reference states.) (as of 31 Mar 2018)	Compliant (as of 20 March 2018)
2018 ECB Report	Reference values	Max. 1.9% (as of 31 Mar 2018)	Max. 3.0% (FY 2017)	Max. 60% (FY 2017)	Min. 2 years (as of 3 May 2018)	Max. ±15% (for 2017)	Max. 3.2% (as of 31 Mar 2018)	Compliant (as of 20 March 2018)
2018 ECB Report	United Kingdom	2.8%	None		No	-7.0%	1.2%	Not assessed
2018 ECB Report	United Kingdom	2.8%	1.9%	87.7%	No	-7.0%	1.2%	Not assessed

Criterion fulfilled
Criterion potentially fulfilled: If the budget deficit exceeds the 3% limit, but is "close" to this value (the European Commission has deemed 3.5% to be close by in the past), then the criteria can still potentially be fulfilled if either the deficits in the previous two years are significantly declining towards the 3% limit, or if the excessive deficit is the result of exceptional circumstances which are temporary in nature (i.e. one-off expenditures triggered by a significant economic downturn, or by the implementation of economic reforms that are expected to deliver a significant positive impact on the government's future fiscal budgets). However, even if such "special circumstances" are found to exist, additional criteria must also be met to comply with the fiscal budget criterion. Additionally, if the debt-to-GDP ratio exceeds 60% but is "sufficiently diminishing and approaching the reference value at a satisfactory pace" it can be deemed to be in compliance.
Criterion not fulfilled

== See also ==
- Sterling area
- Enlargement of the eurozone
- Millions, a 2004 film in which the United Kingdom adopting the euro is a major plot point
- List of countries by leading trade partners
- List of the largest trading partners of the European Union
- List of the largest trading partners of United Kingdom
- United Kingdom–European Union relations
