= Vatican euro coins =

Type of Euro coins issued by the Vatican

Eurozone participation European Union member states (special territories not shown) 21 in the eurozone 1 in ERM II, with an opt-out (Denmark) 5 not in ERM II, but committed to join the eurozone after meeting the convergence criteria (Czech Republic, Hungary, Poland, Romania, and Sweden) Non–EU member states 4 using the euro with a monetary agreement (Andorra, Monaco, San Marino, and Vatican City) 2 using the euro unilaterally (Kosovo and Montenegro)

Vatican euro coins are issued by the Philatelic and Numismatic Office of the Vatican City State and minted by Istituto Poligrafico e Zecca dello Stato (IPZS), in Rome, Italy. The euro is the official currency of the Vatican City, although Vatican City is not a member of the eurozone or the European Union. All coins are inscribed with the word "Città del Vaticano", the year of issue and the twelve stars of Europe.

== Vatican euro design ==
For images of the common side and a detailed description of the coins, see euro coins.

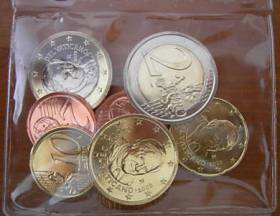
Starter kit of Vatican City euro coins (2008)

=== First series (2002–2005) ===
The initial series of Vatican euro coins featured an effigy of Pope John Paul II. They were issued only in collector sets and bore an extreme markup with the 2002 collector set costing well over a thousand euro.

Depiction of Vatican euro coinage (2002–2005) | Obverse side
€ 0.01	€ 0.02	€ 0.05
Effigy of John Paul II.
€ 0.10	€ 0.20	€ 0.50
Effigy of John Paul II.
€ 1.00	€ 2.00	€ 2 Coin Edge
		for a total of 12 stars
Effigy of John Paul II.		for a total of 12 stars

=== Second series (2005) ===
Following the death of Pope John Paul II in April 2005, Vatican City issued special coins during the period of Sede vacante depicting the emblem of the Apostolic Chamber (i.e. two crossed keys beneath an umbraculum, or umbrella) and the coat of arms of the Camerlengo of the Holy Roman Church, at the time Cardinal Eduardo Martínez Somalo.

Depiction of Vatican euro coinage (2005) | Obverse side
€ 0.01	€ 0.02	€ 0.05
Insignia of the Apostolic Chamber and the coat of arms of the Camerlengo of the Holy Roman Church
€ 0.10	€ 0.20	€ 0.50
Insignia of the Apostolic Chamber and the coat of arms of the Cardinal Chamberlain
€ 1.00	€ 2.00	€ 2 Coin Edge
		for a total of 12 stars
Insignia of the Apostolic Chamber and the coat of arms of the Cardinal Chamberlain		for a total of 12 stars

=== Third series (2006–2013) ===
When the new pope was elected, the third series of Vatican euro coins were issued on 27 April 2006 and feature the effigy of Pope Benedict XVI. The coins carry an inscription "Città del Vaticano" and the twelve stars of Europe. The details of this design are published in the Official Journal of the European Union.

Depiction of Vatican euro coinage (2006–2013) | Obverse side
€ 0.01	€ 0.02	€ 0.05
Effigy of Benedict XVI.
€ 0.10	€ 0.20	€ 0.50
Effigy of Benedict XVI.
€ 1.00	€ 2.00	€ 2 Coin Edge
		for a total of 12 stars
Effigy of Benedict XVI.		for a total of 12 stars

=== Fourth series (2014–2016) ===
A series of Vatican euro coins featuring effigies of Pope Francis was released in March 2014. Three different images of Francis were used.

Depiction of Vatican euro coinage (2014–2016) | Obverse side
€ 0.01	€ 0.02	€ 0.05
Effigy of Francis (left profile).
€ 0.10	€ 0.20	€ 0.50
Effigy of Francis (front profile).
€ 1.00	€ 2.00	€ 2 Coin Edge
		for a total of 12 stars
Effigy of Francis (right profile).		for a total of 12 stars

=== Fifth series (2017–2025) ===
As a result of Pope Francis no longer permitting that his effigies be used on coins, starting March 2017, the eight denominations of Vatican euro coins no longer bore the Pope's image but his papal coat of arms.

Depiction of Vatican euro coinage (2017-2025) | Obverse side
€ 0.01	€ 0.02	€ 0.05
Coat of arms of Pope Francis
€ 0.10	€ 0.20	€ 0.50
Coat of arms of Pope Francis
€ 1.00	€ 2.00	€ 2 Coin Edge
		for a total of 12 stars
Coat of arms of Pope Francis		for a total of 12 stars

=== Sixth series (2026–) ===
On 30 July 2026, the Governorate of the Vatican City State published the images of the new series of ordinary coins, following the election of Pope Leo XIV as Supreme Pontiff the previous year.

After 10 years, the pontiff's effigy is once again featured on coins, specifically on the € 1 and € 2 denominations and the € 0.10, € 0.20, and € 0.50 coins. The coat of arms of Pope Leo XIV is featured on the € 0.01, € 0.02, and € 0.05 coins. The € 2 coin, in addition to featuring the Pope's effigy, also features the distinctive elements of his coat of arms: the lily, a symbol of purity and Marian devotion, and the burning heart pierced by an arrow above a book, an emblem of Augustinian spirituality and the power of the Word of God, capable of transforming the human heart.

Depiction of Vatican euro coinage (2017-2025) | Obverse side
€ 0.01	€ 0.02	€ 0.05
Coat of arms of Pope Leo XIV
€ 0.10	€ 0.20	€ 0.50
Effigy of Leo XIV
€ 1.00	€ 2.00	€ 2 Coin Edge
		for a total of 12 stars
Effigy of Leo XIV	Effigy of Pope Leo XIV with elements of his coat of arms (lily, burning heart pierced by an arrow above a book)	for a total of 12 stars

== Circulating mintage quantities ==
Face Value	€0.01	€0.02	€0.05	€0.10	€0.20	€0.50	€1.00	€2.00
2002	6,000	6,000	6,000	6,000	6,000	6,000	6,000	6,000
2003	s	s	s	s	s	s	s	s
2004	s	s	s	s	s	s	s	s
2005	s	s	s	s	s	s	s	s
2005 SV	s	s	s	s	s	s	s	s
2006	s	s	s	s	s	s	s	s
2007	s	s	s	s	s	s	s	s
2008	6,400	6,400	6,400	6,400	6,400	6,400	6,400	6,400
2009	6,400	6,400	6,400	6,400	6,400	6,400	6,400	6,400
2010	s	s	s	s	s	2,190,704	s	s
2011	s	s	s	s	s	2,174,197	s	s
2012	s	s	s	s	s	1,604,690	s	s
2013	s	s	s	s	s	1,941,484	s	s
2014	s	s	s	s	s	1,488,376	s	s
2015	s	s	s	s	s	2,021,682	s	s
2016	s	s	s	s	s	2,207,676	s	s
2017	s	s	s	s	s	2,132,411	s	s
2018	s	s	s	s	s	2,147,169	s	s
2019	s	s	s	s	s	2,157,248	s	s
2020	s	s	s	s	s	1,816,540	s	s
2021	s	s	s	s	s	1,647,133	s	s
2022	s	s	s	s	s	1,896,411	s	s
2023	s	s	s	s	s	1,869,916	s	s
s: small quantities minted for sets only

== Future changes to national sides ==
The European Commission issued a recommendation on 19 December 2008, a common guideline for the national sides and the issuance of euro coins intended for circulation. One section of this recommendation stipulates that:

Article 5. Changes to the national sides of regular euro coins intended for circulation:

"... the designs used for the national sides of the euro coins intended for circulation denominated in euro or in cent should not be modified, except in cases where the Head of State referred to on a coin changes ... A temporary vacancy or the provisional occupation of the function of Head of State should not give the right to change the national sides of the regular euro coins intended for circulation."

This change means that there will be no more "Sede Vacante" series of the regular Vatican euro coins, although the issue of commemorative "Sede Vacante" series (usually gold and silver coins), being legal tender in Vatican City only, remains possible. Circulating €2 commemorative Sede Vacante coins would also be possible, if the Sede Vacante period occurs in a year in which Vatican City has not already released two €2 commemorative coins of another subject. Such coins were indeed minted for the Sede Vacantes of 2013 and 2025.

== Commemorative coins ==
Year	Subject	Volume
2004	75th anniversary of the Foundation of the Vatican City State	
2005	20th World Youth Day in Cologne	
2006	500th anniversary of the Swiss Pontifical Guard	
2007	80th anniversary of the birth of Benedict XVI	
2008	Year of the Apostile	
2009	International Year of Astronomy	
2010	Year of the Priests	
2011	XXVI World Youth Day in Madrid	
2012	7th World Meeting of the Families	
2013	Sede vacante	
2013	XXVIII World Youth Day in Rio de Janeiro	
2014	25 years since the fall of the Berlin Wall	
2015	8th Meeting of the Families	
2016	Bicentenary of the Vatican Gendarmerie	
2016	Jubilee of Mercy	
2017	1950th Anniversary of the Martyrdom of Saint Peter & Saint Paul	
2017	Centenary of the Fatima Apparitions	

== See also ==
- Philatelic and Numismatic Office of the Vatican City State
- Holy See–European Union relations
- Vatican lira
- Index of Vatican City-related articles
