= Andorra and the euro =

Adoption of the euro by Andorra

Eurozone participation European Union member states (special territories not shown) 21 in the eurozone 1 in ERM II, with an opt-out (Denmark) 5 not in ERM II, but committed to join the eurozone after meeting the convergence criteria (Czech Republic, Hungary, Poland, Romania, and Sweden) Non–EU member states 4 using the euro with a monetary agreement (Andorra, Monaco, San Marino, and Vatican City) 2 using the euro unilaterally (Kosovo and Montenegro)

Andorra has a monetary agreement with the European Union allowing it to make the euro its official currency, and permitting it to issue euro coins from 1 July 2013. They planned to issue their first coins by March or April 2014. On 23 December 2014, coins were delivered for pre-booked customers at the Government Administration Building, and actual circulation began on 15 January 2015. Although the euro is the official currency of Andorra, Andorra is not a member of the eurozone or the European Union.

== Background ==
Andorra did not have an official currency before adopting the euro, and unlike its two larger neighbours, France and Spain, which surround it, it is not a member of the EU.

In the 20th century, both the French franc and Spanish peseta were used and accepted in Andorra, but the peseta was more widespread with government budgets, salaries and bank deposits mostly being in pesetas. When those two currencies were replaced by the euro between 1999 and 2002, the euro became the sole currency in Andorra.

Unlike the three other European microstates outside of the EU, Monaco, San Marino and the Vatican City, which adopted the euro when it was introduced, Andorra did not conclude a monetary agreement with the EU but rather used it unilaterally. These agreements gave the three microstates the right to issue their own euro coins, which have a common design on one side, and a national-specific side on the other. As with coins minted in other eurozone states, the microstate coins are valid across the eurozone; however they do not gain representation on the euro's governing bodies, the European Central Bank (ECB) and the Eurogroup. In 2003 Andorra requested that the EU conclude a monetary agreement with it which would give it the right to mint its own coins.

== Currency agreements ==
In 2004 the Council of the European Union adopted its negotiating position with Andorra. Following Andorra's agreement to abide by Council Directive 2003/48/EC on taxation of savings income in the form of interest payments, the Commission recommended opening negotiations. Negotiations were expected to be concluded by 2008, but were repeatedly stalled due in part to poor relations stemming from Andorra's tax haven status. A monetary agreement was eventually agreed to by Andorra and the EU in February 2011, and the agreement was signed on 30 June 2011. After the agreement came into force on 1 April 2012, the euro became Andorra's official currency. Andorra would have been permitted to issue up to 2.4 million euro coins from 1 July 2013 onwards provided that it complied with the agreement's terms.

In October 2012, Jordi Cinca, Andorra's Minister of Finance, stated that 1 January 2014 was a more likely date to start issuing euros due to delays in adopting the legislation required by the monetary agreement. In February 2013, the Director of the Mint of Andorra Jordi Puigdemasa confirmed that Andorra would not begin issuing euros until 1 January 2014. However, the EU did not approve the minting of the coins until December 2013, thus their release was delayed. Minister of Culture Stephen Albert was optimistic that the coins would be circulating by March or April 2014. By May, with still no euros issued, Cinca said that they had again been delayed but would be in circulation by the end of 2014. He cited complications from having the minting of the coins being split between the French and Spanish mints, and efforts to ensure that the coins made it into circulation, rather than to collectors, for the delay. The currency of the 2014 vintage presented on 23 December 2014 was all coined in Spain. France was instead awarded the minting order in 2015. The actual circulation began on 15 January 2015.

== Andorran euro design ==
A design competition for the national side of the euro coins was launched on 19 March 2013, with a deadline of 16 April. The winning designs were announced on 16 May and depict a Pyrenean chamois and a bearded vulture on the 1, 2 and 5 euro cent pieces, the Church of Santa Coloma d'Andorra and a depiction of Christ from the church Sant Martí de la Cortinada on the 10, 20, and 50 euro cent pieces, and Casa de la Vall on the 1 euro piece. The government had previously decided that the Coat of arms of Andorra would be featured on the 2 euro piece. Final approval of the coins was in late June, at which point they were forwarded to the EU for their consent. In August, a spokesperson for Cinca confirmed that the design of the 10, 20 and 50 euro cent pieces had been modified to remove the depiction of Christ due to objections from the European Commission on the grounds of religious neutrality.

Depiction of Andorran euro coinage | Obverse side
€0.01	€0.02	€0.05
A Pyrenean chamois and a bearded vulture
€0.10	€0.20	€0.50
The Church of Santa Coloma d'Andorra
€1.00	€2.00	€2 Coin Edge
		for a total of 12 stars
The Casa de la Vall	The Coat of arms of Andorra	for a total of 12 stars

== Circulating mintage quantities ==
Face Value	€0.01	€0.02	€0.05	€0.10	€0.20	€0.50	€1.00	€2.00
2014	60,000	60,000	860,000	860,000	860,000	340,000	511,843	360,000
2015	s	s	s	s	s	s	s	200,000
2016	s	s	s	s	s	s	2,339,200	s
2017	2,582,395	1,515,000	2,191,421	1,103,000	1,213,000	968,800	s	794,588
2018	3,430,000	2,550,000	1,800,000	980,000	1,014,000	890,000	s	868,000
2019	2,447,000	1,727,000	2,100,000	1,610,000	1,570,000	930,000	s	1,058,310
2020	s	s	s	860,000	175,000	740,000	s	1,500,000
2021	200,000	700,000	s	1,400,000	1,420,000	600,000	50,000	1,474,500
2022	700,000	450,000	400,000	700,000	700,000	380,000	s	1,708,000
2023	s	s	s	s	s	s	s	2,075,250
2024	s	900,300	1,950,000	1,000,000	700,000	500,000	1,950,000	1,601,200
s Small quantities minted for sets only

=== Mints ===
Even years: Spain
Odd years: France

== Commemorative coins ==
Year	Subject	Volume

== See also ==
- Andorra–European Union relations
