= Czech Republic and the euro =

Eurozone participation European Union member states (special territories not shown) 21 in the eurozone 1 in ERM II, with an opt-out (Denmark) 5 not in ERM II, but committed to join the eurozone after meeting the convergence criteria (Czech Republic, Hungary, Poland, Romania, and Sweden) Non–EU member states 4 using the euro with a monetary agreement (Andorra, Monaco, San Marino, and Vatican City) 2 using the euro unilaterally (Kosovo and Montenegro)

The Czech Republic is bound to adopt the euro in the future and join the eurozone once it satisfies the euro convergence criteria by the Treaty of Accession after joining the European Union (EU) in 2004. The country is therefore a candidate for the enlargement of the eurozone. At present, the Czech Republic uses the Czech koruna as its currency, regulated by the Czech National Bank, a member of the European System of Central Banks, and does not participate in European Exchange Rate Mechanism II (ERM II).

Although the Czech Republic is economically well positioned to adopt the euro, following the European debt crisis there has been considerable opposition among the public. There is no target date by the government for joining the ERM II or adopting the euro. The cabinet that was formed following the 2017 legislative election did not plan to proceed with euro adoption within its term, and this policy was continued by the succeeding cabinet formed after the 2021 election. However, by 2024, President Petr Pavel had called on the government to take concrete steps in adopting the euro.

== History ==
=== European Union accession and 2000s ===
EUR–CZK exchange rate since 1999

The European Union membership referendum in 2003 approved the country's accession with 77.3% in favour, and in 2004 the Czech Republic joined the EU.

Since joining the EU in May 2004, the Czech Republic has adopted fiscal and monetary policies that aim to align its macroeconomic conditions with the rest of the European Union. Initially, the Czech Republic planned to adopt the euro as its official currency in 2010, however evaluations in 2006 found this date to be unlikely and the target date was postponed indefinitely. In February 2007, the Finance Minister said 2012 was a "realistic" date, but by November 2007 this was said to be too soon. In August 2008, an assessment said that adoption was not expected before 2015 due to political reluctance on the subject. However, in October 2009, the then Finance Minister, Eduard Janota, stated that 2015 was no longer realistic. In June 2008, the Central bank governor Zdeněk Tůma speculated about 2019.

In late 2010 a discussion arose within the Czech government, partially initiated by then President Václav Klaus, a well known eurosceptic, over negotiating an opt-out from joining the eurozone. Czech Prime Minister Petr Nečas later stated that no opt-out was required because the Czech Republic could not be forced to join the ERM II and thus could decide if or when to fulfill one of the necessary criteria to join the eurozone, an approach similar to the one taken by Sweden. Nečas also stated that his cabinet would not decide upon joining the euro during its term.

=== 2010s ===
The European debt crisis further decreased the Czech Republic's interest in joining the eurozone. Nečas said that since the conditions governing the eurozone had significantly changed since their accession treaty was ratified, he believed that Czechs should be able to decide by a referendum whether to join the eurozone under the new terms. One of the government's junior coalition parties, TOP09, was opposed to a euro referendum.

In April 2013, the Czech Ministry of Finance stated in its Convergence Programme delivered to the European Commission that the country had not yet set a target date for euro adoption and would not apply for ERM II membership in 2013. Their goal was to limit their time as an ERM II member, prior to acceding to the eurozone, to as brief a period as possible. On 29 May 2013 Miroslav Singer, the Governor of the Czech National Bank (the Czech Republic's central bank) stated that in his professional opinion the Czech Republic will not adopt the euro before 2019. In December 2013, the Czech government approved a recommendation from the Czech National Bank and Ministry of Finance against setting a formal target date for euro adoption or joining ERM II in 2014.

Miloš Zeman, who was elected President of the Czech Republic in early 2013, supports euro adoption by the Czech Republic, though he also advocates a referendum on the decision. Shortly after taking office in March 2013, Zeman suggested that the Czech Republic would not be ready for the switch for at least five years. Prime Minister Bohuslav Sobotka, from the Social Democrats, stated on 25 April 2013, prior to his party's election victory that October, that he was "convinced that the government that will be formed after next year's election should set the euro entry date" and that "1 January 2020 could be a date to look at". Shortly after being sworn into the new Cabinet in January 2014, Czech Foreign Minister Lubomír Zaorálek stated that the country should join the eurozone as soon as possible. The opposition TOP 09 had also run on a platform in the 2013 parliamentary election, that called for the Czech Republic to adopt the euro between 2018 and 2020. In line with this, the governor of the Czech National Bank, having an advisory role towards the government about the timing of euro adoption, described 2019 as the earliest possible euro entry date.

In April 2014, the Czech Ministry of Finance clarified in its Convergence Programme delivered to the European Commission, that the country had not yet set a target date for euro adoption and would not apply for ERM-II membership in 2014. Their goal was to limit their time as an ERM-II member, prior to acceding to the eurozone, to as brief a period as possible. Moreover, it was the opinion of the previous government that: "the fiscal problems of the eurozone, together with continued difficulty to predict the development of the monetary union, do not create a favorable environment for the future adoption of the euro."

Zeman stated in June 2014 that he hoped his country would adopt the euro as soon as 2017, arguing that adoption would be beneficial for the Czech economy overall. The opposition ODS party responded by running a campaign for Czechs to sign an anti-euro petition, handed over to the Czech Senate in November 2014, but viewed by political commentators as not having any impact on changing the government's policy to adopt the euro in the medium-term without holding a referendum on it.

In December 2014, the Czech government approved a joint recommendation from the Czech National Bank and Ministry of Finance, against setting a formal target date for euro adoption or joining ERM-II during the course of 2015. In March 2015, the ruling Czech Social Democratic Party adopted a policy of striving to gather political support to adopt the euro by 2020. In April 2015, the coalition government announced it had agreed to not set a euro adoption target and not to enter ERM-2 until after the next legislative election scheduled for 2017, making it unlikely that the Czech Republic will adopt the euro before 2020. In addition, the coalition government agreed that if it wins re-election it would set a deadline of 2020 to agree on a specific euro adoption roadmap. In June 2015, finance minister Andrej Babiš suggested a nonbinding public referendum on euro adoption. The Andrej Babiš' Cabinet that was formed following the 2017 legislative election never planned to proceed with euro adoption within its term.

=== 2020s ===
Petr Fiala's cabinet that emerged from the 2021 legislative election, maintained the predecessor cabinets' intention not to adopt the euro within its term, calling the adoption "disadvantageous" for the Czech Republic. The position not to set a target date for euro adoption and not to apply for ERM-II membership, was however only supported by one of the five ruling cabinet parties (ODS), while all the other four parties supported to start a euro adoption process. Czech President Petr Pavel announced in his New Year's speech for 2024, that he supported the Czech Republic to take imminent concrete steps towards adopting the euro.

In February 2024, the Czech government then appointed a commissioner for euro adoption, economist Petr Zahradnik, to oversee efforts to adopt the euro and communicate the beneficiary prospects to the Czech public. Prime Minister Petr Fiala (ODS) however immediately called a five-party coalition summit in response, as his party still disagreed with the idea to start preparing for ERM-II membership now, and hoped the government instead could negotiate and reach a new joint position on this issue - more closely aligned with the viewpoint of ODS. The Czech minister for European affairs, Martin Dvořák, at the other side proposed a timeline of joining ERM-II before the general elections in late 2025 and adopting the euro on 1 January 2030. The coalition summit resulted in a new common government policy on the issue, first cancelling the post of the recently appointed euro adoption commissioner, and then instead ordering an expert panel advice by October 2024 on the merits of joining ERM-II. The government will now await the report of the expert panel, before taking any further decisions about ERM-II membership or euro adoption.

In November 2024, Fiala announced that the decision on the eventual adoption of the euro would not be taken before the end of his government, hence postponing the decision after the October 2025 parliamentary election. This election was won by Andrej Babiš, who again confirmed that his government would not be adopting the euro in the near term. Following on its pledge, the Babiš government decided in May 2026 to end the production of an annual report assessing the country’s readiness to join the eurozone. In July 2026, Aleš Michl (the governor of the Czech National Bank) stated his opposition to Czechia adopting the euro in the near term, pleading for more economic convergence with Eurozone countries before considering joining the euro area.

== Euro use ==
Selected chain stores in the Czech Republic accept payments in euros, and return change in Czech koruna.

Starting 1 January 2024, companies are legally allowed to keep their accounts and pay taxes using Euros if they choose to do so.

== Opinion polls ==
The following are polls on the question of whether the Czech Republic should abolish the koruna and adopt the euro.

Support for adopting the euro in the Czech Republic by polling organization

Date (survey taken)	Date (when published)	Yes	No	Undecided	Conducted by
September 2004	October 2004	39%	55%	7%	Eurobarometer
September 2005	November 2005	33%	58%	9%	Eurobarometer
December 2005	January 2011	44%	56%	0%	STEM
April 2006	June 2006	56%	35%	9%	Eurobarometer
June 2006	January 2011	46%	54%	0%	STEM
September 2006	November 2006	44%	47%	9%	Eurobarometer
November 2006	January 2011	47%	53%	0%	STEM
March 2007	May 2007	46%	46%	8%	Eurobarometer
September 2007	November 2007	42%	48%	10%	Eurobarometer
May 2008	July 2008	42%	48%	10%	Eurobarometer
May 2009	December 2009	50%	44%	6%	Eurobarometer
September 2009	November 2009	37%	54%	9%	Eurobarometer
May 2010	July 2010	39%	58%	3%	Eurobarometer
September 2010	January 2011	30%	70%	0%	STEM
September 2010	December 2010	36%	61%	2%	Eurobarometer
January 2011	2011	22%	78%	0%	STEM
May 2011	August 2011	26%	69%	5%	Eurobarometer
November 2011	July 2012	13%	82%	5%	Eurobarometer
April 2012	July 2012	13%	81%	6%	Eurobarometer
April 2013	June 2013	14%	80%	6%	Eurobarometer
April 2014	June 2014	16%	77%	7%	Eurobarometer
April 2015	May 2015	24%	69%	7%	CVVM
April 2015	May 2015	29%	70%	1%	Eurobarometer
April 2016	May 2016	17%	78%	5%	CVVM
April 2016	May 2016	29%	70%	1%	Eurobarometer
April 2017	May 2017	21%	72%	7%	CVVM
April 2017	May 2017	29%	70%	1%	Eurobarometer
April 2018	May 2018	20%	73%	7%	CVVM
April 2018	May 2018	33%	66%	1%	Eurobarometer
April 2019	May 2019	20%	75%	5%	CVVM
April 2019	June 2019	39%	60%	1%	Eurobarometer
June 2020	July 2020	34%	63%	3%	Eurobarometer
May 2021	July 2021	33%	67%	0%	Eurobarometer
April 2022	June 2022	44%	55%	2%	Eurobarometer
April 2023	June 2023	45%	55%	1%	Eurobarometer
May 2023	July 2023	22%	73%	5%	CVVM
May 2024	June 2024	49%	50%	1%	Eurobarometer
February 2025	February 2025	23%	72%	4%	NMS Market Research
March 2025	June 2025	46%	54%	0%	Eurobarometer
April 2026	June 2026	42%	58%	0%	Eurobarometer

== Adoption status ==
The 1992 Maastricht Treaty originally required that all members of the European Union join the euro once certain economic criteria are met. The Czech Republic meets two of the five conditions for joining the euro as of June 2022; their inflation rate, not being a member of the European exchange rate mechanism, and the incompatibility of its domestic legislation are the conditions not met.

Convergence criteria
Assessment date	Country	HICP inflation rate (Note: The rate of change of the 12-month average HICP over the prior 12-month average must be no more than 1.5% larger than the unweighted arithmetic average of the similar HICP inflation rates in the 3 EU member states with the lowest HICP inflation. If any of these 3 states have a HICP rate significantly below the similarly averaged HICP rate for the eurozone (which according to ECB practice means more than 2% below), and if this low HICP rate has been primarily caused by exceptional circumstances (i.e. severe wage cuts or a strong recession), then such a state is not included in the calculation of the reference value and is replaced by the EU state with the fourth lowest HICP rate.)	Excessive deficit procedure		Exchange rate		Long-term interest rate (Note: The arithmetic average of the annual yield of 10-year government bonds as of the end of the past 12 months must be no more than 2.0% larger than the unweighted arithmetic average of the bond yields in the 3 EU member states with the lowest HICP inflation. If any of these states have bond yields which are significantly larger than the similarly averaged yield for the eurozone (which according to previous ECB reports means more than 2% above) and at the same time does not have complete funding access to financial markets (which is the case for as long as a government receives bailout funds), then such a state is not to be included in the calculation of the reference value.)	Compatibility of legislation
Assessment date	Country	HICP inflation rate	Budget deficit to GDP	Debt-to-GDP ratio	ERM II member	Change in rate (Note: The change in the annual average exchange rate against the euro.)	Long-term interest rate	Compatibility of legislation
2012 ECB Report (Note: Reference values from the ECB convergence report of May 2012.)	Reference values	Max. 3.1% (Note: Sweden, Ireland and Slovenia were the reference states.) (as of 31 Mar 2012)	None open (as of 31 Mar 2012)		Min. 2 years (as of 31 Mar 2012)	Max. ±15% (Note: The maximum allowed change in rate is ± 2.25% for Denmark.) (for 2011)	Max. 5.80% (Note: Sweden and Slovenia were the reference states, with Ireland excluded as an outlier.) (as of 31 Mar 2012)	Compliant (as of 31 Mar 2012)
2012 ECB Report	Reference values	Max. 3.1% (as of 31 Mar 2012)	Max. 3.0% (FY 2011)	Max. 60% (FY 2011)	Min. 2 years (as of 31 Mar 2012)	Max. ±15% (for 2011)	Max. 5.80% (as of 31 Mar 2012)	Compliant (as of 31 Mar 2012)
2012 ECB Report	Czech Republic	2.7%	Open		No	2.7%	3.54%	No
2012 ECB Report	Czech Republic	2.7%	3.1%	41.2%	No	2.7%	3.54%	No
2013 ECB Report (Note: Reference values from the ECB convergence report of June 2013.)	Reference values	Max. 2.7% (Note: Sweden, Latvia and Ireland were the reference states.) (as of 30 Apr 2013)	None open (as of 30 Apr 2013)		Min. 2 years (as of 30 Apr 2013)	Max. ±15% (for 2012)	Max. 5.5% (as of 30 Apr 2013)	Compliant (as of 30 Apr 2013)
2013 ECB Report	Reference values	Max. 2.7% (as of 30 Apr 2013)	Max. 3.0% (FY 2012)	Max. 60% (FY 2012)	Min. 2 years (as of 30 Apr 2013)	Max. ±15% (for 2012)	Max. 5.5% (as of 30 Apr 2013)	Compliant (as of 30 Apr 2013)
2013 ECB Report	Czech Republic	2.8%	Open		No	-2.3%	2.30%	Not assessed
2013 ECB Report	Czech Republic	2.8%	4.4%	45.8%	No	-2.3%	2.30%	Not assessed
2014 ECB Report (Note: Reference values from the ECB convergence report of June 2014.)	Reference values	Max. 1.7% (Note: Latvia, Portugal and Ireland were the reference states, with Greece, Bulgaria and Cyprus excluded as outliers.) (as of 30 Apr 2014)	None open (as of 30 Apr 2014)		Min. 2 years (as of 30 Apr 2014)	Max. ±15% (for 2013)	Max. 6.2% (Note: Latvia, Ireland and Portugal were the reference states.) (as of 30 Apr 2014)	Compliant (as of 30 Apr 2014)
2014 ECB Report	Reference values	Max. 1.7% (as of 30 Apr 2014)	Max. 3.0% (FY 2013)	Max. 60% (FY 2013)	Min. 2 years (as of 30 Apr 2014)	Max. ±15% (for 2013)	Max. 6.2% (as of 30 Apr 2014)	Compliant (as of 30 Apr 2014)
2014 ECB Report	Czech Republic	0.9%	Open (Closed in June 2014)		No	-3.3%	2.21%	No
2014 ECB Report	Czech Republic	0.9%	1.5%	46.0%	No	-3.3%	2.21%	No
2016 ECB Report (Note: Reference values from the ECB convergence report of June 2016.)	Reference values	Max. 0.7% (Note: Bulgaria, Slovenia and Spain were the reference states, with Cyprus and Romania excluded as outliers.) (as of 30 Apr 2016)	None open (as of 18 May 2016)		Min. 2 years (as of 18 May 2016)	Max. ±15% (for 2015)	Max. 4.0% (Note: Slovenia, Spain and Bulgaria were the reference states.) (as of 30 Apr 2016)	Compliant (as of 18 May 2016)
2016 ECB Report	Reference values	Max. 0.7% (as of 30 Apr 2016)	Max. 3.0% (FY 2015)	Max. 60% (FY 2015)	Min. 2 years (as of 18 May 2016)	Max. ±15% (for 2015)	Max. 4.0% (as of 30 Apr 2016)	Compliant (as of 18 May 2016)
2016 ECB Report	Czech Republic	0.4%	None		No	0.9%	0.6%	No
2016 ECB Report	Czech Republic	0.4%	0.4%	41.1%	No	0.9%	0.6%	No
2018 ECB Report (Note: Reference values from the ECB convergence report of May 2018.)	Reference values	Max. 1.9% (Note: Cyprus, Ireland and Finland were the reference states.) (as of 31 Mar 2018)	None open (as of 3 May 2018)		Min. 2 years (as of 3 May 2018)	Max. ±15% (for 2017)	Max. 3.2% (Note: Cyprus, Ireland and Finland were the reference states.) (as of 31 Mar 2018)	Compliant (as of 20 March 2018)
2018 ECB Report	Reference values	Max. 1.9% (as of 31 Mar 2018)	Max. 3.0% (FY 2017)	Max. 60% (FY 2017)	Min. 2 years (as of 3 May 2018)	Max. ±15% (for 2017)	Max. 3.2% (as of 31 Mar 2018)	Compliant (as of 20 March 2018)
2018 ECB Report	Czech Republic	2.2%	None		No	2.6%	1.3%	No
2018 ECB Report	Czech Republic	2.2%	-1.6% (surplus)	34.6%	No	2.6%	1.3%	No
2020 ECB Report (Note: Reference values from the ECB convergence report of June 2020.)	Reference values	Max. 1.8% (Note: Portugal, Cyprus, and Italy were the reference states.) (as of 31 Mar 2020)	None open (as of 7 May 2020)		Min. 2 years (as of 7 May 2020)	Max. ±15% (for 2019)	Max. 2.9% (Note: Portugal, Cyprus, and Italy were the reference states.) (as of 31 Mar 2020)	Compliant (as of 24 March 2020)
2020 ECB Report	Reference values	Max. 1.8% (as of 31 Mar 2020)	Max. 3.0% (FY 2019)	Max. 60% (FY 2019)	Min. 2 years (as of 7 May 2020)	Max. ±15% (for 2019)	Max. 2.9% (as of 31 Mar 2020)	Compliant (as of 24 March 2020)
2020 ECB Report	Czech Republic	2.9%	None		No	-0.1%	1.5%	No
2020 ECB Report	Czech Republic	2.9%	-0.3% (surplus)	30.8%	No	-0.1%	1.5%	No
2022 ECB Report (Note: Reference values from the Convergence Report of June 2022.)	Reference values	Max. 4.9% (Note: France, Finland, and Greece were the reference states.) (as of April 2022)	None open (as of 25 May 2022)		Min. 2 years (as of 25 May 2022)	Max. ±15% (for 2021)	Max. 2.6% (as of April 2022)	Compliant (as of 25 March 2022)
2022 ECB Report	Reference values	Max. 4.9% (as of April 2022)	Max. 3.0% (FY 2021)	Max. 60% (FY 2021)	Min. 2 years (as of 25 May 2022)	Max. ±15% (for 2021)	Max. 2.6% (as of April 2022)	Compliant (as of 25 March 2022)
2022 ECB Report	Czech Republic	6.2%	None		No	3.1%	2.5%	No
2022 ECB Report	Czech Republic	6.2%	5.9% (exempt)	41.9%	No	3.1%	2.5%	No
2024 ECB Report (Note: Reference values from the Convergence Report of June 2024.)	Reference values	Max. 3.3% (Note: Belgium, Denmark, and the Netherlands were the reference states.) (as of May 2024)	None open (as of 19 June 2024)		Min. 2 years (as of 19 June 2024)	Max. ±15% (for 2023)	Max. 4.8% (as of May 2024)	Compliant (as of 27 March 2024)
2024 ECB Report	Reference values	Max. 3.3% (as of May 2024)	Max. 3.0% (FY 2023)	Max. 60% (FY 2023)	Min. 2 years (as of 19 June 2024)	Max. ±15% (for 2023)	Max. 4.8% (as of May 2024)	Compliant (as of 27 March 2024)
2024 ECB Report	Czech Republic	6.3%	None		No	2.3%	4.2%	No
2024 ECB Report	Czech Republic	6.3%	3.7% (exempt)	44.0%	No	2.3%	4.2%	No
2025 ECB Report (Note: Reference values from the Convergence Report of June 2025.)	Reference values	Max. 2.8% (Note: Finland, Ireland, and Italy were the reference states.) (as of April 2025)	None open (as of 19 May 2025)		Min. 2 years (as of 19 May 2025)	Max. ±15% (for 2024)	Max. 5.1% (as of April 2025)	Compliant (as of 15 April 2025)
2025 ECB Report	Reference values	Max. 2.8% (as of April 2025)	Max. 3.0% (FY 2024)	Max. 60% (FY 2024)	Min. 2 years (as of 19 May 2025)	Max. ±15% (for 2024)	Max. 5.1% (as of April 2025)	Compliant (as of 15 April 2025)
2025 ECB Report	Czech Republic	2.7%	None		No	−4.6%	4.1%	Not assessed
2025 ECB Report	Czech Republic	2.7%	2.2%	43.6%	No	−4.6%	4.1%	Not assessed
2026 ECB Report (Note: Reference values from the Convergence Report of June 2026.)	Reference values	Max. 2.7% (Note: Cyprus, Denmark, and France were the reference states.) (as of May 2026)	None open (as of 17 June 2026)		Min. 2 years (as of 17 June 2026)	Max. ±15% (for 2025)	Max. 5.1% (as of May 2026)	Compliant (as of 25 March 2026)
2026 ECB Report	Reference values	Max. 2.7% (as of May 2026)	Max. 3.0% (FY 2025)	Max. 60% (FY 2025)	Min. 2 years (as of 17 June 2026)	Max. ±15% (for 2025)	Max. 5.1% (as of May 2026)	Compliant (as of 25 March 2026)
2026 ECB Report	Czech Republic	1.9%	None		No	1.7%	4.5%	No
2026 ECB Report	Czech Republic	1.9%	2.1%	44.3%	No	1.7%	4.5%	No

Criterion fulfilled
Criterion potentially fulfilled: If the budget deficit exceeds the 3% limit, but is "close" to this value (the European Commission has deemed 3.5% to be close by in the past), then the criteria can still potentially be fulfilled if either the deficits in the previous two years are significantly declining towards the 3% limit, or if the excessive deficit is the result of exceptional circumstances which are temporary in nature (i.e. one-off expenditures triggered by a significant economic downturn, or by the implementation of economic reforms that are expected to deliver a significant positive impact on the government's future fiscal budgets). However, even if such "special circumstances" are found to exist, additional criteria must also be met to comply with the fiscal budget criterion. Additionally, if the debt-to-GDP ratio exceeds 60% but is "sufficiently diminishing and approaching the reference value at a satisfactory pace" it can be deemed to be in compliance.
Criterion not fulfilled

== See also ==
- Enlargement of the eurozone
- Czech Republic in the European Union
