= Hungary and the euro =

Plans since 2003 to replace the Hungarian forint with the euro

Eurozone participation European Union member states (special territories not shown) 21 in the eurozone 1 in ERM II, with an opt-out (Denmark) 5 not in ERM II, but committed to join the eurozone after meeting the convergence criteria (Czech Republic, Hungary, Poland, Romania, and Sweden) Non–EU member states 4 using the euro with a monetary agreement (Andorra, Monaco, San Marino, and Vatican City) 2 using the euro unilaterally (Kosovo and Montenegro)

While the Hungarian government has been planning since 2003 to replace the Hungarian forint with the euro, the government has not set a target date and the forint is not part of the European Exchange Rate Mechanism (ERM II). In 2023, György Matolcsy, governor of the Hungarian National Bank and former Minister of the National Economy stated that adoption of the Euro by Hungary could take place "perhaps around 2030 or a bit later", calling it "club of the rich" and saying that at that time, in Hungary, "the economy is unprepared for it". The forint is enshrined in the Hungarian constitution (Article K), which can be amended with a two-thirds parliamentary majority.

== Adopting the euro ==
=== Under the MSZP governments between 2002 and 2010 ===
Hungary originally planned to adopt the euro as its official currency in 2007 or 2008. Later 1 January 2010 became the target date, but that date was abandoned because of an excessively high budget deficit, inflation, and public debt. For years, Hungary could not meet any of the Maastricht criteria. After the 2006 election, Prime Minister Ferenc Gyurcsány introduced austerity measures, causing protests in late 2006 and an economic slowdown in 2007 and 2008. However, in 2007, the deficit had been reduced to less than 5% (from 9.2%) and approached the 3% threshold in 2008. In 2008 analysts claimed that Hungary could join ERM II in 2010 or 2011 and so might adopt the euro in 2013, but more feasibly in 2014, or later, depending on European debt crisis developments. On 8 July 2008, the then Finance Minister János Veres announced the first draft of a euro adoption plan.

An economic study published in October 2007 found that the adoption of the euro would increase foreign investment in Hungary by 30%.

After the 2008 financial crisis, the likelihood of a fast adoption seemed greater. Hungary received aid from the International Monetary Fund (IMF), the European Union and the World Bank. In October 2008 the head of Hungary's largest bank called for a special application to join the eurozone.

Ferenc Gyurcsány ran out of political capital in March 2009 to accept necessary measures. The exchange rate reached 317 forints to one euro on 6 March. Gyurcsány initiated a constructive motion of no confidence against himself on 21 March and nominated Minister for Development and economist Gordon Bajnai as his replacement. The socialist and liberal parties accepted him as the new prime minister, with an interim government for one year from 14 April. Bajnai's premiership brought new austerity measures in Hungary. Thus, they may keep the deficit under 4% in 2009 and the 2010 Budget calculations assumed 3.8%. The inflation outturn was near 3% as a result of the crisis, but because of the increase in VAT, it averaged 5% in the second half of the year. Because of the IMF loan, the public debt rose to nearly 80%. The central bank interest rate fell to 6.25% from 10.5% in 2009. The Bajnai government could not lead Hungary into the ERM II, and it stated that it had no plans to do so.

=== Under the Fidesz government between 2010 and 2026 ===
Fidesz won enough seats in the 2010 Hungarian parliamentary election to form a government on its own. Fidesz was not specific then about its economic priorities. Shortly after the formation of the new government, they announced their intention to keep the 2010 deficit at 3.8%. After more pressure, in September they also accepted a reduction to 3% in 2011. In 2010, Finance Minister György Matolcsy said they would discuss euro adoption in 2012. Mihály Varga, another member of the party, talked about possible euro adoption in 2014 or 2015.

However, in February 2011, Prime Minister Viktor Orbán made clear that he does not expect the euro to be adopted in Hungary before 2020. Later, Matolcsy also confirmed this statement. Orbán said the country was not yet ready to adopt the currency and they would not discuss the possibility until the public debt reached a 50% threshold. The public debt-to-GDP ratio was 81.0% when Orbán's 50% target was set in 2011, and it was forecast to decline to 73.5% in 2016, though this was not reached.

In 2011, experts said that the earliest date that Hungary could adopt the euro was 2015.

When the countries of the eurozone adopted the Euro-Plus Pact on 25 March 2011, Hungary decided to go along with the United Kingdom, Sweden and the Czech Republic and chose not to join the pact. Matolcsy said that they could agree with the most of its contents, but did not want to give up the country's independence regarding corporate tax matters. As the Euro-Plus Pact does not feature any legal obligations - but only commitments to use various sets of voluntary tools to improve employment, competitiveness, fiscal responsibility and financial stability - joining this pact would not lead to a requirement for Hungary to abandon their current corporate tax method.

In April 2013, Viktor Orbán proclaimed euro adoption would not happen until the Hungarian purchasing power parity weighted GDP per capita had reached 90% of the eurozone average. According to Eurostat, this relative percentage rose from 57.0% in 2004 to 63.4% in 2014. If the same pace of "catching up" progress was to be expected in the future as in the past ten years (6.4% per decade), Hungary would only reach Orbán's 90% target and adopt the euro in 2056. Although, Hungary could potentially also reach Orbán's 90% target and adopt the euro in 2033, if being able for the upcoming period to sustain the same 1.4% of annual improvements in the figure as achieved from 2013 to 2014. Shortly after Orbán had been re-elected as Prime Minister for another four-year term in April 2014, the Hungarian Central Bank announced that they planned to introduce a new series of forint banknotes in 2018. In June 2015, Orbán declared that his government would no longer entertain the idea of replacing the forint with the euro in 2020, as was previously suggested, and instead expected the forint to remain "stable and strong for the next several decades", although, in July 2016, National Economy Minister Mihály Varga suggested that country could adopt the euro by the "end of the decade", but only if economic trends continue to improve and the common currency becomes more stable. No official target date has been set for euro adoption.

In July 2025, Péter Csányi, the CEO of OTP Bank (Hungary's largest lender), called for the adoption of the euro, describing it as "very desirable" and a "predictable economic and regulatory environment" as important, in contrast to destabilising policy under Orbán. In November 2025, Péter Magyar (Orban's main challenger in the 2026 Hungarian parliamentary election) stated that if he was to win the election and form a government, he would seek to bring Hungary into the Eurozone.

=== Under the Tisza government from 2026 ===
Following a victory in the 2026 election, Péter Magyar stated that Euro adoption was in the nation's interest, and although unable to give a specific target date, noted that his government will set an entry timeline after a review of the economy. Simultaneously, Magyar gave a possible euro adoption target of 2030 or 2031. According to Sili Tian from the Economist Intelligence Unit, this goal is overly ambitious due to the state of the Hungarian economy. On the other hand Julia Kiraly, former deputy governor of the Hungarian National Bank, sees this goal as realistic.

== Public opinion ==
Public support for the euro in Hungary

The following are polls on the question of whether Hungary should abolish the forint and adopt the euro.

Date (survey taken)	Date (survey published)	Yes	No	Undecided / Don't know	Conducted by
May 2026	June 2026	80%	17%	3%	Eurobarometer
March 2025	June 2025	75%	22%	3%	Eurobarometer
May 2024	June 2024	76%	20%	4%	Eurobarometer
April 2023	June 2023	72%	25%	3%	Eurobarometer
April 2022	June 2022	70%	29%	1%	Eurobarometer
May 2021	July 2021	69%	26%	5%	Eurobarometer
June 2020	July 2020	66%	31%	3%	Eurobarometer
April 2019	June 2019	66%	28%	6%	Eurobarometer
April 2018	May 2018	59%	32%	9%	Eurobarometer
April 2017	May 2017	57%	39%	4%	Eurobarometer
April 2016	May 2016	57%	37%	6%	Eurobarometer
April 2015	May 2015	60%	35%	5%	Eurobarometer
April 2014	June 2014	64%	30%	6%	Eurobarometer
April 2013	June 2013	54%	39%	7%	Eurobarometer
April 2012	July 2012	58%	34%	8%	Eurobarometer
November 2011	July 2012	54%	36%	10%	Eurobarometer
May 2011	August 2011	47%	42%	11%	Eurobarometer
September 2010	December 2010	47%	41%	12%	Eurobarometer
May 2010	July 2010	54%	36%	10%	Eurobarometer
September 2009	November 2009	54%	38%	8%	Eurobarometer
May 2009	December 2009	58%	34%	8%	Eurobarometer
May 2008	July 2008	47%	43%	10%	Eurobarometer
September 2007	November 2007	48%	38%	14%	Eurobarometer
March 2007	May 2007	49%	37%	14%	Eurobarometer
September 2006	November 2006	46%	45%	9%	Eurobarometer
April 2006	June 2006	56%	35%	9%	Eurobarometer
September 2005	November 2005	49%	37%	14%	Eurobarometer
September 2004	October 2004	56%	33%	11%	Eurobarometer

== The Maastricht criteria ==
=== Inflation ===
Inflation slowed down to 2.2% in 2006. However, after the austerity measures it was much higher than the criteria until the crisis. The crisis slowed it down to 2.9%, but in the end it was above the Maastricht criteria in 2009. The annual inflation was 0.9% in October 2013 and 3.3% in December 2025.

=== Budget deficit ===
The budget deficit was 9.2% in the election year of 2006. After the austerity measures, it neared the 3% threshold in 2008. The deficit was planned to be 3.9% in 2009, but was ultimately above 4%. The 2010 budget planned 3.8%, but it also went over 4%. Hungary's general government deficit, excluding the effect of one-off measures, was 2.43% of GDP in 2011, lower than the 2.94% target and under the 3% threshold for the first time since 2004. Hungary recorded a budget deficit of 1.9% in 2012, well below previous expectations. The budget deficit was expected to be under the 3% threshold in 2013 as well, however, it was 4.7% in the 4th quarter of 2025.

=== Public debt ===
Public debt accounted for 80.1% of GDP in 2010 and 74.6% in the 4th quarter of in 2025, above the 60% target. However, the EU might accept a Hungarian public debt which declines for at least 2 years.

=== Interest rate ===
The central bank's interest rate was raised by 3% to 11.5% in October 2008, because of the crisis. However, then it was lowered consecutively 14 times until 27 April 2010 down to 5.25%. Then it was raised 5 times until 21 December 2011 up to 7%. Since then the rate has declined 35 times, as of February 2019 the interest rate is 0.90%

=== ERM-II membership ===
As the conservative government in 2013 did not plan to adopt the euro before 2020, there is no discussion about a possible ERM II membership.

=== Convergence status ===
Convergence criteria
Assessment date	Country	HICP inflation rate (Note: The rate of change of the 12-month average HICP over the prior 12-month average must be no more than 1.5% larger than the unweighted arithmetic average of the similar HICP inflation rates in the 3 EU member states with the lowest HICP inflation. If any of these 3 states have a HICP rate significantly below the similarly averaged HICP rate for the eurozone (which according to ECB practice means more than 2% below), and if this low HICP rate has been primarily caused by exceptional circumstances (i.e. severe wage cuts or a strong recession), then such a state is not included in the calculation of the reference value and is replaced by the EU state with the fourth lowest HICP rate.)	Excessive deficit procedure		Exchange rate		Long-term interest rate (Note: The arithmetic average of the annual yield of 10-year government bonds as of the end of the past 12 months must be no more than 2.0% larger than the unweighted arithmetic average of the bond yields in the 3 EU member states with the lowest HICP inflation. If any of these states have bond yields which are significantly larger than the similarly averaged yield for the eurozone (which according to previous ECB reports means more than 2% above) and at the same time does not have complete funding access to financial markets (which is the case for as long as a government receives bailout funds), then such a state is not to be included in the calculation of the reference value.)	Compatibility of legislation
Assessment date	Country	HICP inflation rate	Budget deficit to GDP	Debt-to-GDP ratio	ERM II member	Change in rate (Note: The change in the annual average exchange rate against the euro.)	Long-term interest rate	Compatibility of legislation
2012 ECB Report (Note: Reference values from the ECB convergence report of May 2012.)	Reference values	Max. 3.1% (Note: Sweden, Ireland and Slovenia were the reference states.) (as of 31 Mar 2012)	None open (as of 31 Mar 2012)		Min. 2 years (as of 31 Mar 2012)	Max. ±15% (Note: The maximum allowed change in rate is ± 2.25% for Denmark.) (for 2011)	Max. 5.80% (Note: Sweden and Slovenia were the reference states, with Ireland excluded as an outlier.) (as of 31 Mar 2012)	Compliant (as of 31 Mar 2012)
2012 ECB Report	Reference values	Max. 3.1% (as of 31 Mar 2012)	Max. 3.0% (FY 2011)	Max. 60% (FY 2011)	Min. 2 years (as of 31 Mar 2012)	Max. ±15% (for 2011)	Max. 5.80% (as of 31 Mar 2012)	Compliant (as of 31 Mar 2012)
2012 ECB Report	Hungary	4.3%	Open		No	-1.4%	8.01%	No
2012 ECB Report	Hungary	4.3%	-4.3% (surplus)	80.6%	No	-1.4%	8.01%	No
2013 ECB Report (Note: Reference values from the ECB convergence report of June 2013.)	Reference values	Max. 2.7% (Note: Sweden, Latvia and Ireland were the reference states.) (as of 30 Apr 2013)	None open (as of 30 Apr 2013)		Min. 2 years (as of 30 Apr 2013)	Max. ±15% (for 2012)	Max. 5.5% (as of 30 Apr 2013)	Compliant (as of 30 Apr 2013)
2013 ECB Report	Reference values	Max. 2.7% (as of 30 Apr 2013)	Max. 3.0% (FY 2012)	Max. 60% (FY 2012)	Min. 2 years (as of 30 Apr 2013)	Max. ±15% (for 2012)	Max. 5.5% (as of 30 Apr 2013)	Compliant (as of 30 Apr 2013)
2013 ECB Report	Hungary	4.6%	Open (Closed in June 2013)		No	-3.5%	6.97%	Not assessed
2013 ECB Report	Hungary	4.6%	1.9%	79.2%	No	-3.5%	6.97%	Not assessed
2014 ECB Report (Note: Reference values from the ECB convergence report of June 2014.)	Reference values	Max. 1.7% (Note: Latvia, Portugal and Ireland were the reference states, with Greece, Bulgaria and Cyprus excluded as outliers.) (as of 30 Apr 2014)	None open (as of 30 Apr 2014)		Min. 2 years (as of 30 Apr 2014)	Max. ±15% (for 2013)	Max. 6.2% (Note: Latvia, Ireland and Portugal were the reference states.) (as of 30 Apr 2014)	Compliant (as of 30 Apr 2014)
2014 ECB Report	Reference values	Max. 1.7% (as of 30 Apr 2014)	Max. 3.0% (FY 2013)	Max. 60% (FY 2013)	Min. 2 years (as of 30 Apr 2014)	Max. ±15% (for 2013)	Max. 6.2% (as of 30 Apr 2014)	Compliant (as of 30 Apr 2014)
2014 ECB Report	Hungary	1.0%	None		No	-2.6%	5.80%	No
2014 ECB Report	Hungary	1.0%	2.2%	79.2%	No	-2.6%	5.80%	No
2016 ECB Report (Note: Reference values from the ECB convergence report of June 2016.)	Reference values	Max. 0.7% (Note: Bulgaria, Slovenia and Spain were the reference states, with Cyprus and Romania excluded as outliers.) (as of 30 Apr 2016)	None open (as of 18 May 2016)		Min. 2 years (as of 18 May 2016)	Max. ±15% (for 2015)	Max. 4.0% (Note: Slovenia, Spain and Bulgaria were the reference states.) (as of 30 Apr 2016)	Compliant (as of 18 May 2016)
2016 ECB Report	Reference values	Max. 0.7% (as of 30 Apr 2016)	Max. 3.0% (FY 2015)	Max. 60% (FY 2015)	Min. 2 years (as of 18 May 2016)	Max. ±15% (for 2015)	Max. 4.0% (as of 30 Apr 2016)	Compliant (as of 18 May 2016)
2016 ECB Report	Hungary	0.4%	None		No	-0.4%	3.4%	No
2016 ECB Report	Hungary	0.4%	2.0%	75.3%	No	-0.4%	3.4%	No
2018 ECB Report (Note: Reference values from the ECB convergence report of May 2018.)	Reference values	Max. 1.9% (Note: Cyprus, Ireland and Finland were the reference states.) (as of 31 Mar 2018)	None open (as of 3 May 2018)		Min. 2 years (as of 3 May 2018)	Max. ±15% (for 2017)	Max. 3.2% (Note: Cyprus, Ireland and Finland were the reference states.) (as of 31 Mar 2018)	Compliant (as of 20 March 2018)
2018 ECB Report	Reference values	Max. 1.9% (as of 31 Mar 2018)	Max. 3.0% (FY 2017)	Max. 60% (FY 2017)	Min. 2 years (as of 3 May 2018)	Max. ±15% (for 2017)	Max. 3.2% (as of 31 Mar 2018)	Compliant (as of 20 March 2018)
2018 ECB Report	Hungary	2.2%	None		No	0.7%	2.7%	No
2018 ECB Report	Hungary	2.2%	2.0%	73.6%	No	0.7%	2.7%	No
2020 ECB Report (Note: Reference values from the ECB convergence report of June 2020.)	Reference values	Max. 1.8% (Note: Portugal, Cyprus, and Italy were the reference states.) (as of 31 Mar 2020)	None open (as of 7 May 2020)		Min. 2 years (as of 7 May 2020)	Max. ±15% (for 2019)	Max. 2.9% (Note: Portugal, Cyprus, and Italy were the reference states.) (as of 31 Mar 2020)	Compliant (as of 24 March 2020)
2020 ECB Report	Reference values	Max. 1.8% (as of 31 Mar 2020)	Max. 3.0% (FY 2019)	Max. 60% (FY 2019)	Min. 2 years (as of 7 May 2020)	Max. ±15% (for 2019)	Max. 2.9% (as of 31 Mar 2020)	Compliant (as of 24 March 2020)
2020 ECB Report	Hungary	3.7%	None		No	-2.0%	2.3%	No
2020 ECB Report	Hungary	3.7%	2.0%	66.3%	No	-2.0%	2.3%	No
2022 ECB Report (Note: Reference values from the Convergence Report of June 2022.)	Reference values	Max. 4.9% (Note: France, Finland, and Greece were the reference states.) (as of April 2022)	None open (as of 25 May 2022)		Min. 2 years (as of 25 May 2022)	Max. ±15% (for 2021)	Max. 2.6% (as of April 2022)	Compliant (as of 25 March 2022)
2022 ECB Report	Reference values	Max. 4.9% (as of April 2022)	Max. 3.0% (FY 2021)	Max. 60% (FY 2021)	Min. 2 years (as of 25 May 2022)	Max. ±15% (for 2021)	Max. 2.6% (as of April 2022)	Compliant (as of 25 March 2022)
2022 ECB Report	Hungary	6.8%	None		No	-2.1%	4.1%	No
2022 ECB Report	Hungary	6.8%	6.8% (exempt)	76.8% (exempt)	No	-2.1%	4.1%	No
2024 ECB Report (Note: Reference values from the Convergence Report of June 2024.)	Reference values	Max. 3.3% (Note: Belgium, Denmark, and the Netherlands were the reference states.) (as of May 2024)	None open (as of 19 June 2024)		Min. 2 years (as of 19 June 2024)	Max. ±15% (for 2023)	Max. 4.8% (as of May 2024)	Compliant (as of 27 March 2024)
2024 ECB Report	Reference values	Max. 3.3% (as of May 2024)	Max. 3.0% (FY 2023)	Max. 60% (FY 2023)	Min. 2 years (as of 19 June 2024)	Max. ±15% (for 2023)	Max. 4.8% (as of May 2024)	Compliant (as of 27 March 2024)
2024 ECB Report	Hungary	8.4%	None		No	2.4%	6.8%	No
2024 ECB Report	Hungary	8.4%	6.7%	73.5%	No	2.4%	6.8%	No
2025 ECB Report (Note: Reference values from the Convergence Report of June 2025.)	Reference values	Max. 2.8% (Note: Finland, Ireland, and Italy were the reference states.) (as of April 2025)	None open (as of 19 May 2025)		Min. 2 years (as of 19 May 2025)	Max. ±15% (for 2024)	Max. 5.1% (as of April 2025)	Compliant (as of 15 April 2025)
2025 ECB Report	Reference values	Max. 2.8% (as of April 2025)	Max. 3.0% (FY 2024)	Max. 60% (FY 2024)	Min. 2 years (as of 19 May 2025)	Max. ±15% (for 2024)	Max. 5.1% (as of April 2025)	Compliant (as of 15 April 2025)
2025 ECB Report	Hungary	4.2%	Open		No	−3.5%	7.0%	Not assessed
2025 ECB Report	Hungary	4.2%	4.9%	73.5%	No	−3.5%	7.0%	Not assessed
2026 ECB Report (Note: Reference values from the Convergence Report of June 2026.)	Reference values	Max. 2.7% (Note: Cyprus, Denmark, and France were the reference states.) (as of May 2026)	None open (as of 17 June 2026)		Min. 2 years (as of 17 June 2026)	Max. ±15% (for 2025)	Max. 5.1% (as of May 2026)	Compliant (as of 25 March 2026)
2026 ECB Report	Reference values	Max. 2.7% (as of May 2026)	Max. 3.0% (FY 2025)	Max. 60% (FY 2025)	Min. 2 years (as of 17 June 2026)	Max. ±15% (for 2025)	Max. 5.1% (as of May 2026)	Compliant (as of 25 March 2026)
2026 ECB Report	Hungary	3.3%	Open		No	−0.6%	6.7%	No
2026 ECB Report	Hungary	3.3%	4.7%	74.6%	No	−0.6%	6.7%	No

Criterion fulfilled
Criterion potentially fulfilled: If the budget deficit exceeds the 3% limit, but is "close" to this value (the European Commission has deemed 3.5% to be close by in the past), then the criteria can still potentially be fulfilled if either the deficits in the previous two years are significantly declining towards the 3% limit, or if the excessive deficit is the result of exceptional circumstances which are temporary in nature (i.e. one-off expenditures triggered by a significant economic downturn, or by the implementation of economic reforms that are expected to deliver a significant positive impact on the government's future fiscal budgets). However, even if such "special circumstances" are found to exist, additional criteria must also be met to comply with the fiscal budget criterion. Additionally, if the debt-to-GDP ratio exceeds 60% but is "sufficiently diminishing and approaching the reference value at a satisfactory pace" it can be deemed to be in compliance.
Criterion not fulfilled

== See also ==
- Enlargement of the eurozone
- Hungary in the European Union
- Hungarian withdrawal from the European Union
