= Romania and the euro =

Eurozone participation European Union member states (special territories not shown) 21 in the eurozone 1 in ERM II, with an opt-out (Denmark) 5 not in ERM II, but committed to join the eurozone after meeting the convergence criteria (Czech Republic, Hungary, Poland, Romania, and Sweden) Non–EU member states 4 using the euro with a monetary agreement (Andorra, Monaco, San Marino, and Vatican City) 2 using the euro unilaterally (Kosovo and Montenegro)

Romania's national currency is the leu / RON. After Romania joined the European Union (EU) in 2007, the country became required to replace the leu with the euro once it meets all four euro convergence criteria, as stated in article 140 of the Treaty on the Functioning of the European Union. As of 2026, the only currency on the market is the leu and the euro is not yet used. The Romanian leu is not part of the European Exchange Rate Mechanism (ERM II), although Romanian authorities are working to prepare the changeover to the euro. To achieve the currency changeover, Romania must undergo at least two years of stability within the limits of the convergence criteria.

The previous Romanian government adopted a self-imposed benchmark for achieving a certain level of real convergence, using it as a guiding reference to determine the appropriate target year for ERM II membership and eventual euro adoption. In March 2023, it set the goal of joining the eurozone’s “antechamber” (ERM II) in 2026 and adopting the euro in 2029. However, these self-imposed targets are outdated and unrealistic, as Romania’s large fiscal deficit is unlikely to allow the country to join the eurozone before 2030, at the earliest.

== History ==
=== First changes in the Romanian currency ===
Romania has been an open economy with free capital flow since September 2006, and with total foreign trade exceeding 75% of Gross Domestic Product (GDP) (Isărescu 2007).

Romania's financial market is developing, and experts have noted a trend toward greater efficiency of stock exchange transactions. Consequently, inflows of portfolio investments appear likely to increase. This could become a resource to address the current account deficit. Remittances from Romanian people who work abroad are expected to maintain high levels in the short term. Nevertheless, the country's accession to the EU also gives rise to a new resource capable of covering the deficit, namely transfers from structural and cohesive funds to Romania, as a cohesion country that would be achieved starting in 2008.

The first step required to prepare for the changeover of the leu to the euro took place at the same time as depreciation of the national currency. In 2005 the new Romanian leu was printed with the same physical dimensions as the euro in order to fit the Union's automatic teller machine (ATM) system.

In 2006, the Romanian government announced that the new plan to join the ERM II (a prerequisite for euro adoption) would take place only after 2012 because of significant impediments such as price instability and high interest rates. The president of the European Central Bank said in June 2007 that "Romania has a lot of homework to do ... over a number of years" before joining ERM II. The Romanian government announced in December 2009 their official plan to join the Eurozone by 1 January 2015.

In 2011, the Romanian government announced it would work to comply with the first four convergence criteria by 2013, but the economy would need further reforms to successfully change to the euro.

=== The delays in adhering to the ERM II ===
In 2012, the governor of the National Bank of Romania (BNR) confirmed that Romania would not meet its target to join the Eurozone in 2015. He addressed the benefits for Romania to not being a part of the euro area during the European debt crisis, but said that the country would strive to comply with all convergence criteria. Concerns about Romania's workforce productivity were also cited for the delay.

In 2013, Romania submitted their annual Convergence Program to the European Commission, which did not specify a target date for euro adoption. Prime Minister Victor Ponta stated that Eurozone entry is still a fundamental objective for Romania but they cannot enter unprepared, making 2020 a more realistic entry date.

At the same time, the BNR submitted draft amendments for the Romanian Constitution to the European Central Bank (ECB) for review. The amendments would make the BNR's statute an organic law to ensure "institutional and functional stability" and would allow for "transfer of BNR tasks to the ECB and introduction of the Euro as legal tender".

In 2014, Romania's Convergence Report set the target date for the euro adoption as 1 January 2019. According to the Erste Group Bank, Romania would be unable to meet this ambitious target by 2019, not in regard to complying with the four nominal convergence criteria values, but in reaching appropriate levels of real convergence (i.e., raising the GDP per capita from 50% to a level above 60% of the EU average) ahead of euro adoption.

The Romanian Central Bank governor, Mugur Isărescu, admitted the target was challenging, but obtainable if the political parties passed a legal roadmap for implementing required reforms. This roadmap appeared able to lead Romania to entering the ERM II on 1 January 2017 so that the euro could be adopted after two years of ERM II membership on 1 January 2019.

In 2015, however, Isărescu again argued for a delay in the changeover to the euro. Ahead of ERM II entry, Romania would need to conduct monetary adjustments by finalising the process to bring minimum reserve requirement ratios in line with Eurozone levels. Isărescu predicted the process would take twelve to eighteen months; Romania needed to complete major economic policy adjustments by:

- removing the sources of repressed inflation (i.e., completion of energy market deregulation);
- removing sources of quasi-fiscal deficits (by restructuring loss-making state-owned enterprises);
- removing other sources of future budgetary pressures (i.e., unavoidable expenditures to modernise road infrastructure).

As of April 2015, the Romanian government expressed commitment to join all pillars of the Banking Union as soon as possible, and concluded it was still on track to meet its target for euro adoption in 2019, both in regards of ensuring full compliance with all nominal convergence criteria and in regards of ensuring a prior satisfying degree of "real convergence". The Romanian target for "real convergence" ahead of euro adoption, is for its GDP per capita (in purchasing power standards) to be above 60% of the same average figure for the entire European Union, and according to the latest outlook, this relative figure was now forecast to reach 65% in 2018 and 71% in 2020, after having risen at the same pace from 29% in 2002 to 54% in 2014.

In June 2015, Romania's Prime Minister Victor Ponta said that although it had not yet been debated as a concrete political proposal in the government, he was open to the idea of holding a referendum on euro adoption in 2017 or 2018, although he acknowledged this matter would be solely up for the President of Romania to decide. The President, BNR Governor and Finance Minister however did not consider or plan for this referendum idea to be developed any further.

In September 2015, Romania's central bank governor Mugur Isarescu stated that the 2019 target was no longer realistic. The Romanian foreign minister, Teodor Meleșcanu, declared on 28 August 2017 that as Romania currently "meets all formal requirements, it could join the currency union even tomorrow"; but because of a concern also to reach a prior satisfying degree of "real convergence" in order for the euro adoption not to cause negative economic harm towards pensioners and low income people, he thought Romania will only be ready to "adopt the euro in five years, in 2022".

In March 2018, the National Plan for the Adoption of the Euro proposed that the euro would be adopted in 2024, which did not materialize. In March 2018, members of the ruling Social Democratic Party (PSD) also voted at an extraordinary congress to back a 2024 target year to adopt the euro as Romania's currency.

In February 2021, the Romanian Prime Minister, Florin Cîțu, however announced that the date for Romanian ERM II membership had been delayed to 2024, and the adoption of the euro would be delayed again to 2027 or 2028. Then, in December 2021, Florin Georgescu, the first deputy governor of the National Bank of Romania (BNR), said that the date would be once again delayed to 2029.

In March 2023, the government maintained the target for euro adoption to be 2029, while the target to enter the antechamber of the eurozone (ERM-II) was set to 2026.

The Romanian Fiscal Council, represented by its president Daniel Dăianu, handed over a fiscal advice and analysis to the Romanian government in August 2023, concluding that the ongoing troubles to limit the excessive budget deficit had delayed the earliest year of ERM II membership to 2026–2027 and euro adoption to 2029–2030. The current national plan for adoption of the euro established a self-imposed criterion for Romania to reduce its structural budget deficit to 1% of GDP before entering ERM II. After reaching a historic high at 7.4% of GDP in 2020, the structural budget deficit was forecast to continue exceeding this ERM II criterion at a projected 5.7% of GDP in 2023 and 4.8% of GDP in 2024.

In February 2024, Finance Minister Marcel Boloș stated that even with the new more lenient EU fiscal rules entering into force starting from fiscal year 2025, which he expected would extend the adjustment period for Romania and move the required exit of its ongoing Excessive Deficit Procedure (EDP) from 2024 to 2027, the implementation of some significant annual budget cuts amounting to 0.5% of GDP each year would still be required. Romania was at first granted four years to correct its excessive deficit when the procedure was opened in 2020, but the Finance Minister assessed that Romania would likely now need a full maximum seven years to adjust, and admitted that "as long as we don’t enter on a clear fiscal consolidation path, euro-entry remains just a longer-term objective."

The latest mid-term fiscal plan of the Romanian government targets a budget deficit of 5.0% of GDP in 2024, and will only reduce it to below the EDP-required limit of 3% of GDP in 2027. Moody's projected a budget deficit of 5.7% of GDP in 2024, and assessed that "the European Commission will likely conclude this spring that Romania has failed to meet its fiscal targets under the Excessive Deficit Procedure, but Moody's expects that the government will not announce any additional consolidation efforts until after the parliamentary elections in the second half of 2024." In May 2024, the budget deficit was recorded to 6.6% of GDP in 2023, and projected by the Commission to reach 6.9% of GDP in 2024.

Despite having declared itself to be bound by the most strict fiscal provisions of the European Fiscal Compact, Romania, as a non-eurozone member state, will not be subject to the standard fine of 0.2% of GDP for having failed to meet its fiscal targets under the EDP (a deficit at maximum 4.4% of GDP in 2023 and 2.9% of GDP in 2024). However, the European Commission has previously warned Romania that failure to meet the fiscal targets of its EDP could result in the partial cancellation of ongoing payments (grants and loans) from its National Recovery and Resilience Plan for 2021-2026, of which €9 billion out of €28.5 billion had been paid as of March 2024.

In February 2026, Romanian president Nicușor Dan reaffirmed the goal of joining the eurozone and stated that Romania could meet the criteria for adopting the euro in the next 3 to 4 years. In July 2026, Dan announced a political agreement between the main centrist political parties to elaborate jointly with the National Bank of Romania a roadmap for joining the eurozone.

On 1 August 2026, Romanian President Nicușor Dan announced a political agreement on the continuation of Romania's accession to the eurozone. In a statement made after the country's rating was reconfirmed by Fitch Ratings, he stated that the future Government, together with the National Bank of Romania (BNR), will develop a roadmap for the coming years, setting out the necessary actions for adopting the euro. The statement was made in the context of presenting economic priorities and reaffirming political consensus on Romania's main strategic objectives, including the implementation of the National Recovery and Resilience Plan (NRRP) and continuing fiscal consolidation.

On 17 August 2026, Dragoș Pîslaru, the Minister of Investments and European Projects, explicitly said that 2032 could be an important target for Romania's entry into the eurozone.

In the late September 2026, Alexandru Nazare, the Minister of Finance announced that Romania aims to join the eurozone by 2035. To achieve this the country must exit the excessive deficit procedure by 2030.

== Current perspectives ==
There is no pressure on Romania to adhere to ERM in a certain year, followed by the adoption of the euro two years later. The EU member states can use the derogation clause to prevent Romania from entering into ERM, and hold onto their monetary policies as a buffer against external shocks. The EU Commission and the European Council have not urged Romania, a euro candidate country, to join the Eurozone and it is not likely to happen in the future, due to rising doubts in Brussels and in capitals of some current Eurozone members regarding the wisdom of further Eurozone enlargement. Therefore, Romania has enough time to establish economic conditions under which the loss of monetary and fiscal sovereignty would be less painful.

=== Monetary and exchange rate policies ===
In Romania, the main objective of the BNR is to ensure and maintain price stability while concurrently promoting the government's general economic policy. As stated in Article 2 of Law 312/2004, the national bank is responsible for defining and implementing the monetary policy strategy (Direct Inflation Targeting) and the exchange rate policy.

Over the years, the BNR has supported the monetary policy by progressively decreasing the policy rate. The first step achieved was between February 2009 and March 2012, when the BNR cut the policy rate by a cumulative 500 basis points, to 5.25%, followed by rapid decreases in the annual inflation rate, which made it possible for the BNR to resume downward adjustment of the policy rate. Between July 2013 and February 2014, the BNR cut the policy rate by a cumulative 175 basis points, to 3.5%.

Romania has managed floating exchange rates, and is in line with using inflation targets as a nominal anchor for monetary policy and to enable flexible policy responses to unpredictable shocks that would potentially affect the economy. Reasons for not entering the euro area are complex, covering national problems, including insufficient economic convergence over a lacking perceived attractiveness of euro membership, as well as an unresolved institutional reform agenda (Backé and Dvorsky 2018).

=== Preparing the changeover to the euro ===
Disclaimer of the monetary policy instrument. Responsibility for monetary policy and exchange rate would pass to the European Central Bank, leaving Romania without the ability to control an important monetary policy instrument (the monetary policy interest rate) and giving up to the exchange rate, another instrument that contributes to adjusting the economy, especially during recessions.

Convergence. In order to suffer a smaller cost from the currency changeover, the structural, real and institutional convergence must be as high as possible. Business cycles must be synchronised (periods of economic downturn and economic growth to be simultaneous in Romania and in the Eurozone). In general, Romania is a quarter-lagged room against the Eurozone economy. Hence, the effects of the ECB's monetary policy will have an asymmetrical effect. The decision to change to the euro currency is not appropriate to the phase of Romania's economic cycle.

Control of macroeconomics balances. Romania must maintain the balance of macroeconomics: in the private sector (low debt rate), in the budgetary sector (a low budget deficit) and in the external sector (a stable balance).

An alternative instrument for interest rate and exchange rate. By renouncing the two instruments, Romania needs to find a substitute tool: economists usually recommend the flexibility of the labour market, the flexibility of wages and mobility of production factors.

It is an exercise of will and power. The objective can build Romania's economy. Also, if Romania enters unprepared into the Euro Zone, the benefits will be smaller than the costs.

=== The Committee for Preparing the Changeover to the Euro ===
The Committee for Preparing the Changeover to the Euro at the National Bank of Romania was originally established in 2011. The committee's original scope was to work as an advisory body to analyse aspects related to euro adoption. Another objective was to serve as a genuine platform for discussion and representatives of other public authorities were invited to attend its meetings.

The Committee's present objective relays an in-depth, comprehensive analysis within the BNR and a strong relationship among board members with the heads of central bank departments, to keep them informed about the aspects related to euro adoption. The Committee keeps its initial role as a platform for discussion because it fosters an inter-institutional dialogue to raise awareness among competent authorities about the fiscal and structural reforms necessary to provide the Romanian economy more flexibility as they changeover to the Euro.

The Committee's main topics of discussion are:

- the experience of other EU member states in preparation for changeover to the euro;
- the stage of Romania's preparation for adoption of the euro;
- the new mechanisms and concepts developed at the EU in the field of economic governance and strengthening of the Economic and Monetary Union;
- the documents of the European Commission, the European Central Bank and the Government of Romania regarding the convergence to the Eurozone of the derogating member states.

=== The National Commission for the foundation of the national plan for the adoption of the euro ===
In 2018, the Government established through a Government Emergency Ordinance a new body to help achieve sufficient convergence before changing to the euro, the National Commission for foundation of the plan for adoption of the euro. During the functioning of this National Commission, the Committee's activity would be suspended.

Romania's long-term Central Bank Governor and former 58th Prime-Minister Mugur Isărescu, admitted to giving up on the euro adoption process following 'a political decision' and taking into account the current deficit reduction crisis no new developments are expected for at least 'the next 5 to 7 years'.

=== Convergence criteria ===
Convergence criteria
Assessment date	Country	HICP inflation rate (Note: The rate of change of the 12-month average HICP over the prior 12-month average must be no more than 1.5% larger than the unweighted arithmetic average of the similar HICP inflation rates in the 3 EU member states with the lowest HICP inflation. If any of these 3 states have a HICP rate significantly below the similarly averaged HICP rate for the eurozone (which according to ECB practice means more than 2% below), and if this low HICP rate has been primarily caused by exceptional circumstances (i.e. severe wage cuts or a strong recession), then such a state is not included in the calculation of the reference value and is replaced by the EU state with the fourth lowest HICP rate.)	Excessive deficit procedure		Exchange rate		Long-term interest rate (Note: The arithmetic average of the annual yield of 10-year government bonds as of the end of the past 12 months must be no more than 2.0% larger than the unweighted arithmetic average of the bond yields in the 3 EU member states with the lowest HICP inflation. If any of these states have bond yields which are significantly larger than the similarly averaged yield for the eurozone (which according to previous ECB reports means more than 2% above) and at the same time does not have complete funding access to financial markets (which is the case for as long as a government receives bailout funds), then such a state is not to be included in the calculation of the reference value.)	Compatibility of legislation
Assessment date	Country	HICP inflation rate	Budget deficit to GDP	Debt-to-GDP ratio	ERM II member	Change in rate (Note: The change in the annual average exchange rate against the euro.)	Long-term interest rate	Compatibility of legislation
2012 ECB Report (Note: Reference values from the ECB convergence report of May 2012.)	Reference values	Max. 3.1% (Note: Sweden, Ireland and Slovenia were the reference states.) (as of 31 Mar 2012)	None open (as of 31 Mar 2012)		Min. 2 years (as of 31 Mar 2012)	Max. ±15% (Note: The maximum allowed change in rate is ± 2.25% for Denmark.) (for 2011)	Max. 5.80% (Note: Sweden and Slovenia were the reference states, with Ireland excluded as an outlier.) (as of 31 Mar 2012)	Compliant (as of 31 Mar 2012)
2012 ECB Report	Reference values	Max. 3.1% (as of 31 Mar 2012)	Max. 3.0% (FY 2011)	Max. 60% (FY 2011)	Min. 2 years (as of 31 Mar 2012)	Max. ±15% (for 2011)	Max. 5.80% (as of 31 Mar 2012)	Compliant (as of 31 Mar 2012)
2012 ECB Report	Romania	4.6%	Open		No	-0.6%	7.25%	No
2012 ECB Report	Romania	4.6%	5.2%	33.3%	No	-0.6%	7.25%	No
2013 ECB Report (Note: Reference values from the ECB convergence report of June 2013.)	Reference values	Max. 2.7% (Note: Sweden, Latvia and Ireland were the reference states.) (as of 30 Apr 2013)	None open (as of 30 Apr 2013)		Min. 2 years (as of 30 Apr 2013)	Max. ±15% (for 2012)	Max. 5.5% (as of 30 Apr 2013)	Compliant (as of 30 Apr 2013)
2013 ECB Report	Reference values	Max. 2.7% (as of 30 Apr 2013)	Max. 3.0% (FY 2012)	Max. 60% (FY 2012)	Min. 2 years (as of 30 Apr 2013)	Max. ±15% (for 2012)	Max. 5.5% (as of 30 Apr 2013)	Compliant (as of 30 Apr 2013)
2013 ECB Report	Romania	4.1%	Open (Closed in June 2013)		No	-5.2%	6.36%	Not assessed
2013 ECB Report	Romania	4.1%	2.9%	37.8%	No	-5.2%	6.36%	Not assessed
2014 ECB Report (Note: Reference values from the ECB convergence report of June 2014.)	Reference values	Max. 1.7% (Note: Latvia, Portugal and Ireland were the reference states, with Greece, Bulgaria and Cyprus excluded as outliers.) (as of 30 Apr 2014)	None open (as of 30 Apr 2014)		Min. 2 years (as of 30 Apr 2014)	Max. ±15% (for 2013)	Max. 6.2% (Note: Latvia, Ireland and Portugal were the reference states.) (as of 30 Apr 2014)	Compliant (as of 30 Apr 2014)
2014 ECB Report	Reference values	Max. 1.7% (as of 30 Apr 2014)	Max. 3.0% (FY 2013)	Max. 60% (FY 2013)	Min. 2 years (as of 30 Apr 2014)	Max. ±15% (for 2013)	Max. 6.2% (as of 30 Apr 2014)	Compliant (as of 30 Apr 2014)
2014 ECB Report	Romania	2.1%	None		No	0.9%	5.26%	No
2014 ECB Report	Romania	2.1%	2.3%	38.4%	No	0.9%	5.26%	No
2016 ECB Report (Note: Reference values from the ECB convergence report of June 2016.)	Reference values	Max. 0.7% (Note: Bulgaria, Slovenia and Spain were the reference states, with Cyprus and Romania excluded as outliers.) (as of 30 Apr 2016)	None open (as of 18 May 2016)		Min. 2 years (as of 18 May 2016)	Max. ±15% (for 2015)	Max. 4.0% (Note: Slovenia, Spain and Bulgaria were the reference states.) (as of 30 Apr 2016)	Compliant (as of 18 May 2016)
2016 ECB Report	Reference values	Max. 0.7% (as of 30 Apr 2016)	Max. 3.0% (FY 2015)	Max. 60% (FY 2015)	Min. 2 years (as of 18 May 2016)	Max. ±15% (for 2015)	Max. 4.0% (as of 30 Apr 2016)	Compliant (as of 18 May 2016)
2016 ECB Report	Romania	-1.3%	None		No	0.0%	3.6%	No
2016 ECB Report	Romania	-1.3%	0.7%	38.4%	No	0.0%	3.6%	No
2018 ECB Report (Note: Reference values from the ECB convergence report of May 2018.)	Reference values	Max. 1.9% (Note: Cyprus, Ireland and Finland were the reference states.) (as of 31 Mar 2018)	None open (as of 3 May 2018)		Min. 2 years (as of 3 May 2018)	Max. ±15% (for 2017)	Max. 3.2% (Note: Cyprus, Ireland and Finland were the reference states.) (as of 31 Mar 2018)	Compliant (as of 20 March 2018)
2018 ECB Report	Reference values	Max. 1.9% (as of 31 Mar 2018)	Max. 3.0% (FY 2017)	Max. 60% (FY 2017)	Min. 2 years (as of 3 May 2018)	Max. ±15% (for 2017)	Max. 3.2% (as of 31 Mar 2018)	Compliant (as of 20 March 2018)
2018 ECB Report	Romania	1.9%	None		No	-1.7%	4.1%	No
2018 ECB Report	Romania	1.9%	2.9%	35.0%	No	-1.7%	4.1%	No
2020 ECB Report (Note: Reference values from the ECB convergence report of June 2020.)	Reference values	Max. 1.8% (Note: Portugal, Cyprus, and Italy were the reference states.) (as of 31 Mar 2020)	None open (as of 7 May 2020)		Min. 2 years (as of 7 May 2020)	Max. ±15% (for 2019)	Max. 2.9% (Note: Portugal, Cyprus, and Italy were the reference states.) (as of 31 Mar 2020)	Compliant (as of 24 March 2020)
2020 ECB Report	Reference values	Max. 1.8% (as of 31 Mar 2020)	Max. 3.0% (FY 2019)	Max. 60% (FY 2019)	Min. 2 years (as of 7 May 2020)	Max. ±15% (for 2019)	Max. 2.9% (as of 31 Mar 2020)	Compliant (as of 24 March 2020)
2020 ECB Report	Romania	3.7%	Open		No	-2.0%	4.4%	No
2020 ECB Report	Romania	3.7%	4.3%	35.2%	No	-2.0%	4.4%	No
2022 ECB Report (Note: Reference values from the Convergence Report of June 2022.)	Reference values	Max. 4.9% (Note: France, Finland, and Greece were the reference states.) (as of April 2022)	None open (as of 25 May 2022)		Min. 2 years (as of 25 May 2022)	Max. ±15% (for 2021)	Max. 2.6% (as of April 2022)	Compliant (as of 25 March 2022)
2022 ECB Report	Reference values	Max. 4.9% (as of April 2022)	Max. 3.0% (FY 2021)	Max. 60% (FY 2021)	Min. 2 years (as of 25 May 2022)	Max. ±15% (for 2021)	Max. 2.6% (as of April 2022)	Compliant (as of 25 March 2022)
2022 ECB Report	Romania	6.4%	Open		No	-1.7%	4.7%	No
2022 ECB Report	Romania	6.4%	7.1%	48.8%	No	-1.7%	4.7%	No
2024 ECB Report (Note: Reference values from the Convergence Report of June 2024.)	Reference values	Max. 3.3% (Note: Belgium, Denmark, and the Netherlands were the reference states.) (as of May 2024)	None open (as of 19 June 2024)		Min. 2 years (as of 19 June 2024)	Max. ±15% (for 2023)	Max. 4.8% (as of May 2024)	Compliant (as of 27 March 2024)
2024 ECB Report	Reference values	Max. 3.3% (as of May 2024)	Max. 3.0% (FY 2023)	Max. 60% (FY 2023)	Min. 2 years (as of 19 June 2024)	Max. ±15% (for 2023)	Max. 4.8% (as of May 2024)	Compliant (as of 27 March 2024)
2024 ECB Report	Romania	7.6%	Open		No	−0.3%	6.4%	No
2024 ECB Report	Romania	7.6%	6.6%	48.8%	No	−0.3%	6.4%	No
2025 ECB Report (Note: Reference values from the Convergence Report of June 2025.)	Reference values	Max. 2.8% (Note: Finland, Ireland, and Italy were the reference states.) (as of April 2025)	None open (as of 19 May 2025)		Min. 2 years (as of 19 May 2025)	Max. ±15% (for 2024)	Max. 5.1% (as of April 2025)	Compliant (as of 15 April 2025)
2025 ECB Report	Reference values	Max. 2.8% (as of April 2025)	Max. 3.0% (FY 2024)	Max. 60% (FY 2024)	Min. 2 years (as of 19 May 2025)	Max. ±15% (for 2024)	Max. 5.1% (as of April 2025)	Compliant (as of 15 April 2025)
2025 ECB Report	Romania	5.3%	Open		No	−0.6%	6.6%	Not assessed
2025 ECB Report	Romania	5.3%	9.3%	54.8%	No	−0.6%	6.6%	Not assessed
2026 ECB Report (Note: Reference values from the Convergence Report of June 2026.)	Reference values	Max. 2.7% (Note: Cyprus, Denmark, and France were the reference states.) (as of May 2026)	None open (as of 17 June 2026)		Min. 2 years (as of 17 June 2026)	Max. ±15% (for 2025)	Max. 5.1% (as of May 2026)	Compliant (as of 25 March 2026)
2026 ECB Report	Reference values	Max. 2.7% (as of May 2026)	Max. 3.0% (FY 2025)	Max. 60% (FY 2025)	Min. 2 years (as of 17 June 2026)	Max. ±15% (for 2025)	Max. 5.1% (as of May 2026)	Compliant (as of 25 March 2026)
2026 ECB Report	Romania	8.4%	Open		No	−1.4%	6.7%	No
2026 ECB Report	Romania	8.4%	7.9%	59.3%	No	−1.4%	6.7%	No

Criterion fulfilled
Criterion potentially fulfilled: If the budget deficit exceeds the 3% limit, but is "close" to this value (the European Commission has deemed 3.5% to be close by in the past), then the criteria can still potentially be fulfilled if either the deficits in the previous two years are significantly declining towards the 3% limit, or if the excessive deficit is the result of exceptional circumstances which are temporary in nature (i.e. one-off expenditures triggered by a significant economic downturn, or by the implementation of economic reforms that are expected to deliver a significant positive impact on the government's future fiscal budgets). However, even if such "special circumstances" are found to exist, additional criteria must also be met to comply with the fiscal budget criterion. Additionally, if the debt-to-GDP ratio exceeds 60% but is "sufficiently diminishing and approaching the reference value at a satisfactory pace" it can be deemed to be in compliance.
Criterion not fulfilled

== Public opinion ==
Public support for the euro in Romania

The following are polls on the question of whether Romania should abolish the leu and adopt the euro.

Date (survey taken)	Date (survey published)	Yes	No	Undecided / Don't know	Conducted by
March 2026	June 2026	65%	33%	2%	Eurobarometer
March 2025	June 2025	71%	29%	0%	Eurobarometer
May 2024	June 2024	77%	23%	1%	Eurobarometer
April 2023	June 2023	71%	29%	1%	Eurobarometer
April 2022	June 2022	77%	22%	1%	Eurobarometer
May 2021	July 2021	75%	23%	3%	Eurobarometer
June 2020	July 2020	63%	30%	7%	Eurobarometer
April 2019	June 2019	61%	31%	8%	Eurobarometer
April 2018	May 2018	69%	27%	4%	Eurobarometer
April 2017	May 2017	64%	30%	6%	Eurobarometer
April 2016	May 2016	64%	33%	3%	Eurobarometer
April 2015	May 2015	68%	26%	6%	Eurobarometer
April 2014	June 2014	74%	24%	2%	Eurobarometer
April 2013	June 2013	67%	28%	5%	Eurobarometer
April 2012	July 2012	64%	30%	6%	Eurobarometer
November 2011	July 2012	63%	31%	6%	Eurobarometer
May 2011	August 2011	51%	29%	20%	Eurobarometer
September 2010	December 2010	51%	34%	15%	Eurobarometer
May 2010	July 2010	55%	28%	17%	Eurobarometer
September 2009	November 2009	60%	23%	17%	Eurobarometer
May 2009	December 2009	59%	24%	17%	Eurobarometer
May 2008	July 2008	61%	21%	17%	Eurobarometer
September 2007	November 2007	62%	19%	19%	Eurobarometer
March 2007	May 2007	59%	24%	17%	Eurobarometer

A Flash Eurobarometer from 2019 showed that a majority of Romanian respondents support introducing the Euro on the national market. With a decrease of 8 percentage points, 61% of Romanians are in favour of Euro adoption.

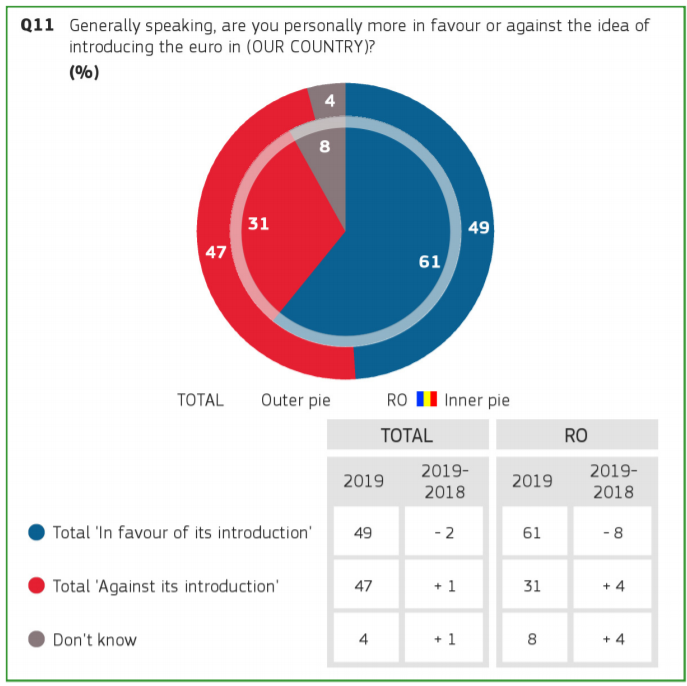
The percentage Romanians in favour of against adopting the Euro.

When referring to the positive impact of the changeover from the national currency to the Euro, 52% of the Romanian respondents think that the common currency had a positive impact on the Eurozone Member States that already use it.

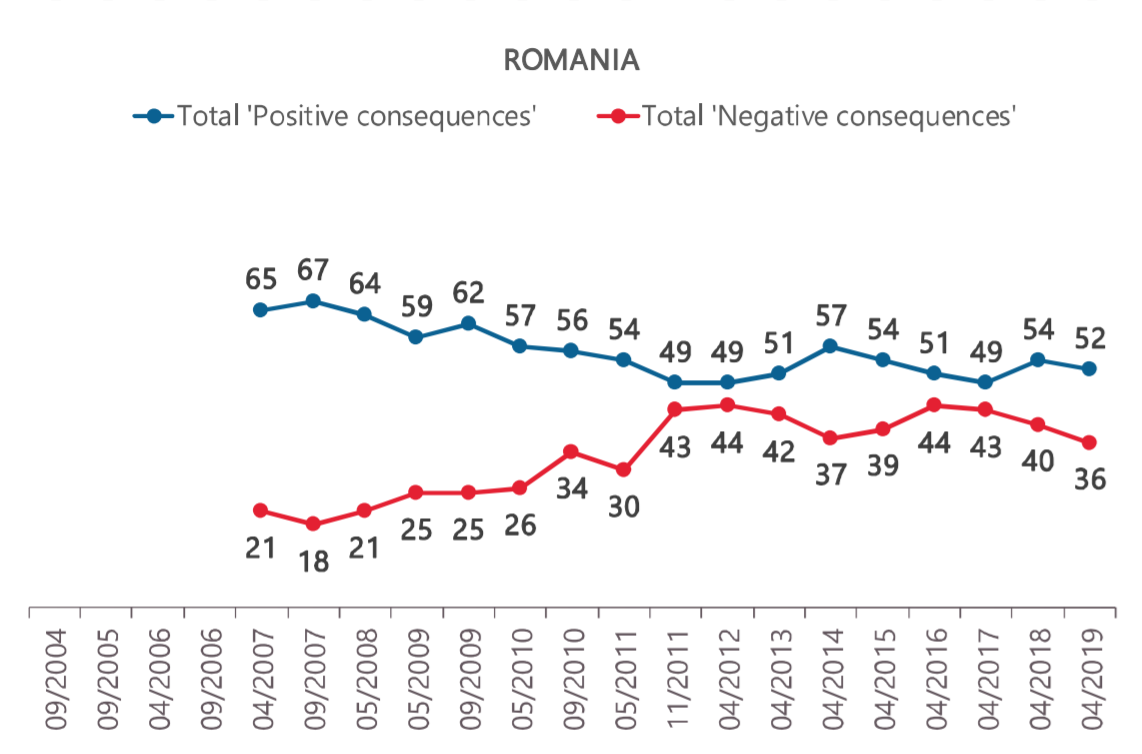
Do you think the introduction of the Euro would have positive or negative consequences for the national economy?

An April 2022 Eurobarometer poll showed strong support for the Euro in Romania. According to the poll, 65 percent responded yes to the question "Do you think the introduction of the euro would have positive or negative consequences for Romania? (33 percent responded no). In the same poll, 77 percent responded yes to the question "Generally speaking, are you personally more in favour or against the idea of introducing the euro in Romania? (22 percent responded no).

== See also ==
- 2007 enlargement of the European Union
- Enlargement of the Eurozone
