= Euro convergence criteria =

Criteria which European Union member states must meet to adopt the euro as their currency

In the European Union, the convergence criteria (also known as the Maastricht criteria) are five criteria that member states are required to meet to enter the third stage of the Economic and Monetary Union (EMU) and adopt the euro as their currency. The four main criteria, which actually comprise five criteria as the "fiscal criterion" consists of both a "debt criterion" and a "deficit criterion", are based on Article 140 (ex article 121.1) of the Treaty on the Functioning of the European Union.

Full EMU membership is only open to EU member states. However, the European microstates of Andorra, Monaco, San Marino and the Vatican City, which are not members of the EU, have signed monetary agreements with the EU which allow them officially to adopt the euro and issue their own variant of euro coins. These states had all previously used one of the eurozone currencies replaced by the euro, or a currency pegged to one of them. These states are not members of the eurozone and do not get a seat in the European Central Bank (ECB) or the Eurogroup.

As part of the EU treaty, all of the EU Member States are obliged to adhere to the Stability and Growth Pact (SGP), which serves as a framework to ensure price stability and fiscal responsibility, has adopted identical limits for governments budget deficit and debt as the convergence criteria. As several countries did not exercise a sufficient level of fiscal responsibility during the first 10 years of the euro's lifetime, two major SGP reforms were subsequently introduced. The first reform was the Sixpack which entered into force in December 2011, and it was followed in January 2013 by the even more ambitious Fiscal Compact, which was signed by 25 out of the then-27 EU member states.

Countries are expected to participate in the second version of the European Exchange Rate Mechanism (ERM-II) for at least two years before joining the Euro.

== Criteria ==
The Maastricht Treaty, which was signed in February 1992 and entered into force on 1 November 1993, outlined the five convergence criteria EU member states are required to comply with to adopt the new currency, the euro. The purpose of setting the criteria was to achieve price stability within the eurozone and ensure it wasn't negatively impacted when new member states accede. The framework of the five criteria was outlined by article 109j.1 of the Maastricht Treaty, and the attached Protocol on the Convergence Criteria and Protocol on the Excessive Deficit Procedure. The original treaty article was later renumbered to become article 121.1 of the Amsterdam Treaty, and later renumbered again to Article 140 of the Treaty on the Functioning of the European Union. Aside from the renumbering, no significant change have happened to the content of the "convergence criteria article" and its referred to Protocol on the Convergence Criteria and Protocol on the Excessive Deficit Procedure. The precise definition and method of measuring compliance was subsequently further developed by the EMI (later known as ECB) in their first three reports published in April 1995, November 1995 and November 1996. The full definition of the five criteria are summarised below.

1. HICP inflation (12-months average of yearly rates): Shall not exceed the HICP reference value, which is calculated by the end of the last month with available data as the unweighted arithmetic average of the similar HICP inflation rates in the 3 EU member states with the lowest HICP inflation plus 1.5 percentage points. However, EU member states with an HICP rate significantly below the eurozone average (and pre 1999 below "comparable rates in other Member States"), do not qualify as a benchmark country for the reference value and will be ignored, if it can be established its price developments have been strongly affected by exceptional factors (i.e. severe enforced wage cuts, exceptional developments in energy/food/currency markets, or a strong recession). For example, at the April 2014 assessment: Greece, Bulgaria and Cyprus with HICP values respectively 2.2, 1.8 and 1.4 percentage points below the eurozone average, were all found to have suffered from exceptional factors, and hence concluded to be outliers, causing the reference limit instead to be calculated based on the HICP values from the three states with the 4th to 6th lowest HICP values in EU.
2. Government budget deficit: The ratio of the annual general government deficit relative to gross domestic product (GDP) at market prices, must not exceed 3% at the end of the preceding fiscal year (based on notified measured data) and neither for any of the two subsequent years (based on the European Commission's published forecast data). Deficits being "slightly above the limit" (previously outlined by the evaluation practice to mean deficits in the range from 3.0 to 3.5%), will as a standard rule not be accepted, unless it can be established that either: "1) The deficit ratio has declined substantially and continuously before reaching the level close to the 3% limit" or "2) The small deficit ratio excess above the 3% limit has been caused by exceptional circumstances and has a temporary nature (i.e. expenditure one-offs triggered by a significant economic downturn, or expenditure one-offs triggered by the implementation of economic reforms with a positive mid/long-term effect)". If a state is found by the commission to have breached the deficit criteria, they will recommend the Council of the European Union to open up a deficit-breached EDP against the state in accordance with Article 126(6), which only will be abrogated again when the state simultaneously comply with both the deficit and debt criteria.
3. Government debt-to-GDP ratio: The ratio of gross government debt (measured at its nominal value outstanding at the end of the year, and consolidated between and within the sectors of general government) relative to GDP at market prices, must not exceed 60% at the end of the preceding fiscal year. Or if the debt-to-GDP ratio exceeds the 60% limit, the ratio shall at least be found to have "sufficiently diminished and must be approaching the reference value at a satisfactory pace". This "satisfactory pace" was defined and operationalised by a specific calculation formula, with the entry into force of the new debt reduction benchmark rule in December 2011, requiring the states in breach of the 60% limit to deliver – either for the backward- or forward-looking 3-year period – an annual debt-to-GDP ratio reduction of at least 5% of the part of the benchmark value being in excess of the 60% limit. If both the 60% limit and "debt reduction benchmark rule" is breached, the commission will finally check if the breach has been caused only by certain special exempted causes (i.e. capital payments to establishment of common financial stability mechanisms, like the ESM) – because if this is the case they will then rule an "exempted compliance". If a state is found by the commission to have breached the debt criteria (without this breach solely being due to "exempted causes"), they will recommend the Council of the European Union to open up a debt-breached EDP against the state in accordance with Article 126(6), which only will be abrogated again when the state simultaneously comply with both the deficit and debt criteria.
4. Exchange rate stability: Applicant countries should not have devalued the central rate of their euro pegged currency during the previous two years, and for the same period the currency stability shall be deemed to have been stable without "severe tensions". As a third requirement, participation in the exchange-rate mechanism (ERM / ERM II) under the European Monetary System (EMS) for two consecutive years is expected, though according to the Commission "exchange rate stability during a period of non-participation before entering ERM II can be taken into account." For example, Italy was deemed to have converged with only 15 months as an ERM-member, as measured on the last day in the review period of the convergence report. Meanwhile, the European Commission concluded that for Cyprus, Malta and Latvia, their 18 months of membership in the review period ending on 31 October 2006 was insufficient. As of 2014, all 29 times the subcriteria for ERM-membership length were found complied with by the commission, these cases had the particular observation in common, that the state had surpassed minimum two full years of ERM-membership either ahead of the "final approval date (following approximately 1.5 month after the publication of the convergence report) where their currency exchange rate would be irrevocably fixed by the Council of the European Union" or by the "first possible euro adoption date following the publication of the convergence report".
5. Long-term interest rates (average yields for 10-year government bonds in the past year): Shall be no more than 2.0 percentage points higher than the unweighted arithmetic average of the similar 10-year government bond yields in the 3 EU member states with the lowest HICP inflation (having qualified as benchmark countries for the calculation of the HICP reference value). If any of the 3 EU member states in concern are suffering from interest rates significantly higher than the "GDP-weighted eurozone average interest rate", and at the same time by the end of the assessment period have no complete funding access to the financial lending markets (which will be the case for as long as a country is unable to issue new government bonds with 10-year maturity – instead being dependent on disbursements from a sovereign state bailout programme), then such a country will not qualify as a benchmark country for the reference value; which then only will be calculated upon data from fewer than 3 EU member states. In example, Ireland was found to be an interest rate outlier not qualifying for the reference value calculation in the assessment month March 2012, when it was measured to have a long-term interest rate average being 4.71 percentage points above the eurozone average – while at the same time having no complete access to the financial lending markets. When Ireland was assessed again in April 2013, it was, however, deemed no longer to be an outlier, due to posting a long-term interest rate average only 1.59 percentage points above the eurozone average – while also having regained complete access to the financial lending markets for the last 1.5 month of the assessment period. A final relevant example appeared in April 2014, when Portugal likewise was found not to be an interest rate outlier, due to posting a long-term interest rate average being 2.89 percentage points above the eurozone average – while having regained complete access to the financial lending markets for the last 12 months of the assessment period.

The ECB publishes a Convergence Report at least every two years to check how well the EU members aspiring for euro adoption comply with the criteria. The first full convergence report was published in November 1996, and concluded only 3 out of 15 EU member states (Denmark, Luxembourg and Ireland) were completely compliant with the criteria at that point in time. As a majority of states were not in compliance, the Council decided to delay the introduction of the euro by two years to 1 January 1999. In March 1998 a more positive second convergence report concluded that 11 out of 12 applying countries were prepared for the electronic introduction of the euro on 1 January 1999, with only Greece failing to qualify by the deadline. Subsequent convergence reports have so far resulted in an additional 10 EU member states complying with all criteria and adopting the euro (Greece, Slovenia, Cyprus, Malta, Slovakia, Estonia, Latvia, Lithuania, Croatia and Bulgaria). The latest convergence report was published in June 2014, and checked for compliance in the reference year from May 2012 – April 2014, where Lithuania managed to fully comply – thus becoming the next 19th eurozone member. As the reference values for HICP inflation and long-term interest rates change on a monthly basis, any member state with a euro derogation has the right to ask the ECB for an updated compliance check, whenever they believe they have met all both economic and legal convergence criteria. For example, Latvia asked for such an extraordinary compliance check in March 2013 (outside the regular 2-year interval for automatic assessments).

EU member states which have not adopted the euro
Country	Currency (Code)	Central rate per €1	EU join date	ERM II join date	Government policy on euro adoption	Convergence criteria compliance (as of the most recent compliance assessment for each country)	Notes
Czech Republic	Koruna (CZK)	Free floating	2004-05-01	N/A	Not on government's agenda	Compliant with 3 out of 5 criteria	
Denmark	Krone (DKK)	7.46038	1973-01-01	1999-01-01	Not on government's agenda	Not assessed due to opt-out from eurozone membership	Rejected euro adoption by referendum in 2000
Hungary	Forint (HUF)	Free floating	2004-05-01	N/A	Possible adoption in 2030 or 2031	Not compliant with any of the 5 criteria	
Poland	Złoty (PLN)	Free floating	2004-05-01	N/A	Not on government's agenda	Not compliant with any of the 5 criteria	
Romania	Leu (RON)	Free floating	2007-01-01	N/A	Possible adoption in 2032 or 2035	Not compliant with any of the 5 criteria	
Sweden	Krona (SEK)	Free floating	1995-01-01	N/A	Not on government's agenda	Compliant with 3 out of 5 criteria	Rejected euro adoption by referendum in 2003 (Note: Sweden is still obliged to adopt the euro under its Treaty of Accession once compliant with all convergence criteria, but it has chosen to deliberately fail to meet those criteria by not joining ERM II without prior approval in a referendum.)

In 2009, the authors of a confidential International Monetary Fund (IMF) report suggested that due to the Great Recession, the EU Council should consider granting new EU member states which are having difficulty complying with all five convergence criteria the option to "partially adopt" the euro, along the lines of the monetary agreements signed with the European microstates outside the EU. These states would gain the right to adopt the euro and issue a national variant of euro coins, but would not get a seat in ECB or the Eurogroup until they met all the convergence criteria. However, the EU has not made use of this alternative accession process.

== Fulfilment of criteria ==
Convergence criteria (as of the compliance assessment conducted by the ECB in their June 2026 Report)
Country	HICP inflation rate (Note: The rate of change of the 12-month average HICP over the prior 12-month average must be no more than 1.5% larger than the unweighted arithmetic average of the similar HICP inflation rates in the 3 EU member states with the lowest HICP inflation. If any of these 3 states have a HICP rate significantly below the similarly averaged HICP rate for the eurozone (which according to ECB practice means more than 2% below), and if this low HICP rate has been primarily caused by exceptional circumstances (i.e. severe wage cuts or a strong recession), then such a state is not included in the calculation of the reference value and is replaced by the EU state with the fourth lowest HICP rate.)	Excessive deficit procedure		Exchange rate		Long-term interest rate (Note: The arithmetic average of the annual yield of 10-year government bonds as of the end of the past 12 months must be no more than 2.0% larger than the unweighted arithmetic average of the bond yields in the 3 EU member states with the lowest HICP inflation. If any of these states have bond yields which are significantly larger than the similarly averaged yield for the eurozone (which according to previous ECB reports means more than 2% above) and at the same time does not have complete funding access to financial markets (which is the case for as long as a government receives bailout funds), then such a state is not to be included in the calculation of the reference value.)	Compatibility of legislation
Country	HICP inflation rate	Budget deficit to GDP	Debt-to-GDP ratio	ERM II member	Change in rate (Note: The change in the annual average exchange rate against the euro.)	Long-term interest rate	Compatibility of legislation
Reference values (Note: Reference values from the Convergence Report of June 2026.)	Max. 2.7% (Note: Cyprus, Denmark, and France were the reference states.) (as of May 2026)	None open (as of 17 June 2026)		Min. 2 years (as of 17 June 2026)	Max. ±15% (Note: The maximum allowed change in rate is ± 2.25% for Denmark.) (for 2025)	Max. 5.1% (as of May 2026)	Compliant (as of 25 March 2026)
Reference values	Max. 2.7% (as of May 2026)	Max. 3.0% (FY 2025)	Max. 60% (FY 2025)	Min. 2 years (as of 17 June 2026)	Max. ±15% (for 2025)	Max. 5.1% (as of May 2026)	Compliant (as of 25 March 2026)
Czech Republic	1.9%	None		No	1.7%	4.5%	No
Czech Republic	1.9%	2.1%	44.3%	No	1.7%	4.5%	No
Denmark	1.6%	None		27 years, 5 months	−0.6%	2.6%	Not assessed
Denmark	1.6%	−2.9% (surplus)	27.9%	27 years, 5 months	−0.6%	2.6%	Not assessed
Hungary	3.3%	Open		No	−0.6%	6.7%	No
Hungary	3.3%	4.7%	74.6%	No	−0.6%	6.7%	No
Poland	2.9%	Open		No	1.5%	5.4%	No
Poland	2.9%	7.3%	59.7%	No	1.5%	5.4%	No
Romania	8.4%	Open		No	−1.4%	6.7%	No
Romania	8.4%	7.9%	59.3%	No	−1.4%	6.7%	No
Sweden	2.2%	None		No	3.2%	2.6%	No
Sweden	2.2%	1.3%	35.1%	No	3.2%	2.6%	No

Criterion fulfilled
Criterion potentially fulfilled: If the budget deficit exceeds the 3% limit, but is "close" to this value (the European Commission has deemed 3.5% to be close by in the past), then the criteria can still potentially be fulfilled if either the deficits in the previous two years are significantly declining towards the 3% limit, or if the excessive deficit is the result of exceptional circumstances which are temporary in nature (i.e. one-off expenditures triggered by a significant economic downturn, or by the implementation of economic reforms that are expected to deliver a significant positive impact on the government's future fiscal budgets). However, even if such "special circumstances" are found to exist, additional criteria must also be met to comply with the fiscal budget criterion. Additionally, if the debt-to-GDP ratio exceeds 60% but is "sufficiently diminishing and approaching the reference value at a satisfactory pace" it can be deemed to be in compliance.
Criterion not fulfilled

=== Reference values ===
The compliance check above was conducted in June 2025, with the HICP and interest rate reference values specifically applying for the last assessment month with available data (April 2025). As reference values for HICP and interest rates are subject for monthly changes, any EU member state with a euro derogation, has the right to ask for a renewed compliance check at any time during the year. For this potential additional assessment, the table below feature Eurostat's monthly recalculation of criteria values being used in the calculation process to determine the upper limit for HICP inflation and long-term interest rates, where a certain fixed buffer value is added to the moving yearly average for the three EU Member States with the lowest HICP figures (ignoring states classified as "outliers").

The black values in the table are sourced by the officially published convergence reports, while the lime-green values are only qualified estimates – not confirmed by any official convergence report – but sourced by monthly estimation reports published by the Polish Ministry of Finance. The reason why the lime-green values are only estimates, is because the "outlier" selection – ignoring certain states from the reference value calculation – beside of depending on a quantitative assessment also depends on a more complicated overall qualitative assessment, and hence it can not be predicted with absolute certainty who of the states the commission will deem to be outliers. Thus, any selection of outliers by the lime-green data lines shall only be regarded as qualified estimates – which potentially could be different from those outliers which the commission would have selected if they had published a specific report at the concerned point of time. (Note: A particular high uncertainty exists for the Polish selection of HICP outliers, as it is only based upon evaluation of the first part of the official outlier criteria. The official outlier criteria require both (1) The HICP rate to be significantly below the eurozone average and (2) This "significant below" HICP to stem from adverse price developments from exceptional factors (i.e., severe enforced wage cuts, exceptional developments in energy/food/currency markets, or a strong recession). Precedent assessment cases proof the second part of the outlier criteria also needs to be met, i.e. Finland had a HICP criteria value being 1.7% below eurozone average in August 2004 without being classified to be "HICP outlier" by the European Commission, and Sweden likewise had a HICP criteria value being 1.4% below eurozone average in April 2013 without being classified to be "HICP outlier" by the European Commission. In addition to the uncertainty related to the fact that the Polish source only evaluate the first requirement, there is also uncertainty related to the Polish quantification of what "significant below" means. For all assessment months until March 2014, the Polish source had adopted the assumption (based on precedent assessment cases) that "all states with HICP criteria values minimum 1.8% below eurozone average" should be classified to be "HICP outliers". Based on the 2014 EC Convergence report's classification of Cyprus with a HICP criteria value only 1.4% below eurozone average as a "HICP outlier", the Polish source accordingly also adjusted their "HICP outlier selection criteria" from April 2014 onwards, so that it now automatically classify "all states with HICP criteria values minimum 1.4% below eurozone average" as "HICP outliers". The European Commission never quantified what "significant below" means, which is why the Polish source attempts to quantify it based on precedent assessment cases, but this also mean it is uncertain whether or not the currently assumed 1.4% limit is correct – because it could perhaps just as well be 1.0%.)

The national fiscal accounts for the previous full calendar year are released each year in April (next time 23 April 2015). As the compliance check for both the debt and deficit criteria always awaits this release in a new calendar year, the first possible month to request a compliance check will be April, which would result in a data check for the HICP and Interest rates during the reference year from 1 April to 31 March. Any EU Member State may also ask the European Commission to conduct a compliance check, at any point of time during the remainder of the year, with HICP and interest rates always checked for the past 12 months – while debt and deficit compliance always will be checked for the 3-year period encompassing the last completed full calendar year and the two subsequent forecast years. As of 12 September 2014, all of the remaining euro derogation states without an opt-out had not yet entered ERM-II, which mean it's highly unlikely any of them will ask the European Commission to conduct an extraordinary compliance check ahead of the publication of the next regular convergence report (scheduled for release in May/June 2016).

== See also ==
- Maastricht Treaty
- Enlargement of the eurozone
- Economy of the European Union#Economies of member states which contains values also for eurozone countries.
- Copenhagen criteria
- Stability and Growth Pact
- European Exchange Rate Mechanism
