= European Exchange Rate Mechanism =

European system to reduce exchange rate variability after the Euro

Eurozone
EU member in ERM II, with an opt-out
EU members not in ERM II, but committed to join the eurozone after meeting the convergence criteria
Non–EU members using the euro with a monetary agreement
Non–EU members using the euro unilaterally

The European Exchange Rate Mechanism (ERM II) is a system introduced by the European Economic Community on 1 January 1999 alongside the introduction of a single currency, the euro (replacing ERM 1 and the euro's predecessor, the ECU) as part of the European Monetary System (EMS), to reduce exchange rate variability and achieve monetary stability in Europe.

Following the adoption of the euro, policy changed to linking currencies of EU countries outside the eurozone to the euro (having the common currency as a central point). The goal was to improve the stability of those currencies, as well as to gain an evaluation mechanism for potential eurozone members. As of January 2026, the Danish krone is the only currency participating in the ERM II.

== Intent and operation ==
The ERM is based on the concept of fixed currency exchange rate margins, but with exchange rates variable within those margins. This is also known as a semi-pegged system. Before the introduction of the euro, exchange rates were based on the European Currency Unit (ECU), the European unit of account, whose value was determined as a weighted average of the participating currencies.

A grid (known as the Parity Grid) of bilateral rates was calculated on the basis of these central rates expressed in ECUs, and currency fluctuations had to be contained within a margin of 2.25% on either side of the bilateral rates (with the exception of the Italian lira, the Spanish peseta, the Portuguese escudo and Pound sterling, which were allowed to fluctuate by ±6%). Determined intervention and loan arrangements protected the participating currencies from greater exchange rate fluctuations.

United Kingdom Chancellor of the Exchequer Denis Healey reportedly chose not to join the ERM in 1979 owing to concerns that it would benefit the German economy by preventing the Deutsche Mark from appreciating, at the expense of the economies of other countries. The UK did join the ERM in October 1990 under Chancellor John Major, in a move which at the time was largely supported by business and the press, but was forced to leave again two years later on Black Wednesday.

== Historical exchange-rate regimes for EU members ==
The chart below provides a full summary of all applying exchange-rate regimes for EU members, since the European Monetary System with its Exchange Rate Mechanism and the related new common currency ECU came into being on 13 March 1979. The euro replaced the ECU 1:1 at the exchange rate markets, on 1 January 1999. Between 1979 and 1999 the Deutsche Mark functioned as a de facto anchor for the ECU, meaning there was only a minor difference between pegging a currency against the ECU and pegging it against the Mark.

Sources: EC convergence reports 1996-2014, Italian lira, Spanish peseta, Portuguese escudo, Finnish markka, Greek drachma, Sterling

The eurozone was established with its first 11 member states on 1 January 1999. The first enlargement of the eurozone, to Greece, took place on 1 January 2001, one year before the euro had physically entered into circulation. The zone's next enlargements were with states that joined the EU in 2004, and then joined the eurozone on 1 January in the mentioned year: Slovenia (2007), Cyprus (2008), Malta (2008), Slovakia (2009), Estonia (2011), Latvia (2014), Lithuania (2015). Croatia, which joined in the EU 2013, adopted the euro in 2023, while Bulgaria did in 2026.

All new EU members having joined the bloc after the signing of the Maastricht Treaty in 1992 are obliged to adopt the euro under the terms of their accession treaties. However, the last of the five economic convergence criteria, which need to be complied with in order to qualify for euro adoption, is the exchange rate stability criterion. This requires having been a member of the ERM for a minimum of two years without the presence of "severe tensions" for the currency exchange rate.

=== Parity break of the Irish pound and sterling ===
To participate in the European Monetary System, Ireland chose to break the Irish pound's parity with sterling in 1979, because the UK had decided not to participate. (The Irish Central Bank had maintained parity with sterling since the foundation of the state in 1922. "It was only in the 1970s, when high inflation in the UK threatened price stability in Ireland, that alternatives were seriously considered".)

=== Forced withdrawal of the UK ===
The United Kingdom entered the ERM in October 1990, but was forced to exit the programme within two years after sterling came under major pressure from currency speculators. The ensuing crash of 16 September 1992 was subsequently dubbed "Black Wednesday". There was some revision of attitude towards this event given the UK's strong economic performance after 1992, with some commentators dubbing it "White Wednesday".

Some commentators, following Norman Tebbit, took to referring to ERM as an "Eternal Recession Mechanism", after the UK fell into recession in 1990. The UK spent over £6 billion trying to keep the currency within the narrow limits with reports at the time widely noting that the controversial Hungarian-American investor George Soros's individual profit of £1 billion equated to over £12 for each man, woman and child in Britain and dubbing Soros "the man who broke the Bank of England".

Britain's membership of the ERM was also blamed for prolonging the recession at the time, and Britain's exit from the ERM was seen as an economic failure which contributed significantly to the defeat of the Conservative government of John Major at the general election in May 1997, despite the strong economic recovery and significant fall in unemployment which that government had overseen after Black Wednesday.

=== Increase of margins ===
In August 1993, the margin was expanded to 15% to accommodate speculation against the French franc and other currencies.

== History ==
On 31 December 1998, the European Currency Unit (ECU) exchange rates of the eurozone countries were frozen and the value of the euro, which then superseded the ECU at par, was thus established.

In 1999, ERM II replaced the original ERM. The Greek and Danish currencies were part of the new mechanism, but when Greece joined the euro in 2001, the Danish krone was left at that time as the only participant member. A currency in ERM II is allowed to float within a range of ±15% with respect to a central rate against the euro. In the case of the krone, Danmarks Nationalbank keeps the exchange rate within the narrower range of ± 2.25% against the central rate of EUR 1 = DKK 7.46038.

EU countries that have not adopted the euro are expected to participate for at least two years in ERM II before joining the eurozone.

=== New EU members ===
On 1 May 2004, the ten national central banks (NCBs) of the new member countries became party to the ERM II Central Bank Agreement. The national currencies themselves were to become part of the ERM II at dates to be agreed.

The Estonian kroon, Lithuanian litas, and Slovenian tolar were included in the ERM II on 28 June 2004; the Cypriot pound, the Latvian lats and the Maltese lira on 2 May 2005; the Slovak koruna on 28 November 2005.

On 10 July 2020 it was announced that the Bulgarian lev (which had joined the EU on 1 January 2007) and Croatian kuna (which had joined the EU on 1 July 2013) would be included in the ERM II.

These states have all since joined the eurozone, and hence left ERM II: Slovenia (1 January 2007), Cyprus (1 January 2008), Malta (1 January 2008), Slovakia (1 January 2009), Estonia (1 January 2011), Latvia (1 January 2014), Lithuania (1 January 2015), Croatia (1 January 2023), and Bulgaria (1 January 2026).

=== Current status ===
As of January 2026, the Danish krone is the only currency participating in ERM II. The currencies of Sweden (the Swedish krona), the three largest countries which joined the European Union on 1 May 2004 (the Polish złoty, the Czech koruna, and the Hungarian forint), and Romania which joined on 1 January 2007 (the Romanian leu), are required to join in accordance with the terms of the applicable treaties of accession.

Sweden voted in a 2003 referendum to stay out of the mechanism, despite being expected to join by the ECB, since Sweden has no opt-out like Denmark. EU members are required to join the ERM by the Maastricht convergence criteria. Romania aims to meet the conditions to join the ERM II mechanism and enter the eurozone by the end of 2030.

=== Exchange rate bands ===
In theory, most of the currencies are allowed to fluctuate as much as 15% from their assigned value. In practice, however, the currency of Denmark deviates very little.

Date of entry	Country	Currency	€1 =	Band		Notes
Date of entry	Country	Currency	€1 =	Nominal	Actual	Notes
1 January 1999	Denmark	Krone (kr.)	7.46038	2.25%	<1%	The krone entered the ERM II in 1999, when the euro was created. See Denmark and the euro for more information.

==== Historical reference ====
The former members of ERM II are the Greek drachma, Slovenian tolar, Cypriot pound, Estonian kroon, Maltese lira, Slovak koruna, Latvian lats, Lithuanian litas, Croatian kuna and Bulgarian lev.

Period	Country	Currency	€1.00 =	Band		Notes
Period	Country	Currency	€1.00 =	Nominal	Actual	Notes
1 January 1999 – 16 January 2000	Greece	Drachma (₯)	353.109	15%	Unknown	
17 January 2000 – 31 December 2000	Greece	Drachma (₯)	340.75	15%	Unknown	
28 June 2004 – 31 December 2006	Slovenia	Tolar (SIT)	239.64	15%	0.16%	
2 May 2005 – 7 December 2007	Cyprus	Pound (£C)	0.585274	15%	2.1%	
7 December 2007 – 31 December 2007	Cyprus	Pound (£C)	0.585274	15%	0%	
2 May 2005 – 31 December 2007	Malta	Lira (Lm)	0.4293	15%	0%	The lira had been pegged to the euro since joining ERM II. Only two exceptions exist: 2005-05-02 (ECB rate: 1 EUR = 0.4288 MTL) and 2005-08-15 (ECB rate: 1 EUR = 0.4292 MTL).
28 November 2005 – 16 March 2007	Slovakia	Koruna (Sk.)	38.455	15%	12%	
17 March 2007 – 27 May 2008	Slovakia	Koruna (Sk.)	35.4424	15%	12%	
28 May 2008 – 31 December 2008	Slovakia	Koruna (Sk.)	30.126	15%	1.9%	
28 June 2004 – 31 December 2010	Estonia	Kroon (kr.)	15.6466	15%	0%	The kroon had been pegged to the D–Mark since its re-introduction on 20 June 1992, and then to the euro.
2 May 2005 – 31 December 2013	Latvia	Lats (Ls.)	0.7028	15%	1%	Latvia had a fixed exchange-rate system arrangement whose anchor switched from the SDR to the euro on 1 January 2005.
28 June 2004 – 31 December 2014	Lithuania	Litas (Lt.)	3.4528	15%	0%	The litas was pegged to the US dollar until 2 February 2002, when it switched to a euro peg.
10 July 2020 – 31 December 2022	Croatia	Kuna (kn.)	7.53450	15%	0%	
10 July 2020 – 31 December 2025	Bulgaria	Lev (лв.)	1.95583	15%	0%	A currency board arrangement was established in July 1997 to stabilize the economy, which anchored the Bulgarian lev by a fixed exchange rate to the Deutsche Mark and switched to the euro upon its inception.

== See also ==
- Euro convergence criteria
- List of acronyms associated with the eurozone crisis
