= 100 euro note =

Euro banknote

One hundred euro
- Country: Eurozone (mainly) and other countries
- Value: 100 euro
- Width: 147 mm
- Height: 82 (1st series); 77 (Europa series) mm
- Security features: A hologram patch with perforations, a EURion constellation, watermarks, microprinting, ultraviolet ink, raised printing, a security thread, matted surface, see-through number, colour-changing ink, barcodes and a serial number
- Material used: Cotton fibre
- Years of printing: 1999–2018 (1st series); Since 2018 (Europa series)

Obverse
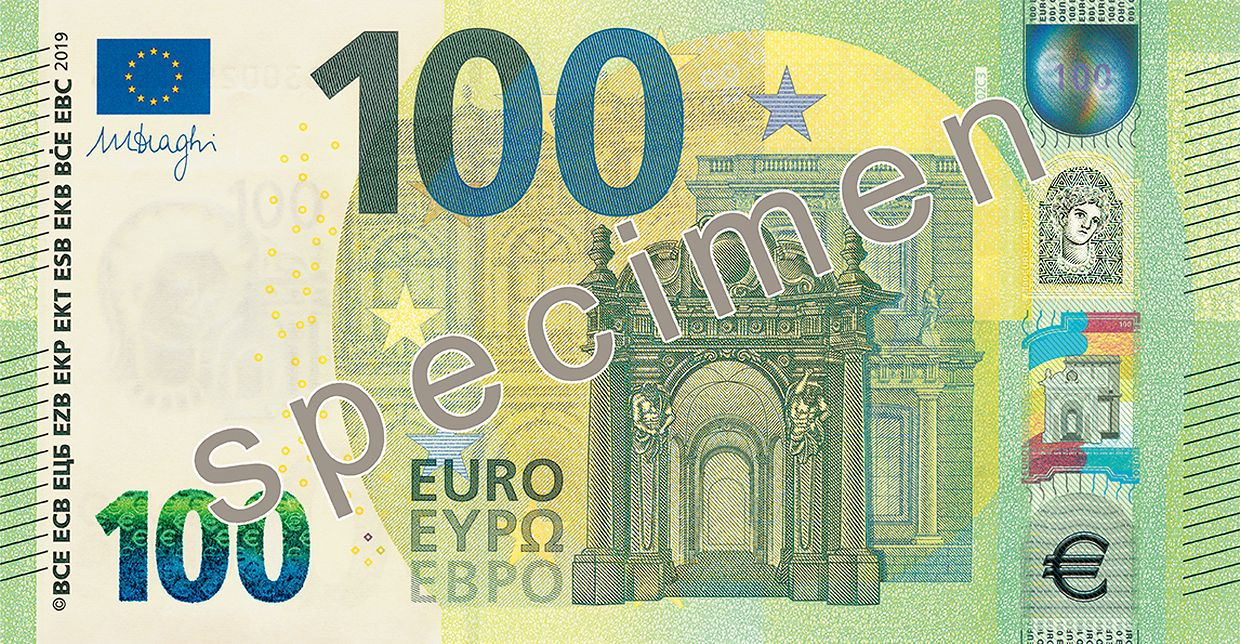
- Design: Window in the baroque and rococo style.
- Designer: Robert Kalina (1st series); Reinhold Gerstetter (Europa series)
- Design date: 3 December 1996 (1st series); 17 September 2018 (Europa series)

Reverse
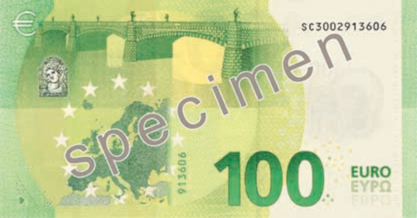
- Design: Bridge in the baroque and rococo style and map of Europe.
- Designer: Robert Kalina (1st series); Reinhold Gerstetter (Europa series)
- Design date: 3 December 1996 (1st series); 17 September 2018 (Europa series)

The one-hundred-euro note (€100) is one of the higher value euro banknotes and has been used since the introduction of the euro (in its cash form) in 2002.

The note is the official currency of 21 of the 27 member states of the European Union, which are part of the Eurozone. The 21 Eurozone members are: Austria, Belgium, Bulgaria, Croatia, Cyprus, Estonia, Finland, France, Germany, Greece, Ireland, Italy, Latvia, Lithuania, Luxembourg, Malta, the Netherlands, Portugal, Slovakia, Slovenia, and Spain.

A number of non-EU member states, namely Andorra, Monaco, San Marino, and Vatican City have formal agreements with the EU to use the euro as their official currency and issue their own coins. In addition, Kosovo and Montenegro have adopted the euro unilaterally.

The countries that use the euro have a total population of about 350 million people. In April 2026, there was an estimated 4,305,000,000 hundred euro banknotes in circulation in the eurozone. The note is the third most widely circulated denomination, accounting for 13.3% of the total banknotes.

The design of the Europa series 100 euro banknote was revealed on 17 September 2018 and launched on 28 May 2019.

== History ==
100 euro note of the 2002-2019 series

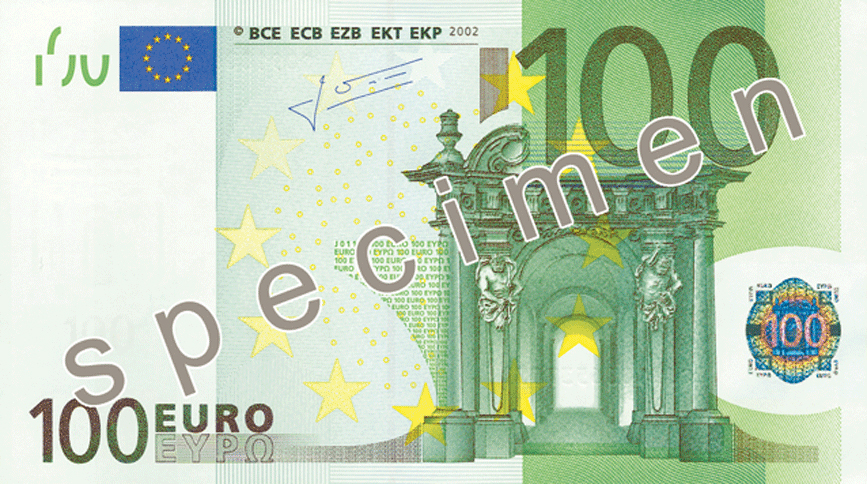
Obverse

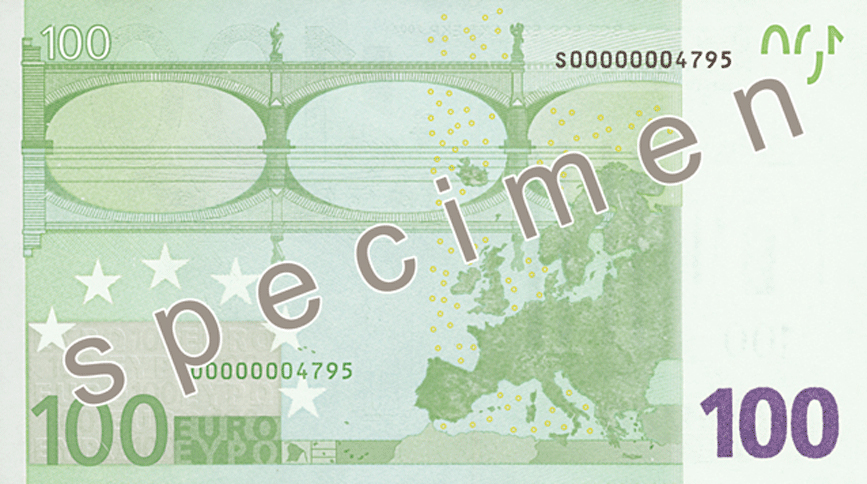
Reverse

The euro was implemented on 1 January 1999, when it became the currency of over 300 million people in Europe. For the first three years of its existence it was an invisible currency, only used in accountancy. euro cash was not introduced until 1 January 2002, when it replaced the national banknotes and coins of the countries in eurozone 12, such as the French franc and the Spanish peseta.

Slovenia joined the eurozone on 1 January 2007, Cyprus and Malta on 1 January 2008, Slovakia on 1 January 2009, Estonia on 1 January 2011, Latvia on 1 January 2014, Lithuania on 1 January 2015 Croatia on 1 January 2023. and Bulgaria on 1 January 2026.

=== The changeover period ===
The changeover period during which the former currencies' notes and coins were exchanged for those of the euro lasted about two months, going from 1 January 2002 until 28 February 2002. The official date on which the national currencies ceased to be legal tender varied from member state to member state. The earliest date was in Germany, where the mark officially ceased to be legal tender on 31 December 2001, though the exchange period lasted for two months more. Even after the old currencies ceased to be legal tender, they continued to be accepted by national central banks for periods ranging from ten years to forever.

=== Changes ===
Notes printed before November 2003 bear the signature of the first President of the European Central Bank, Wim Duisenberg, who was replaced on 1 November 2003 by Jean-Claude Trichet, whose signature appears on issues from November 2003 to March 2012. Notes issued from March 2012 to July 2020 bear the signature of the third President, Mario Draghi. Notes issued since July 2020 bear the signature of the fourth President, Christine Lagarde.

Until May 2013 there was only one series of euro notes, however a new series, similar to the first one, was planned to be released. The bank notes would be replaced in ascending order. Therefore, the first new note was the five-euro note that has been in circulation since 2 May 2013. Its new design was made public on 10 January 2013 in the Archaeological Museum of Frankfurt (Germany). While broadly similar to the previous notes, minor design changes include an updated map and a hologram of Europa. Moreover, the new notes reflect the expansion of the European Union; the previous issues do not include the members Cyprus and Malta (Cyprus is off the map to the east and Malta was too small to be depicted). It would be the first time in which the Bulgarian Cyrillic alphabet would be used on the banknotes as a result of Bulgaria joining the European Union in 2007. Therefore, the new series of Euro banknotes would include "ЕВРО", which is the Bulgarian spelling for EURO as well as the abbreviation "ЕЦБ" (short for Европейска централна банка in Bulgarian).

The design of the Europa series 100 euro banknote was revealed on 17 September 2018 and launched on 28 May 2019. Banknotes from the first series are legal tender and will always retain their value. They will continue to circulate alongside the Europa series until the remaining stocks have been used up.

A third series of banknotes, with an entirely new design, is due to be issued by the ECB starting in the late 2020s. Two themes for the new design, "European culture" and "Rivers and birds" were presented in November 2023, with the motifs chosen for each theme and denomination and theme being presented in January 2025. If the former theme is chosen, 100 euro notes will depict the Italian polymath Leonardo da Vinci on the obverse, and a group of adults and children admiring street art on the reverse. If the latter theme is chosen, they will depict an avocet flying over a mud flat on the obverse, and the seat of the European Council and Council of the European Union on the reverse.

== Design ==
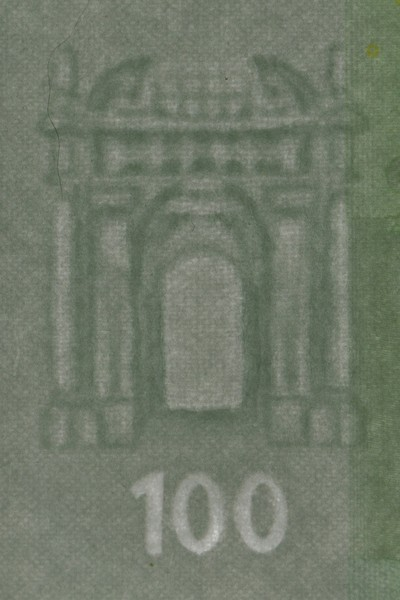
The watermark on the 100 euro note

The one hundred euro note measures at 147 millimetres (5.8 in) × 82 millimetres (3.2 in) and has a green colour scheme. All bank notes depict bridges and arches/doorways in a different historical European style; the hundred euro note shows the baroque and rococo style (17th and 18th centuries). Although Robert Kalina's original designs were intended to show real monuments, for political reasons the bridge and art are merely hypothetical examples of the architectural era.

Like all euro notes, it contains the denomination, the EU flag, the signature of the president of the ECB and the initials of said bank in different EU languages, a map of Europe, a depiction of EU territories overseas, the stars from the EU flag and twelve security features as listed below.

=== Security features (first series) ===
100-euro banknote under fluorescent light (UV-A)

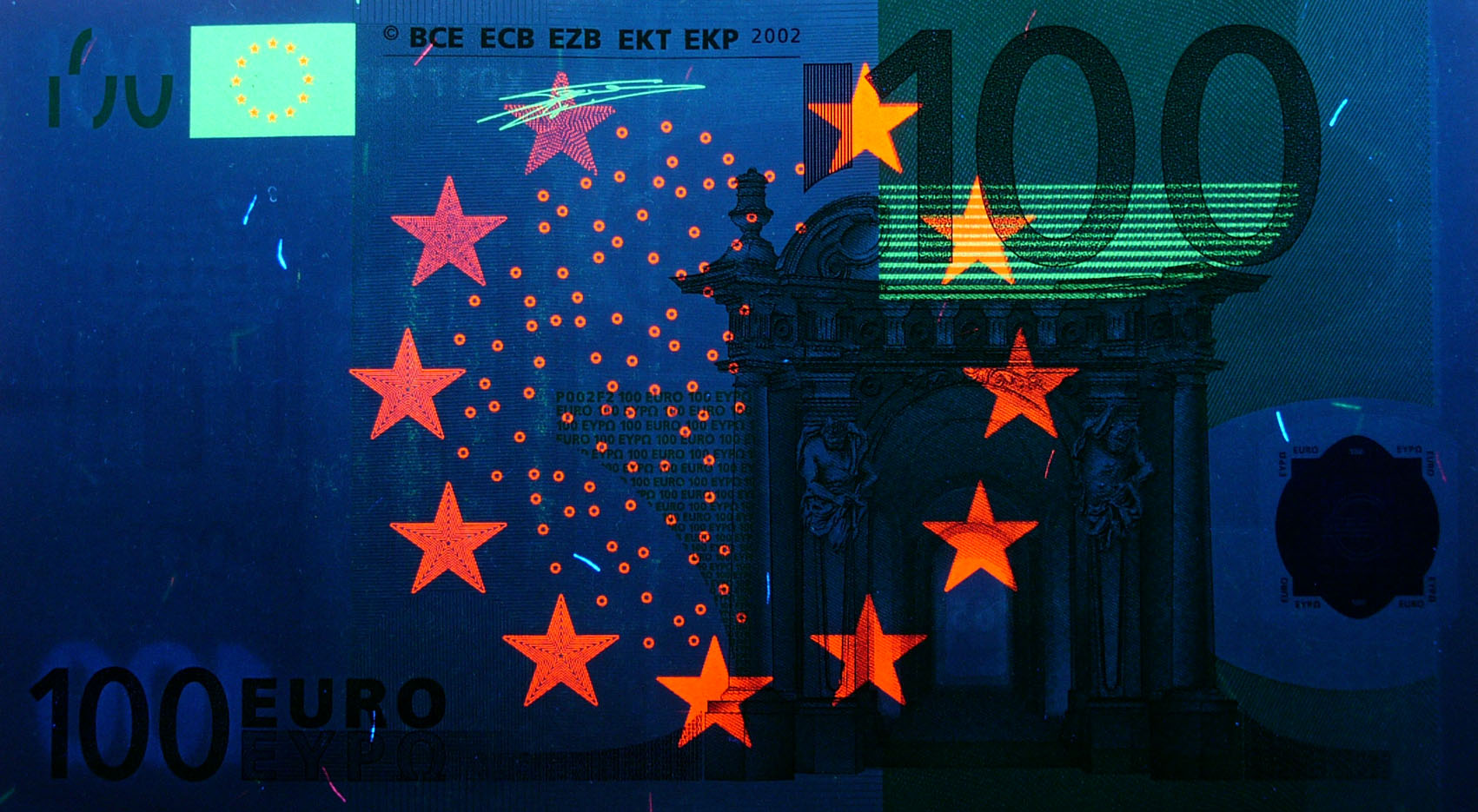
Obverse

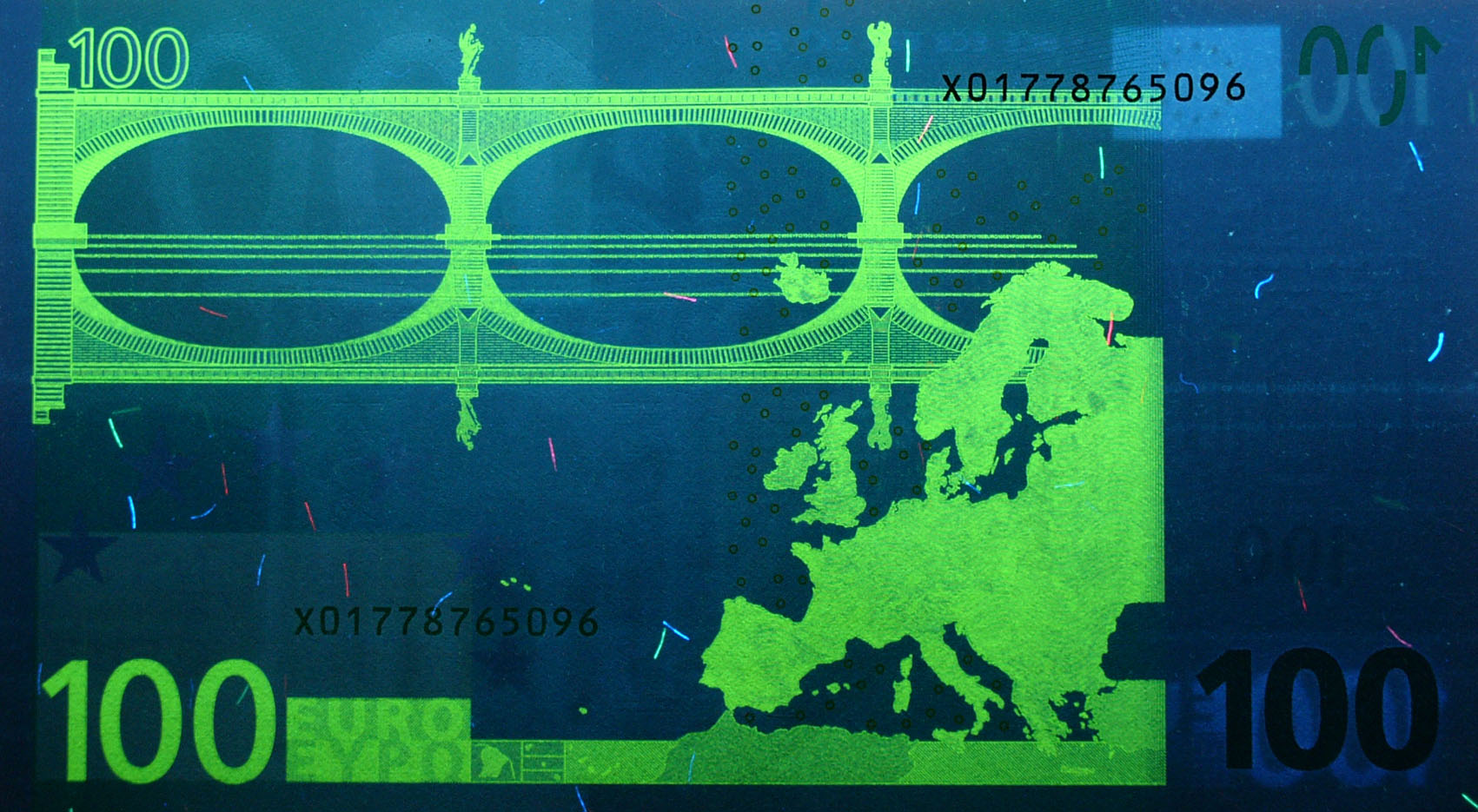
Reverse

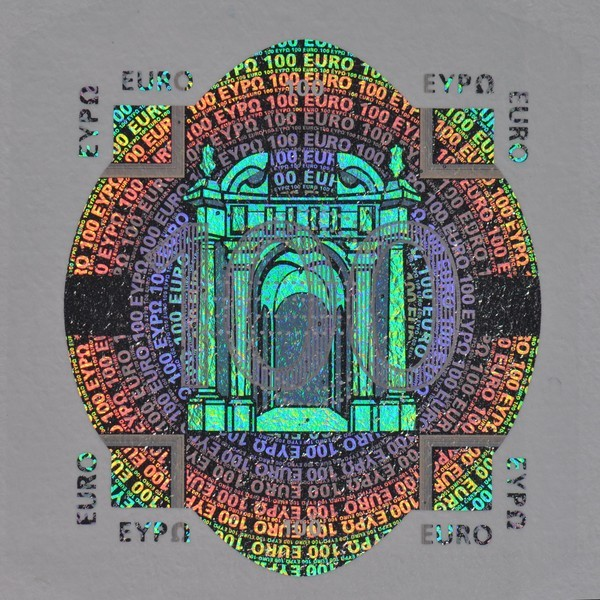
The hologram on the 100 euro note

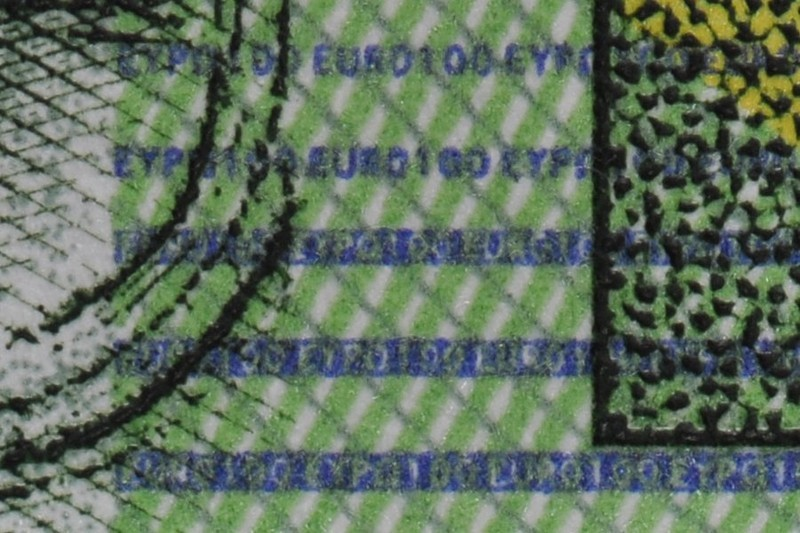
Microprinting on the 100 euro note

The hundred euro note is protected by:

- Colour changing ink used on the numeral located on the back of the note, that appears to change colour from purple to brown, when the note is tilted.
- A see through number printed in the top corner of the note, on both sides, appear combine perfectly to form the value numeral when held against the light.
- A hologram, used on the note which appears to see the hologram image change between the value and a window or doorway, but in the background, it appears to be rainbow-coloured concentric circles of micro-letters moving from the centre to the edges of the patch.
- A EURion constellation; the EURion constellation is a pattern of symbols found on a number of banknote designs worldwide since about 1996. It is added to help software detect the presence of a banknote in a digital image.
- Watermarks, which appear when held up to the light.
- Raised printing in the main image, the lettering and the value numerals on the front of the banknotes will be raised.
- Ultraviolet ink; the paper itself does not glow, fibres embedded in the paper do appear, and be coloured red, blue and green, the EU flag is green and has orange stars, the ECB President's, currently Mario Draghi's, signature turns green, the large stars and small circles on the front glow and the European map, a bridge and the value numeral on the back appear in yellow.
- Microprinting, on various areas of the banknotes there is microprinting, for example, inside the "ΕΥΡΩ" (EURO in Greek characters) on the front. The micro-text is sharp, but not blurred.
- A security thread, embedded in the banknote paper. The thread will appear as a dark stripe when held up to the light. The word "EURO" and the value is embedded in tiny letters on the thread.
- Perforations in the hologram which will form the euro symbol. There are also small numbers showing the value.
- A matted surface; the note paper is made out of pure cotton, which feels crisp and firm, but not limp or waxy.
- Barcodes,
- A serial number.

=== Security features (Europa series) ===
- Watermark: When the note is held under a normal light source, a portrait of Europa and an electrotype denomination appear on either side.
- Portrait Hologram: When the note is tilted, the silver-coloured holographic stripe reveals the portrait of Europa (the same one as in the watermark). The stripe also reveals a window and the value of the banknote.
- Emerald Number: When the note is tilted, the number on the note displays an effect of light that moves up and down. The number also changes colour from emerald green to deep blue.
- Glossy stripe: When the note is tilted, a glossy stripe, situated at the back of the note, showing the value numeral and the euro symbol appears golden or nearly invisible, depending on viewing angle.
- Raised Printing: On the front of the note, there is a series of short raised lines on the left and right edges. The main edge, the lettering and the large value numeral also feel thicker.
- Security Thread: When the note is held against the light, the security thread appears as a dark line. The Euro symbol (€) and the value of the banknote can be seen in tiny white lettering in the thread.
- Portrait Window: When the note is held against the light, the window in the silvery stripe becomes transparent and the portrait of Europa can be seen on both sides of the note.
- Microprint: Tiny letters which can be read with a magnifying glass. The letters should be sharp, not blurred.
- Ultraviolet ink: Some parts of the banknote shine when under UV or UV-C light. These are the stars in the flag, the small circles, the large stars and several other areas on the front. On the back, a quarter of a circle in the centre as well as several other areas glow green. The horizontal serial number and a stripe appear in red.
- Infrared light: Under infrared light, the emerald number, the right side of the main image and the silvery stripe are visible on the obverse of the banknote, while on the reverse, only the denomination and the horizontal serial number are visible.

== Circulation ==
The European Central Bank closely monitors the circulation and stock of the euro coins and banknotes. It is a task of the Eurosystem to ensure an efficient and smooth supply of euro notes and to maintain their integrity throughout the euro area.

In December 2025, there were 4,270,776,517 hundred euro banknotes in circulation around the euro area, with a total value of €427,077,651,700.

This is a net number, i.e. the number of banknotes issued by the Eurosystem central banks, without further distinction as to who is holding the currency issued, thus also including the stocks held by credit institutions.

Besides the date of the introduction of the first set to January 2002, the publication of figures is more significant through the maximum number of banknotes raised each year. The number is higher the end of the year.

The figures are as follows:

Date	Banknotes	€ Value	Date	Banknotes	€ Value
January 2002	364,031,436	36,403,143,600	December 2010	1,551,066,921	155,106,692,100
December 2002	673,170,705	67,317,070,500	December 2011	1,649,945,591	164,994,559,100
December 2003	809,767,028	80,976,702,800	December 2012	1,706,141,626	170,614,162,600
December 2004	919,398,800	91,939,880,000	December 2013	1,850,015,381	185,001,538,100
December 2005	1,018,442,381	101,844,238,100	December 2014	2,016,165,717	201,616,571,700
December 2006	1,116,412,654	111,641,265,400	December 2015	2,144,782,443	214,478,244,300
December 2007	1,209,329,905	120,932,990,500	December 2016	2,432,578,136	243,257,813,600
December 2008	1,381,014,947	138,101,494,700	December 2017	2,623,675,137	262,367,513,700
December 2009	1,471,861,127	147,186,112,700	December 2018	2,804,486,391	280,448,639,100

On 28 May 2019, a new 'Europe' series was issued.

The first series of notes were issued in conjunction with those for a few weeks in the series 'Europe' until existing stocks are exhausted, then gradually withdrawn from circulation. Both series thus run parallel but the proportion tends inevitably to a sharp decrease in the first series.

Date	Banknotes	€ Value	Series '1' remainder	€ Value	Proportion
December 2019	3,051,003,315	305,100,331,500	2,519,442,151	251,944,215,100	82.6%
December 2020	3,366,199,769	336,619,976,900	2,260,239,741	226,023,974,100	67.1%
December 2021	3,668,655,199	366,865,519,900	2,056,740,830	205,674,083,000	56.1%
December 2022	3,928,099,612	392,809,961,200	1,813,369,801	181,336,980,100	46.2%
December 2023	3,949,538,638	394,953,863,800	1,592,787,151	159,278,715,100	40.3%
December 2024	4,076,758,097	407,675,809,700	1,424,981,853	142,498,185,300	35.0%
December 2025	4,270,776,517	427,077,651,700	1,275,012,903	127,501,290,300	29.9%

The latest figures provided by the ECB are the following:

Date	Banknotes	€ Value	Series '1' remainder	€ Value	Proportion
April 2026	4,305,535,290	430,553,529,000	1,231,504,714	123,150,471,400	28.6%

== Legal information ==
Legally, both the European Central Bank and the central banks of the eurozone countries have the right to issue the 7 different euro banknotes. In practice, only the national central banks of the zone physically issue and withdraw euro banknotes. The European Central Bank does not have a cash office and is not involved in any cash operations.

== Tracking ==
There are several communities of people at European level, most of which is EuroBillTracker, that, as a hobby, it keeps track of the euro banknotes that pass through their hands, to keep track and know where they travel or have travelled. The aim is to record as many notes as possible in order to know details about its spread, like from where and to where they travel in general, follow it up, like where a ticket has been seen in particular, and generate statistics and rankings, for example, in which countries there are more tickets. EuroBillTracker has registered over 176 million notes as of May 2018, worth more than €3.257 billion.
