= Enlargement of the eurozone =

Adoption of the euro by more countries

Eurozone
EU member in ERM II, with an opt-out
EU members not in ERM II, but committed to join the eurozone after meeting the convergence criteria
Non–EU members using the euro with a monetary agreement
Non–EU members using the euro unilaterally

The enlargement of the eurozone is an ongoing process within the European Union (EU). All member states of the European Union, except Denmark which negotiated an opt-out from the provisions, are obliged to adopt the euro as their sole currency once they meet the criteria, which include: complying with the debt and deficit criteria outlined by the Stability and Growth Pact, keeping inflation and long-term governmental interest rates below certain reference values, stabilising their currency's exchange rate versus the euro by participating in the European Exchange Rate Mechanism (ERM II), and ensuring that their national laws comply with the ECB statute, ESCB statute and articles 130+131 of the Treaty on the Functioning of the European Union. The obligation for EU member states to adopt the euro was first outlined by article 109.1j of the Maastricht Treaty of 1992, which became binding on all new member states by the terms of their treaties of accession.

As of 2026, there are 21 EU member states in the eurozone, of which the first 11 (Austria, Belgium, Finland, France, Germany, Ireland, Italy, Luxembourg, the Netherlands, Portugal, and Spain) introduced the euro on 1 January 1999 when it was electronic only. Greece joined 1 January 2001, one year before the physical euro coins and notes replaced the old national currencies in the eurozone. Subsequently, the following nine countries also joined the eurozone on 1 January in the mentioned year: Slovenia (2007), Cyprus (2008), Malta (2008), Slovakia (2009), Estonia (2011), Latvia (2014), Lithuania (2015), Croatia (2023), and Bulgaria (2026).

Five remaining states are bound by the EU treaties to introduce the euro once they fulfil certain economic criteria known as the convergence criteria — the Czech Republic, Hungary, Poland, Romania, and Sweden. Since the convergence criteria requires participation in ERM II for a minimum of two years, and non-eurozone member states are responsible for deciding when to join ERM II, they can delay their compliance with the criteria by not joining ERM II. A 2022 study, based on optimum currency area theory, finds that these non-euro area members fit the euro area as well as the core euro area countries.

All non-eurozone member states are assessed for compliance with the convergence criteria by the ECB and the European Commission biennially, with the most recent report published in June 2024. Member states can also request that their compliance be evaluated outside this two-year cycle as of any month of their choosing, as compliance is subject to change throughout the year. Denmark has a treaty opt-out from the obligation to join the eurozone even if it complies with all criteria; historically this also applied to the United Kingdom, until it left the EU on 31 January 2020.

ECB began a two-year preparation phase for the creation of a new digital euro on 1 November 2023, which has been proposed – but not yet decided – to be introduced as an additional digital payment method coexisting with the currently available four types of euro transactions: cash, payment card, bank account, and other digital payments. If the digital euro is adopted, it will be accessible and accepted as a new extra payment method for citizens in the eurozone, and also available for citizens of the European microstates subject to approval of revised monetary agreements. Any non‑eurozone member state will per article 18 of the proposed Council regulation also be granted the option to adopt the digital euro as a payment method for their citizens – without entering the eurozone, subject to the signing of a digital euro adoption agreement between the ECB and the national central bank of that member state.

== Accession procedure ==
All EU members which have joined the bloc since the signing of the Maastricht Treaty in 1992 are legally obliged to adopt the euro once they meet the criteria, since the terms of their accession treaties make the provisions on the euro binding on them. In order for a state to formally join the eurozone, enabling them to mint euro coins and get a seat at the European Central Bank (ECB) and the Eurogroup, a country must be a member of the European Union and comply with five convergence criteria, which were initially defined by the Maastricht Treaty in 1992. These criteria include: complying with the debt and deficit criteria outlined by the Stability and Growth Pact, keeping inflation and long-term governmental interest rates below reference values, and stabilising their currency's exchange rate versus the euro. Generally, it is expected that the last point will be demonstrated by two consecutive years of participation in the European Exchange Rate Mechanism (ERM II), though according to the Commission "exchange rate stability during a period of non-participation before entering ERM II can be taken into account." The country must also ensure that their national laws are compliant with the ECB statute, ESCB statute and articles 130+131 of the Treaty on the Functioning of the European Union.

Since the convergence criteria require participation in the ERM, and non-eurozone member states are responsible for deciding when to join ERM, they can ultimately control when they adopt the euro by staying outside the ERM and thus deliberately failing to meet the convergence criteria until they wish to. In some non-eurozone member states without an opt-out, there has been discussion about holding referendums on approving their euro adoption. Of the 16 states which have acceded to EU since 1992, the only state to have staged a euro referendum to date is Sweden, which in 2003 rejected its government's proposal to adopt the euro in 2006.

=== Convergence criteria ===
The convergence progress for the newly acceded EU member states is supported and evaluated by the yearly submission of the "Convergence programme" under the Stability and Growth Pact. As a general rule, the majority of economic experts recommend for newly accessed EU member states with a forecasted era of catching up and a past record of "macroeconomic imbalance" or "financial instability", that these countries first use some years to address these issues and ensure "stable convergence", before taking the next step to join the ERM II, and as the final step (when complying with all convergence criteria) ultimately adopt the euro. In practical terms, any non-euro EU member state can become an ERM II member whenever they want, as this mechanism does not define any criteria to comply with. Economists however consider it to be more desirable for "unstable countries" to maintain their flexibility of having a floating currency, rather than getting an inflexible and partly fixed currency as an ERM II member. Only at the time of being considered fully "stable", the member states will be encouraged to enter into ERM II, in which they need to stay for a minimum of two years without presence of "severe tensions" for their currency, while at the same time also ensuring compliance with the other four convergence criteria, before finally being approved to adopt the euro.

Convergence criteria (as of the compliance assessment conducted by the ECB in their June 2026 Report)
| Country | HICP inflation rate (Note: The rate of change of the 12-month average HICP over the prior 12-month average must be no more than 1.5% larger than the unweighted arithmetic average of the similar HICP inflation rates in the 3 EU member states with the lowest HICP inflation. If any of these 3 states have a HICP rate significantly below the similarly averaged HICP rate for the eurozone (which according to ECB practice means more than 2% below), and if this low HICP rate has been primarily caused by exceptional circumstances (i.e. severe wage cuts or a strong recession), then such a state is not included in the calculation of the reference value and is replaced by the EU state with the fourth lowest HICP rate.) | Excessive deficit procedure | | Exchange rate | | Long-term interest rate (Note: The arithmetic average of the annual yield of 10-year government bonds as of the end of the past 12 months must be no more than 2.0% larger than the unweighted arithmetic average of the bond yields in the 3 EU member states with the lowest HICP inflation. If any of these states have bond yields which are significantly larger than the similarly averaged yield for the eurozone (which according to previous ECB reports means more than 2% above) and at the same time does not have complete funding access to financial markets (which is the case for as long as a government receives bailout funds), then such a state is not to be included in the calculation of the reference value.) | Compatibility of legislation |
| Country | HICP inflation rate | Budget deficit to GDP | Debt-to-GDP ratio | ERM II member | Change in rate (Note: The change in the annual average exchange rate against the euro.) | Long-term interest rate | Compatibility of legislation |
| Reference values (Note: Reference values from the Convergence Report of June 2026.) | Max. 2.7% (Note: Cyprus, Denmark, and France were the reference states.) (as of May 2026) | None open (as of 17 June 2026) | | Min. 2 years (as of 17 June 2026) | Max. ±15% (Note: The maximum allowed change in rate is ± 2.25% for Denmark.) (for 2025) | Max. 5.1% (as of May 2026) | Compliant (as of 25 March 2026) |
| Reference values | Max. 2.7% (as of May 2026) | Max. 3.0% (FY 2025) | Max. 60% (FY 2025) | Min. 2 years (as of 17 June 2026) | Max. ±15% (for 2025) | Max. 5.1% (as of May 2026) | Compliant (as of 25 March 2026) |
|---|---|---|---|---|---|---|---|
| Czech Republic | 1.9% | None | | No | 1.7% | 4.5% | No |
| Czech Republic | 1.9% | 2.1% | 44.3% | No | 1.7% | 4.5% | No |
| Denmark | 1.6% | None | | 27 years, 5 months | −0.6% | 2.6% | Not assessed |
| Denmark | 1.6% | −2.9% (surplus) | 27.9% | 27 years, 5 months | −0.6% | 2.6% | Not assessed |
| Hungary | 3.3% | Open | | No | −0.6% | 6.7% | No |
| Hungary | 3.3% | 4.7% | 74.6% | No | −0.6% | 6.7% | No |
| Poland | 2.9% | Open | | No | 1.5% | 5.4% | No |
| Poland | 2.9% | 7.3% | 59.7% | No | 1.5% | 5.4% | No |
| Romania | 8.4% | Open | | No | −1.4% | 6.7% | No |
| Romania | 8.4% | 7.9% | 59.3% | No | −1.4% | 6.7% | No |
| Sweden | 2.2% | None | | No | 3.2% | 2.6% | No |
| Sweden | 2.2% | 1.3% | 35.1% | No | 3.2% | 2.6% | No |

Criterion fulfilled
Criterion potentially fulfilled: If the budget deficit exceeds the 3% limit, but is "close" to this value (the European Commission has deemed 3.5% to be close by in the past), then the criteria can still potentially be fulfilled if either the deficits in the previous two years are significantly declining towards the 3% limit, or if the excessive deficit is the result of exceptional circumstances which are temporary in nature (i.e. one-off expenditures triggered by a significant economic downturn, or by the implementation of economic reforms that are expected to deliver a significant positive impact on the government's future fiscal budgets). However, even if such "special circumstances" are found to exist, additional criteria must also be met to comply with the fiscal budget criterion. Additionally, if the debt-to-GDP ratio exceeds 60% but is "sufficiently diminishing and approaching the reference value at a satisfactory pace" it can be deemed to be in compliance.
Criterion not fulfilled

Notes

Reference values for the HICP criteria and interest rate criteria

The compliance check above was conducted in June 2014, with the HICP and interest rate reference values specifically applying for the last assessment month with available data (April 2014). As reference values for HICP and interest rates are subject for monthly changes, any EU member state with a euro derogation has the right to ask for a renewed compliance check at any time during the year. For this potential extra assessment, the table below feature Eurostat's monthly publication of values being used in the calculation process to determine the reference value (upper limit) for HICP inflation and long-term interest rates, where a certain fixed buffer value is added to the moving unweighted arithmetic average of the three EU Member States with the lowest HICP inflation rates (ignoring states classified as "outliers").

The black values in the table are sourced by the officially published convergence reports, while the lime-green values are only qualified estimates, not confirmed by any official convergence report but sourced by monthly estimation reports published by the Polish Ministry of Finance. The reason why the lime-green values are only estimates is that the "outlier" selection (ignoring certain states from the reference value calculation) besides depending on a quantitative assessment also depends on a more complicated overall qualitative assessment, and hence it can not be predicted with absolute certainty which of the states the commission will deem to be outliers. So any selection of outliers by the lime-green data lines shall only be regarded as qualified estimates, which potentially could be different from those outliers which the commission would have selected if they had published a specific report at the concerned point of time. (Note: A particular high uncertainty exists for the Polish selection of HICP outliers, as it is only based upon evaluation of the first part of the official outlier criteria. The official outlier criteria require both (1) The HICP rate to be significantly below the eurozone average and (2) This "significant below" HICP to stem from adverse price developments from exceptional factors (i.e. severe enforced wage cuts, exceptional developments in energy/food/currency markets, or a strong recession). Precedent assessment cases proof the second part of the outlier criteria also needs to be met, i.e. Finland had a HICP criteria value being 1.7% below eurozone average in August 2004 without being classified to be "HICP outlier" by the European Commission, and Sweden likewise had a HICP criteria value being 1.4% below eurozone average in April 2013 without being classified to be "HICP outlier" by the European Commission. In addition to the uncertainty related to the fact that the Polish source only evaluate the first requirement, there is also uncertainty related to the Polish quantification of what "significant below" means. For all assessment months until March 2014, the Polish source had adopted the assumption (based on precedent assessment cases) that "all states with HICP criteria values minimum 1.8% below eurozone average" should be classified to be "HICP outliers". Based on the 2014 EC Convergence report's classification of Cyprus with a HICP criteria value only 1.4% below eurozone average as a "HICP outlier", the Polish source accordingly also adjusted their "HICP outlier selection criteria" from April 2014 onwards, so that it now automatically classify "all states with HICP criteria values minimum 1.4% below eurozone average" as "HICP outliers". The European Commission never quantified what "significant below" means, which is why the Polish source attempts to quantify it based on precedent assessment cases, but this also means it is uncertain whether or not the currently assumed 1.4% limit is correct. It could perhaps just as well be 1.0%.)

The national fiscal accounts for the previous full calendar year are released each year in April (next time 24 April 2019). As the compliance check for both the debt and deficit criteria always awaits this release in a new calendar year, the first possible month to request a compliance check will be April, which would result in a data check for the HICP and interest rates during the reference year from 1 April to 31 March. Any EU member state may also ask the European Commission to conduct a compliance check, at any point of time during the remainder of the year, with HICP and interest rates always checked for the past 12 months – while debt and deficit compliance always will be checked for the three-year period encompassing the last completed full calendar year and the two subsequent forecast years. As of 10 August 2015, none of the remaining euro derogation states without an opt-out had entered ERM II, which makes it highly unlikely that any of them will request that the European Commission conduct an extraordinary compliance check ahead of the publication of the next regular convergence report scheduled June 2016.

=== Additional requirements ===
During the 2008 financial crisis, Eurozone governments have sought to apply additional requirements on acceding countries. Bulgaria, initially aiming to join the Banking union of the European Union after its ERM accession agreed to enter into closer cooperation with it simultaneously to joining ERM II, requiring its banks to first undergo stress tests. Bulgaria also agreed to reinforce supervision of the non-bank financial sector and fully implement EU anti money-laundering rules. While the reforms from the Cooperation and Verification Mechanism (which applies only to Bulgaria and Romania) were also expected, leaving the CVM is not a precondition.

=== Changeover plan ===
Each country aspiring to adopt the euro has been requested by the European Commission to develop a "strategy for criteria compliance" and "national euro changeover plan". In the "changeover plan", the country can select from between three scenarios for euro adoption:

1. Madrid scenario (with a transition period between euro adoption day and the physical circulation of euro)
2. Big-bang scenario (euro adoption day coincides with the first day of circulating euro)
3. Big-bang scenario with phaseout (same as the second scenario, but with a transitional period for legal documents like contracts to be denoted in euro)

The second scenario is recommended for candidate countries, while the third is only advised if at a late stage in the preparational process they experience technical difficulties (i.e. with IT systems), which would make an extended transitional period for the phasing out of the old currency at the legal level a necessity. The European Commission has published a handbook detailing how states should prepare for the changeover. It recommends that a national steering committee is established at a very early stage of the state's preparation process, with the task to outline detailed plans for the following five actions:

1. Prepare the public with an information campaign and dual price display.
2. Prepare the public sector's introduction at the legal level.
3. Prepare the private sector's introduction at the legal level.
4. Prepare the vending machine industry so that they can deliver adjusted and quality tested vending machines.
5. Frontload banks as well as public and private retail sectors several months (no earlier than 4 months) ahead of the euro adoption day, with their needed supply of euro coins and notes.

The table below summarizes each candidate country's national plan for euro adoption and currency changeover. All member states are recommended to codify and pass a "Euro Act" featuring the changeover and euro adoption decisions in accordance with the latest edition of their previously published "National Euro Changeover Plan", at least 6 months ahead of its euro adoption day.

| Country | Coordinating institution (founding date) | Changeover plan (latest edition) | Scenario for adoption | Dual circulation period | Free exchange of coins and notes | Dual price display | Coin design |
|---|---|---|---|---|---|---|---|
| Czech Republic | National Coordination Group (February 2006) | Approved: April 2007 | Big-bang | 2 weeks | Banks: 6 months Central bank: 5 years | Start 1 month after Council approval of euro adoption, and lasts until 12 months after adoption | Not yet decided |
| Denmark | – | The plan from 2000 is no longer valid, and will be updated ahead of a second referendum | Madrid (as per the 2000 plan) | 4 weeks or 2 months (as per the 2000 plan) | Central bank: 30 years (as per the 2000 plan) | Start on the day of euro circulation, and last 4 weeks or 2 months (as per the 2000 plan) | A possible design was published prior to the referendum in 2000 |
| Hungary | National Euro Coordination Committee (September 2007) | Updated: December 2009 | Big-bang | Less than 1 month (not yet decided) | Central bank: 5 years | Start 1 day after Council approval of euro adoption, and lasts until 6 months after adoption | Not yet decided |
| Poland | National Coordination Committee for Euro Changeover (November 2009) | Approved: 2011 (updated plan in preparation) (Note: Cite from the 2014 Polish convergence report: Due to the significant reform agenda in the European Union and in the euro area, the current objective is to update the National Euro Changeover Plan with reference to the impact of those changes on Poland's euro adoption strategy. The date of completion of the document is conditional on the adoption of binding solutions on the EU forum concerning the key institutional changes, in particular, those referring to the Banking union of the European Union. The outcome of these changes determines the area of the necessary institutional and legal adjustments as well as the national balance of costs and benefits arising from introduction of the common currency. Cite from the 2015 Polish convergence report: Taking into account the scale of institutional changes in the European Union and the euro area, it was deemed proper to update the "National Euro Changeover Plan" as regards the consequences of these changes for the preparation strategy. The outcome of these changes determines the area of the necessary institutional and legal adjustments as well as the national balance of costs and benefits arising from introduction of the common currency. The date of completion of works on the update of the "Plan" depends on the completion of the main works on the institutional reform of the Economic and Monetary Union.) | – | – | – | – | Not yet decided |
| Romania | Inter-ministerial Committee for Changeover to the Euro (May 2011) | Approved: December 2018 | – | 11 months | – | – | Not yet decided |
| Sweden | – | – | – | – | – | – | Not yet decided |

=== Alternative proposals ===
The European microstates of Andorra, Monaco, San Marino, and the Vatican City are not covered by convergence criteria, but by special monetary agreements that allow them to issue their own euro coins. However, they have no input into the economic affairs of the euro. In 2009, the authors of a confidential International Monetary Fund (IMF) report suggested that due to the 2008 financial crisis, the EU Council should consider granting EU member states which are having difficulty complying with all five convergence criteria the option to "partially adopt" the euro, along the lines of the monetary agreements signed with the microstates outside the EU. These states would gain the right to adopt the euro and issue a national variant of euro coins, but would not get a seat in ECB or the Eurogroup until they met all the convergence criteria. However, the EU has not agreed to this alternative accession process.

== Historical enlargements ==
Historical currencies of the European Union
| Currency | Code | Rate | Fixed on | Yielded |
|---|---|---|---|---|
| Austrian schilling | ATS | 13.7603 | 31 December 1998 | 1 January 1999 |
| Belgian franc | BEF | 40.3399 | 31 December 1998 | 1 January 1999 |
| Dutch guilder | NLG | 2.20371 | 31 December 1998 | 1 January 1999 |
| Finnish markka | FIM | 5.94573 | 31 December 1998 | 1 January 1999 |
| French franc | FRF | 6.55957 | 31 December 1998 | 1 January 1999 |
| German mark | DEM | 1.95583 | 31 December 1998 | 1 January 1999 |
| Irish pound | IEP | 0.787564 | 31 December 1998 | 1 January 1999 |
| Italian lira | ITL | 1,936.27 | 31 December 1998 | 1 January 1999 |
| Luxembourg franc | LUF | 40.3399 | 31 December 1998 | 1 January 1999 |
| Portuguese escudo | PTE | 200.482 | 31 December 1998 | 1 January 1999 |
| Spanish peseta | ESP | 166.386 | 31 December 1998 | 1 January 1999 |
| Greek drachma | GRD | 340.750 | 19 June 2000 | 1 January 2001 |
| Slovenian tolar | SIT | 239.640 | 11 July 2006 | 1 January 2007 |
| Cypriot pound | CYP | 0.585274 | 10 July 2007 | 1 January 2008 |
| Maltese lira | MTL | 0.429300 | 10 July 2007 | 1 January 2008 |
| Slovak koruna | SKK | 30.1260 | 8 July 2008 | 1 January 2009 |
| Estonian kroon | EEK | 15.6466 | 13 July 2010 | 1 January 2011 |
| Latvian lats | LVL | 0.702804 | 9 July 2013 | 1 January 2014 |
| Lithuanian litas | LTL | 3.45280 | 23 July 2014 | 1 January 2015 |
| Croatian kuna | HRK | 7.53450 | 12 July 2022 | 1 January 2023 |
| Bulgarian lev | BGN | 1.95583 | 8 July 2025 | 1 January 2026 |

The eurozone was established with its first 11 member states on 1 January 1999. The first enlargement of the eurozone, to Greece, took place on 1 January 2001, one year before the euro physically entered into circulation. Along with the formal eurozone states, the euro also replaced currencies in four microstates, Kosovo, and Montenegro, all of whom used currencies replaced by the euro. The first enlargements after the euro entered into circulation were to states which joined the EU in 2004; namely Slovenia in 2007, Cyprus and Malta in 2008, Slovakia in 2009, Estonia in 2011, Latvia in 2014, and Lithuania in 2015. Croatia, which had joined the EU in 2013, adopted the euro on 1 January 2023; while Bulgaria, which had joined in 2007, adopted the euro on 1 January 2026. Denmark and Sweden held referendums on joining the eurozone, but voters voted against adopting the euro. Denmark has an opt-out written into its approval of the Maastricht Treaty granting the country four exemptions from EU harmonization; one of them was the right to keep its own currency. In Sweden, the referendum opposition to euro adoption led the government to postpone currency-area accession, despite the absence of an opt-out.

=== Exchange-rate regime for EU members ===
The chart below provides a full historical summary of exchange-rate regimes for EU members since the European Monetary System with its Exchange Rate Mechanism and the related new common currency ECU was born on 13 March 1979. The euro replaced the ECU 1:1 at the exchange rate markets, on 1 January 1999. During 1979–1999, the German mark functioned as a de facto anchor for the ECU, meaning there was only a minor difference between pegging a currency against ECU and pegging it against the German mark.

Sources: EC convergence reports 1996-2014, Italian lira, Spanish peseta, Portuguese escudo, Finnish markka, Greek drachma, Sterling

== Future enlargements ==
The 1992 Maastricht Treaty obliged EU member states to join the eurozone once they meet the convergence criteria. The only member state not covered by these provisions is Denmark (and formerly the United Kingdom before it withdrew from the EU), who when the euro was agreed negotiated a treaty opt-out from the requirement to join. All member states who joined the EU after 1992 have committed - as part of the terms of their Treaty of Accession to join the EU - to adopt the euro as soon as they meet the criteria.

EU member states which have not adopted the euro
| Country | Currency (Code) | Central rate per €1 | EU join date | ERM II join date | Government policy on euro adoption | Convergence criteria compliance (as of the most recent compliance assessment for each country) | Notes |
|---|---|---|---|---|---|---|---|
| Czech Republic | Koruna (CZK) | Free floating | 2004-05-01 | N/A | Not on government's agenda | Compliant with 3 out of 5 criteria | |
| Denmark | Krone (DKK) | 7.46038 | 1973-01-01 | 1999-01-01 | Not on government's agenda | Not assessed due to opt-out from eurozone membership | Rejected euro adoption by referendum in 2000 |
| Hungary | Forint (HUF) | Free floating | 2004-05-01 | N/A | Possible adoption in 2030 or 2031 | Not compliant with any of the 5 criteria | |
| Poland | Złoty (PLN) | Free floating | 2004-05-01 | N/A | Not on government's agenda | Not compliant with any of the 5 criteria | |
| Romania | Leu (RON) | Free floating | 2007-01-01 | N/A | Possible adoption in 2032 or 2035 | Not compliant with any of the 5 criteria | |
| Sweden | Krona (SEK) | Free floating | 1995-01-01 | N/A | Not on government's agenda | Compliant with 3 out of 5 criteria | Rejected euro adoption by referendum in 2003 (Note: Sweden is still obliged to adopt the euro under its Treaty of Accession once compliant with all convergence criteria, but it has chosen to deliberately fail to meet those criteria by not joining ERM II without prior approval in a referendum.) |

Eurozone participation European Union member states (special territories not shown) 21 in the eurozone 1 in ERM II, with an opt-out (Denmark) 5 not in ERM II, but committed to join the eurozone after meeting the convergence criteria (Czech Republic, Hungary, Poland, Romania, and Sweden) Non–EU member states 4 using the euro with a monetary agreement (Andorra, Monaco, San Marino, and Vatican City) 2 using the euro unilaterally (Kosovo and Montenegro)

=== Czech Republic ===
Following their accession to the EU in May 2004, the Czech Republic aimed to replace the koruna with the euro in 2010, however this was postponed indefinitely. The European sovereign-debt crisis further decreased the Czech Republic's interest in joining the eurozone. There were calls for a referendum before adopting the euro, with former Prime Minister Petr Nečas saying that the conditions had significantly changed since their accession treaty was ratified. President Miloš Zeman also supported a referendum, but did still advocate adoption of the euro. The popular opposition as well as support for the euro adoption remains constant: around 70% of people oppose the adoption, meanwhile 20% support it (the figures have not changed since 2010).

Adoption was supported under Prime Minister Bohuslav Sobotka, although he accepted a recommendation from the Czech National Bank to refrain from setting a specific target date. The government agreed that if it was re-elected in 2017 then it would agree a roadmap for adoption by 2020, however the election was lost to Andrej Babiš who had been against euro adoption in the near-term.

Babiš's successor Petr Fiala and his cabinet, formed after the 2021 legislative election, began its term by maintaining the predecessor cabinets' intention not to adopt the euro, calling the adoption "disadvantageous" for the Czechs. However, the position not to set a target date for euro adoption and not to apply for ERM-II membership was only supported by one of the five ruling cabinet parties (ODS), while all the other four parties supported to start a euro adoption process. Czech President Petr Pavel announced in his New Year's speech for 2024, that he supported the Czech Republic to take imminent concrete steps towards adopting the euro.

In February 2024, the Czech government appointed a commissioner for euro adoption, economist Petr Zahradnik, to oversee efforts to adopt the euro and communicate the beneficiary prospects to the Czech public. Prime Minister Petr Fiala (ODS) however immediately called a five-party coalition summit in response, as his party still disagreed with the idea to start preparing for ERM-II membership now, and hoped the government instead could negotiate and reach a new joint position on this issue - more closely aligned with the viewpoint of ODS. The Czech minister for European affairs, Martin Dvořák, at the other side proposed a timeline of joining ERM-II in 2024/2025 and adopting the euro on 1 January 2030. The coalition summit resulted in a new common government policy on the issue, first cancelling the post of the just appointed euro adoption commissioner, and then instead ordering an expert panel advice by October 2024 on the merits of joining ERM-II. The government will now await the expert panel report, before taking any further decisions about ERM-II membership or euro adoption.

An April 2026 Eurobarometer poll, showed that 42% of Czechs favour adoption of the euro in the Czech Republic, while 58% were against. Polls conducted by Czech public media and Czech Academy of Sciences usually show even stronger opposition to the euro adoption, around 72% in 2023 and 2024.

=== Denmark ===
Denmark has pegged its krone to the euro at €1 = DKK 7.46038 ± 2.25% through the ERM II since it replaced the original ERM on 1 January 1999. During negotiations of the Maastricht Treaty of 1992, Denmark secured a protocol which gave it the right to decide if and when they would join the euro. Denmark subsequently notified the Council of the European Communities of their decision to opt out of the euro. This was done in response to the Maastricht Treaty having been rejected by the Danish people in a referendum earlier that year. As a result of the changes, the treaty was ratified in a subsequent referendum held in 1993. On 28 September 2000, a euro referendum was held in Denmark resulting in a 53.2% vote against the government's proposal to join the euro.

Although the referendum rejected adopting the euro, the country as an ERM-II member still follows the policies set forth in the EMU; meaning that Denmark policy wise aspires to meet all economic convergence criteria needed to adopt the euro, while deliberately failing only to meet the fifth legislation criteria - in full accordance with its treaty opt-out from eurozone membership.

Since 2007, the Danish government has discussed holding another referendum on euro adoption. Prime Minister Lars Løkke Rasmussen contemplated but never held a second euro referendum, both in 2009 and 2011. However the political and financial uncertainty due to the European debt crisis led this to be postponed.

Opinion polls, which had generally favoured euro adoption from 2002 to 2010, showed a rapid decline in support during the height of the European debt crisis, reaching a low in May 2012 with 26% in favour towards 67% against while 7% were in doubt. In March 2018, 29% of respondents from Denmark in a Eurobarometer opinion poll stated that they were in favour of the EMU and the euro, whereas 65% were against it, and 6% undecided. The exact same poll conducted in May 2024, signaled a gradual rise for supporting the euro from the previous level recorded in 2012 and 2018; with 34% now in favour, 58% against and 8% undecided.

A second referendum to abolish the opt-out and adopt the euro is not on the 2023–2026 agenda of the current Danish government.

=== Hungary ===
With their accession to the EU in 2004, Hungary began planning to adopt the euro in place of the forint. However, the country's high deficit delayed this. After the 2006 election, Prime Minister Ferenc Gyurcsány introduced austerity measures, reducing the deficit to less than 5% in 2007 from 9.2%. In February 2011, newly elected Prime Minister Viktor Orbán, of the right-wing populist and Eurosceptic Fidesz party, made clear that he did not expect the euro to be adopted in Hungary before 1 January 2020. Orbán said the country was not yet ready to adopt the currency and they will not discuss the possibility until the public debt reaches a 50% threshold. The public debt-to-GDP ratio was 81.0% when Orban's 50% target was set in 2011, and it was forecast to decline to 73.5% in 2016. In April 2013, Viktor Orbán further added that Hungarian purchasing power parity weighted GDP per capita must also reach 90% of the eurozone average. Shortly after Viktor Orbán had been re-elected as Prime Minister for another four-year term in April 2014, the Hungarian Central Bank announced they plan to distribute a new series of Forint bank notes in 2018. In June 2015, Orbán himself declared that his government would no longer entertain the idea of replacing the forint with the euro in 2020, as was previously suggested, and instead expected the forint to remain "stable and strong for the next several decades".

In July 2016, National Economy Minister Mihály Varga suggested that the country could adopt the euro by the "end of the decade", but only if economic trends continue to improve and the common currency becomes more stable. While Varga backed away from that, saying convergence was still needed, Sándor Csányi (the head of the country's largest bank and ranked the second most influential man in Hungary) argued that further integration of the eurozone would provide a likely catalyst as Hungary would not want to be left out of closer integration.

Following the 2026 parliamentary election and the formation of the pro-European Tisza government under Prime Minister Péter Magyar, Hungary's approach towards euro adoption shifted significantly. The new government declared its intention to meet the Maastricht convergence criteria by around 2030 and described euro adoption as a strategic objective, while stressing that the final decision on introducing the common currency would be made only after public consultation and once the necessary economic conditions had been fulfilled. The Eurogroup also expressed its willingness to support Hungary's preparations for eventual euro area membership.

An April 2026 Eurobarometer poll, showed that 80% of Hungarians favour adoption of the euro in Hungary.

=== Poland ===
The Polish government in 2012 under Prime Minister Donald Tusk had favoured euro adoption, however it did not have the required two-thirds majority in the Sejm to amend the constitution to make it legally compatible with euro adoption, due to the opposition of the Law and Justice Party to the euro. Further opposition arose due to the on-going sovereign-debt crisis, with the Polish National Bank recommending Poland wait until the Eurozone had overcome the crisis. The leader of the Law and Justice Party, Jarosław Kaczyński, stated in 2013 that "I do not foresee any moment when the adoption of the euro would be advantageous for us" and called for a referendum on euro adoption. Donald Tusk responded saying he was open to a referendum, as part of a package in Parliament to approve the constitutional amendment. However the 2015 Polish elections were won by Law and Justice who not only opposed any further moves towards membership, but whose relations with the EU degenerated due to a potential violation of EU values by Poland. A group of Polish economists have suggested that euro adoption could be a way of smoothing over relations from the dispute.

Polls have generally showed that Poles are opposed to adopting the euro straight away, with a eurobarometer poll in April 2015 showing that 44% of Polish people are in favour of introducing the euro (a decrease of 1% from 2014), whereas 53% are opposed (no change from 2014). However, polls conducted by TNS Polska throughout 2012–2015 have consistently shown support for eventually adopting the euro, though that support depends on the target date. According to the latest TNS Polska poll from June 2015, the share who supported adoption was 46% against 41%. When asked about the appropriate timing, the supporters were divided into three groups of equal size, with 15% advocating for adoption within the next 5 years, another 14% preferring it should happen between 6–10 years from now, and finally 17% arguing it should happen more than 10 years from now.

An April 2026 Eurobarometer poll, showed that 43% of Poles now favour adoption of the euro in Poland.

=== Romania ===
Originally, the euro was scheduled to be adopted by Romania in place of the leu by 2014. In April 2012 the Romanian convergence report submitted under the Stability and Growth Pact listed 1 January 2015 to be the target date for euro adoption. In April 2013 Prime Minister Victor Ponta has stated that "eurozone entry remains a fundamental objective for Romania but we can't enter poorly prepared", and that 2020 was a more realistic target. The Romanian Central Bank governor, Mugur Isărescu, admitted the target was ambitious, but obtainable if the political parties passed a legal roadmap for the required reforms to be implemented, and clarified this roadmap should lead to Romania entering ERM II only on 1 January 2017 so the euro could be adopted after two years of ERM II membership on 1 January 2019.

As of April 2015, the Romanian government concluded it was still on track to attain its target for euro adoption in 2019, both in regards of ensuring full compliance with all nominal convergence criteria and in regards of ensuring a prior satisfying degree of "real convergence". The Romanian target for "real convergence" ahead of euro adoption, is for its GDP per capita (in purchasing power standards) to be above 60% of the same average figure for the entire European Union, and according to the latest outlook, this relative figure was now forecast to reach 65% in 2018 and 71% in 2020, after having risen at the same pace from 29% in 2002 to 54% in 2014. However, in September 2015 Romania's central bank governor Mugur Isarescu said that the 2019 target was no longer realistic. The Romanian foreign minister, Teodor Meleșcanu, declared in August 2017 that he thought Romania would be ready to "adopt the euro in five years, in 2022".

In March 2018, however, members of the ruling Social Democratic Party (PSD) voted at an extraordinary congress to initially back a 2024 target year to adopt the euro as Romania's currency. But in February 2021, the country was scheduled only to enter ERM II in 2024, with the target year for euro adoption delayed to 2027 or 2028. In December 2021, the euro adoption target was further delayed to 2029. In March 2023, the government maintained the target for euro adoption to be 2029, while the target to enter the antechamber of the eurozone (ERM-II) was set to 2026.

The Romanian Fiscal Council, represented by its president Daniel Dăianu, handed over a fiscal advice and analysis to the Romanian government in August 2023, concluding that the ongoing troubles to limit the excessive budget deficit had delayed the earliest year of ERM-II membership to 2026/2027 and euro adoption to 2029/2030. The current national plan for adoption of the euro established a self-imposed criterion for Romania to reduce its structural budget deficit to 1% of GDP before entering ERM II. After reaching a historic high at 7.4% of GDP in 2020, the structural budget deficit was forecast to continue exceeding this ERM II criterion at a projected 5.7% of GDP in 2023 and 4.8% of GDP in 2024.

In February 2024, Finance Minister Marcel Boloș stated that even with the new more lenient EU fiscal rules entering into force starting from fiscal year 2025, which he expected would extend the adjustment period for Romania and move the required exit of its ongoing Excessive Deficit Procedure (EDP) from 2024 to 2027, the implementation of some significant annual budget cuts amounting to 0.5% of GDP each year would still be required. Romania was at first granted 4 years to correct its excessive deficit when the procedure was opened in 2020, but the Finance Minister assessed that Romania would likely now need a full maximum seven years to adjust, and admitted that "as long as we don’t enter on a clear fiscal consolidation path, euro-entry remains just a longer-term objective."

The latest mid-term fiscal plan of the Romanian government targets a budget deficit of 5.0% of GDP in 2024, and will only reduce it to below the EDP-required limit of 3% of GDP in 2027. Moody's projected a budget deficit of 5.7% of GDP in 2024, and assessed that "the European Commission will likely conclude this spring that Romania has failed to meet its fiscal targets under the Excessive Deficit Procedure, but Moody's expects that the government will not announce any additional consolidation efforts until after the parliamentary elections in the second half of 2024." In May 2024, the budget deficit was recorded to 6.6% of GDP in 2023, and projected by the commission to reach 6.9% of GDP in 2024.

Despite having declared itself to be bound by the strictest fiscal provisions of the European Fiscal Compact, Romania, as a non-eurozone member state, will not be subject to the standard fine of 0.2% of GDP for having failed to meet its fiscal targets under the EDP (a deficit at maximum 4.4% of GDP in 2023 and 2.9% of GDP in 2024). However, the European Commission has previously warned Romania that failure to meet the fiscal targets of its EDP could result in the partial cancellation of ongoing payments (grants and loans) from its National Recovery and Resilience Plan for 2021-2026, of which 9 out of 28.5 billion euro had been paid as of March 2024.

In February 2026, Romanian president Nicușor Dan reaffirmed the goal of joining the eurozone and stated that Romania could meet the criteria for adopting the euro in the next 3 to 4 years. In July 2026, Dan announced a political agreement between the main centrist political parties to elaborate jointly with the National Bank of Romania a roadmap for joining the eurozone.

On 17 August 2026, Dragoș Pîslaru, the Minister of Investments and European Projects, explicitly said that 2032 could be an important target for Romania's entry into the eurozone.

In the late September 2026, Alexandru Nazare, the Minister of Finance announced that Romania aims to join the eurozone by 2035. To achieve this the country must exit the excessive deficit procedure by 2030.

=== Sweden ===
Although Sweden is required to replace the krona with the euro eventually, it maintains that joining the ERM II, a requirement for euro adoption, is voluntary, and has chosen to not join pending public approval by a referendum, thereby intentionally avoiding the fulfillment of the adoption requirements. On 14 September 2003, 56% of Swedes voted against adopting the euro in a referendum. Most of Sweden's major parties believe that it would be in the national interest to join, but they have all pledged to abide by the result of the referendum. Former Prime Minister Fredrik Reinfeldt stated in December 2007 that there would be no new referendum until there was stable support for "yes" in the polls, and this position remained unchanged in the political platform of his party Moderaterna in 2013.

From 2004 to 2009, polls generally showed stable support for the "no" alternative, except for a few polls in 2009 which showed a narrow lead for "yes". Strong support for "no" existed from 2010 to 2014, with 73% opposing and only 23% supporting euro introduction in a November 2014 poll. According to Eurobarometer polls, the numbers of Swedes favouring adoption of the euro in Sweden grew to 32% in April 2015, 45% in April 2022 and 54% in April 2023.

As a result of an increase in support in recent opinion polls and the twentieth anniversary of the first euro referendum in Sweden, the question about organizing a second euro referendum received renewed attention in September 2023; although only one of the Swedish parliamentary parties (Liberalerna) opted to push for introducing the euro as swiftly as possible, while the Centerpartiet opted to open up an investigation into the pros and cons.

An April 2026 Eurobarometer poll showed 51% of Swedes favor the adoption of the Euro.

== Outside the EU ==
The EU's position is that no independent sovereign state is allowed to join the eurozone without first being a full member of the European Union (EU). However, four independent sovereign European microstates situated within the borders of the eurozone states, have such a small size — rendering them unlikely ever to join the EU — that they have been allowed to adopt the euro through the signing of monetary agreements, which granted them rights to mint local euro coins without gaining a seat in the European Central Bank. In addition, some dependent territories of EU member states have also been allowed to use the euro without being part of the EU, conditional the signing of agreements where a eurozone state guarantee their prior adoption of regulations applying specifically for the eurozone.

=== Current adopters ===
==== European microstates ====
The European microstates of Monaco, San Marino and the Vatican City, which had a monetary agreement with a eurozone state when the euro was introduced, were granted a special permission to continue these agreements and to issue separate euro coins, but they are not entitled to any input or observer status in the economic affairs of the eurozone. Andorra, which had used the euro unilaterally since the inception of the currency, negotiated a similar agreement which granted them the right to officially use the euro as of 1 April 2012 and to issue euro coins.

| State | Adopted euro | Issuing rights granted from | Population |
|---|---|---|---|
| Andorra | 1 January 2002 (de facto) (Note: Between 1 January 2002, when the euro was launched, and 1 April 2012, when their Monetary Agreement with the EU came into force, Andorra did not have an official currency but used the euro as their de facto currency.); 1 April 2012 (de jure) | 1 July 2013 | 82,000 |
| Monaco | 1 January 1999 | 1 January 2002 | 32,671 |
| San Marino | 1 January 1999 | 1 January 2002 | 29,615 |
| Vatican City | 1 January 1999 | 1 January 2002 | 800 |

==== Kosovo and Montenegro ====
Kosovo and Montenegro have unilaterally adopted and used the euro since its launch, as they previously used the German mark rather than the Yugoslav dinar in Serbia and Montenegro. This was due to political concerns that Serbia would use the currency to destabilise these provinces (Montenegro was then in a union with Serbia) so they received Western help in adopting and using the mark (though there was no restriction on the use of the dinar or any other currency). They switched to the euro when the mark was replaced, but have signed no monetary agreement with the ECB; rather the country depends only on euro already in circulation. Kosovo also still uses the Serbian dinar, which replaced the Yugoslav dinar, in areas mainly populated by the Serbian minority.

| State | Unilaterally adopted euro | Status | Population |
|---|---|---|---|
| Kosovo | 1 January 2002 (Note: The Deutsche Mark was declared by UNMIK as legal tender in Kosovo on 4 October 1999. When Germany yielded the Deutsche Mark for the Euro on 1 January 2002, this also happened in Kosovo. Subsequently the Republic of Kosovo unilaterally adopted the Euro as its official currency.) | Potential candidate seeking EU membership | 1,700,000 |
| Montenegro | 1 January 2002 (Note: Montenegro abandon the use of the Yugoslav dinar in November 1999. Since then, the Deutsche Mark was used as legal tender. When Germany yielded the Deutsche Mark for the Euro on 1 January 2002, Montenegro unilaterally adopted the Euro as its official currency.) | Candidate seeking EU membership | 684,736 |

=== Potential adopters ===
==== Dutch overseas territories ====
| Territory | ISO 3166-1 code | ISO 4217 code | Notes |
|---|---|---|---|
| Aruba | AW | AWG | Aruba is part of the Kingdom of the Netherlands, but not the EU. It uses the Aruban florin, which is pegged to the US dollar (1 dollar = 1.79 florins). |
| Curaçao | CW | XCG | Uses the Caribbean guilder, also pegged to the US dollar (1 dollar = 1.79 guilder). |
| Sint Maarten | SX | XCG | Uses the Caribbean guilder, also pegged to the US dollar (1 dollar = 1.79 guilder). |
| Caribbean Netherlands | BQ | USD | Uses the US dollar. |

==== Danish overseas territories ====
The Danish krone is currently used by both of its dependent territories, Greenland and Faroe Islands, with their monetary policy controlled by the Danish Central Bank. If Denmark does adopt the euro, separate referendums would be required in both territories to decide whether they should follow suit. Both territories have voted not to be a part of the EU in the past, and their populations will not participate in the Danish euro referendum. The Faroe Islands use a special version of the Danish krone notes and coins that have been printed and minted with text in the Faroese language. It is regarded as a foreign currency, but can be exchanged 1:1 with the Danish version. On 5 November 2009 the Faroese Parliament approved a proposal to investigate the possibility for euro adoption, including an evaluation of the legal and economic impact of adopting the euro ahead of Denmark.

==== French overseas territories ====
| Territory | ISO 3166-1 code | ISO 4217 code | Notes |
|---|---|---|---|
| French Polynesia | PF | XPF | Use the CFP franc, pegged to the Euro. |
| New Caledonia | NC | XPF | Use the CFP franc, pegged to the Euro. |
| Wallis and Futuna | WF | XPF | Use the CFP franc, pegged to the Euro. |

The French government has recommended that all three territories decide in favour of adopting the euro. French Polynesia has declared itself in favour of joining the eurozone. Wallis and Futuna announced a neutral standpoint, that they would support a currency choice similar to what New Caledonia chooses.

However, New Caledonia has yet to make a decision. Following an independence referendum held in November 2018, (Note: According to the Nouméa Accord, the Congress of New Caledonia was entitled to schedule an independence referendum during 2014–18, if a ⅔ majority for this exist in the Congress. Had the Congress refrained to call the referendum during 2014–18, the French state would have called for it to take place in November 2018. Had the electorate voted "yes" to full independence, the territory would have changed status from its current OCT status to becoming a fully sovereign state. The electorate voting "no" to full independence, a second independence referendum was called two years later, asking if the electorate is certain about their choice. The electorate confirmed their "no vote" in the second independence referendum, and a third and final one was called two years later, asking if the electorate is absolutely sure. The "no vote" having been confirmed again, settled the question, meaning that New Caledonia would maintain its current autonomy powers while continuing being a dependent OCT associated with France. In theory, the territory also had the third option "to become an integrated part of France as an Outermost region (OMR status)" — which automatically also would make it an integrated part of EU and the Eurozone — but this was not under consideration by any of the established political parties on the island, and thus not an option for the electorate to vote for in the independence referendum.) their opinion on whether or not to adopt the euro depended on the outcome. The result in 2018 was to stay with France, as confirmed later in 2020 and 2021 referendums.

If the three collectivities decide to adopt the euro, the French government would make an application on their behalf to the European Council, and the switch to the euro could be made after a couple of years. If the collectivities fail to reach a unanimous decision about the future of the CFP franc, it would be technically possible to implement an individual currency decision for each territory.

==== Northern Cyprus ====
Northern Cyprus is legally part of the EU, but European law is suspended due to the region being under the control of the Turkish Republic of Northern Cyprus, which the EU does not recognise. The North uses the Turkish lira instead of the euro, although the euro circulates alongside the lira and other currencies. If the Cyprus dispute is resolved in a manner that results in a single Cypriot state rather than formal acceptance of the status quo, the euro would become the currency of the whole island. Adoption would be the first time the euro has replaced use of another currency that hasn't ceased to exist after euro adoption. Cypriot euro coins already bear the name of Cyprus in both Greek and Turkish.

As a consequence of the ongoing Turkish currency crisis, some Northern Cypriot economists are calling for the region to adopt the euro to curb the high inflation and switch to a stable currency.

A majority, 63.27%, of Northern Cypriots believe that Northern Cyprus should switch to the euro, while 36.73% do not support this view.

=== Past debates ===
==== Iceland ====
During the 2008–2011 Icelandic financial crisis, instability in the króna led to discussion in Iceland about adopting the euro. However, Jürgen Stark, a Member of the executive board of the European Central Bank, has stated that "Iceland would not be able to adopt the EU currency without first becoming a member of the EU". Iceland subsequently applied for EU membership. As of the ECB's May 2012 convergence report, Iceland did not meet any of the convergence criteria. One year later, the country had achieved compliance with the deficit criteria and had begun to decrease its debt-to-GDP ratio, but still suffered from elevated HICP inflation and long-term governmental interest rates. On 13 September 2013, a newly elected government dissolved the accession negotiation team and thus suspended Iceland's application to join the European Union until a referendum can be held on whether or not the accession negotiations should resume; if negotiations do resume, after they are completed the public will then have the opportunity in a second referendum to vote on "whether or not Iceland shall join the EU on the negotiated terms".

==== United Kingdom ====
Before Brexit, the potential adoption of the euro was part of public discourse in the United Kingdom. The country secured an opt-out from being required to switch its currency to the euro, and never sought to adopt the currency. Following Brexit, the topic is no longer part of public discourse.

The British Overseas Territory of Akrotiri and Dhekelia, located on the island of Cyprus, is the only territory under British sovereignty to use the Euro.

While not an official currency in Gibraltar, most retail outlets there do accept the euro.

== Public opinion ==
Public support for the euro in states that have joined the EU since 2004

View source data.

== See also ==
- Withdrawal from the eurozone
- Enlargement of the European Union
- History of the European Union
