= Adoption of the euro in Cyprus =

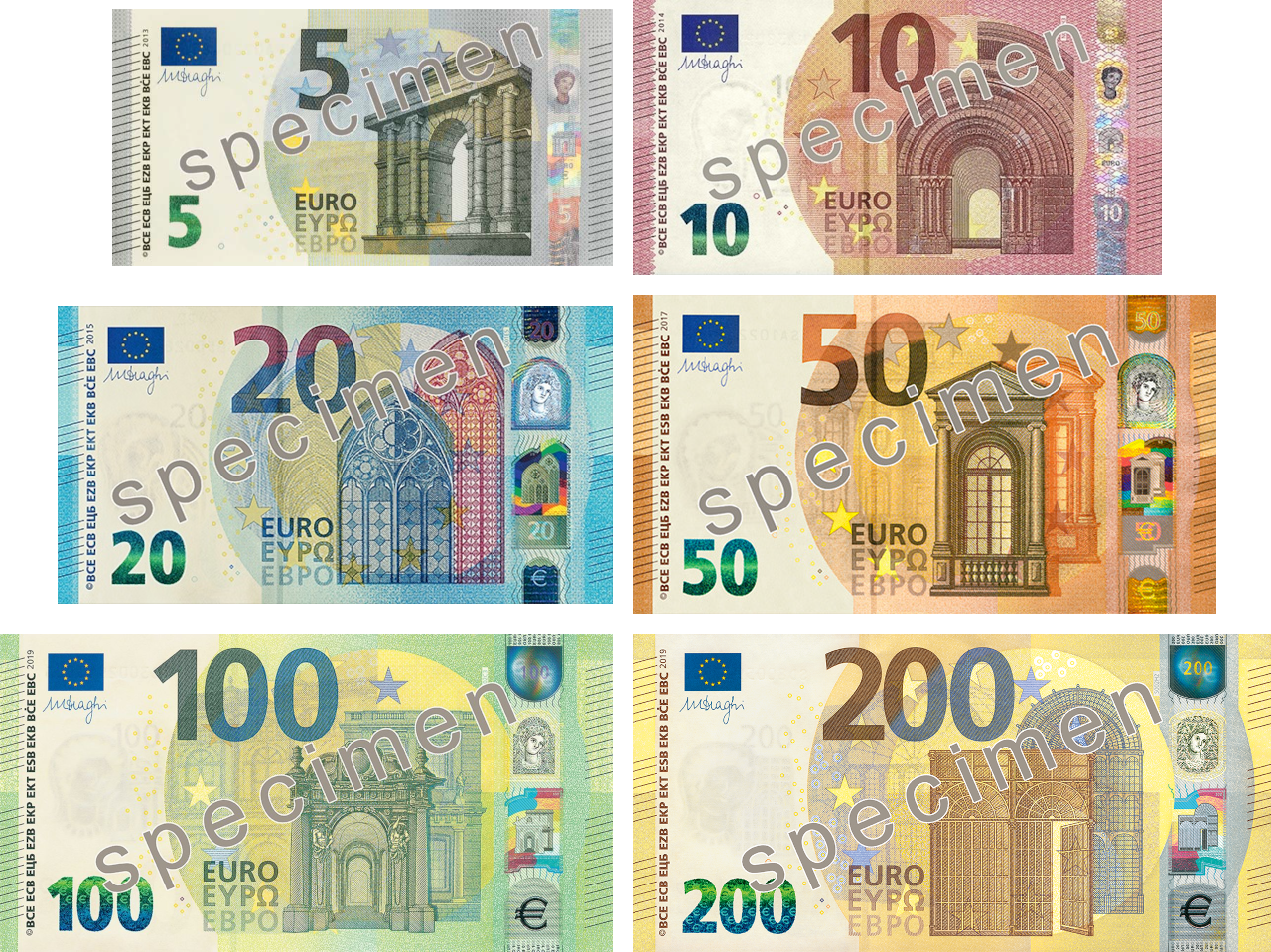
- Euro banknotes - all denominations
- Date: 1 January 2008 (introduction) – 14 January 2008 (complete transition).
- Location: Cyprus
- Type: Economic transition
- Theme: Adoption of the euro as the national currency
- Participants: Government of Cyprus, European Union
- Outcome: Replacement of the Cypriot pound with the euro

Eurozone participation European Union member states (special territories not shown) 21 in the eurozone 1 in ERM II, with an opt-out (Denmark) 5 not in ERM II, but committed to join the eurozone after meeting the convergence criteria (Czech Republic, Hungary, Poland, Romania, and Sweden) Non–EU member states 4 using the euro with a monetary agreement (Andorra, Monaco, San Marino, and Vatican City) 2 using the euro unilaterally (Kosovo and Montenegro)

Cyprus officially adopted the euro on January 1, 2008, becoming the 14th member of the euro area. When Cyprus joined the European Union in 2004 it committed to join the eurozone and replace its currency, the Cypriot pound, with the euro. The government of Cyprus replacing the Cypriot pound at an irrevocable fixed rate of 0.585274 pounds per one euro. This change came less than four years after Cyprus joined the European Union in 2004, making it part of the eurozone.

== History ==
When it joined the EU in 2004, Cyprus committed to switching its currency, the Cypriot pound, to the euro, as stated in the 2003 EU accession treaty. The transition would occur once the country meets all the euro convergence criteria. The European Central Bank (ECB) and the European Commission prepared their respective Convergence Reports in 2007 and based on the result of that report in May 2007 the European Commission concluded that Cyprus had fulfilled the necessary conditions for the adoption of the single currency. Therefore, The European Commission confirmed Cyprus met all convergence criteria. In July 2007 the EU Council adopted a decision allowing Cyprus to adopt the euro as its currency from 1 January 2008. The government of Cyprus chose a 'big bang' scenario, with cash entering use on the same day that the euro officially became the country’s new currency (1 January 2008), and a dual circulation period running until 31 January 2008 during which payments could be made using both Cyprus pound notes and coins as well as the euro. The exchange of former Cypriot national currency was allowed at commercial banks until the end of June 2008, with a limit of 1,000 Cypriot pounds for banknotes and 50 Cypriot pounds for coins per transaction. Also, at the Central Bank of Cyprus until 31 December 2009 for Cyprus pound coins, and until 31 December 2017 for Cyprus pound banknotes.

== See also ==
- 2004 enlargement of the European Union
- Cypriot euro coins
- Cypriot pound
- Enlargement of the eurozone
- International status and usage of the euro
- Economic and monetary union
- History of the euro
- European Currency Unit
- European Central Bank
- European Union
- European Economic Community
- History of Cyprus
