= Adoption of the euro in Ireland =

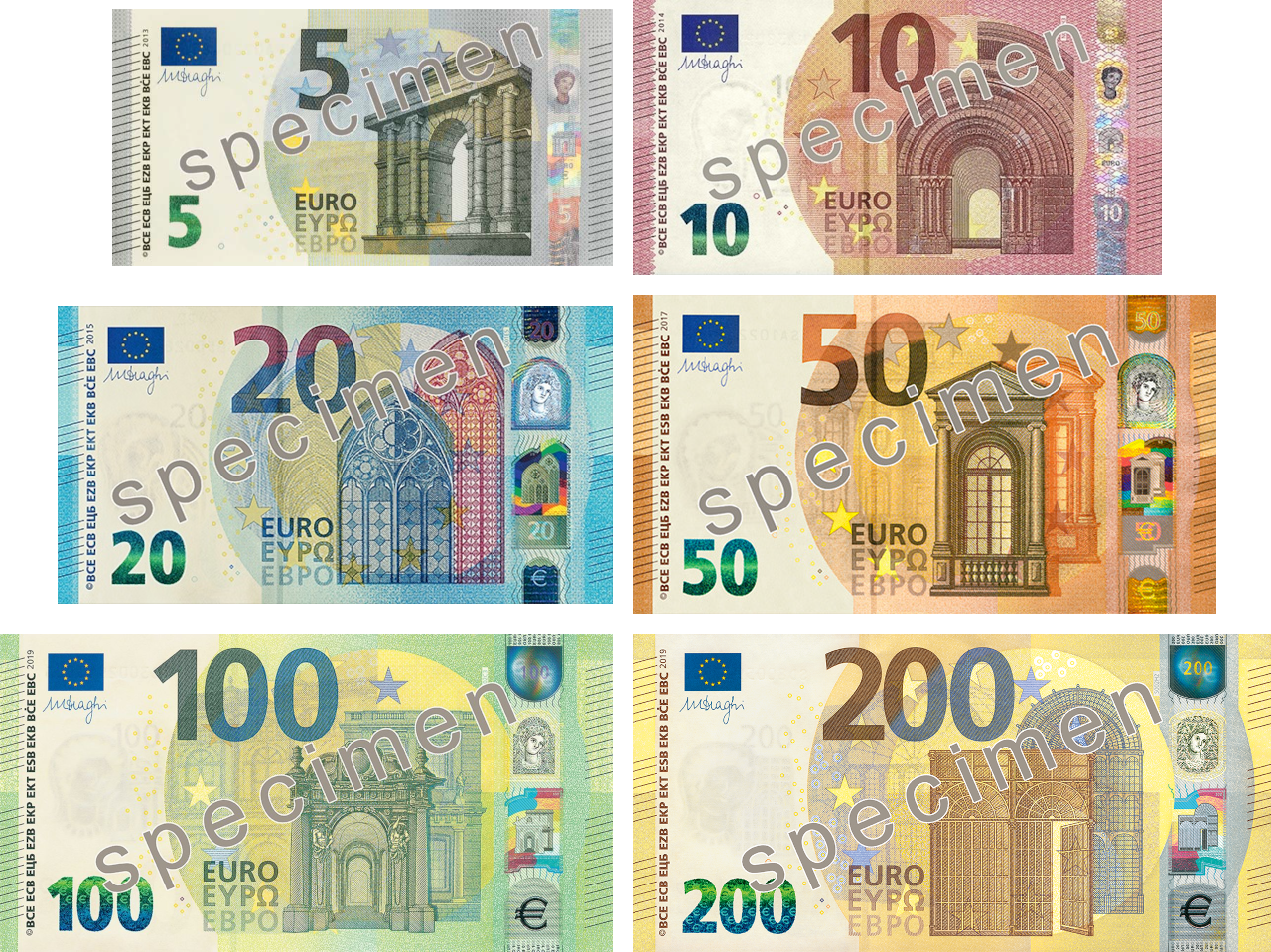
- Euro banknotes - all denominations
- Date: 1 January 2002 (Introduction); 9 February 2002 (Complete transition)
- Location: Republic of Ireland
- Type: Economic transition
- Theme: Adoption of the euro as the national currency
- Outcome: Replacement of the Irish pound with the euro

Eurozone participation European Union member states (special territories not shown) 21 in the eurozone 1 in ERM II, with an opt-out (Denmark) 5 not in ERM II, but committed to join the eurozone after meeting the convergence criteria (Czech Republic, Hungary, Poland, Romania, and Sweden) Non–EU member states 4 using the euro with a monetary agreement (Andorra, Monaco, San Marino, and Vatican City) 2 using the euro unilaterally (Kosovo and Montenegro)

Ireland was one of the first countries to adopt the Euro after its introduction in 1999, phasing out its previous national currency, the Irish pound, entirely after 1 January 2002.

== History ==
=== Conceptualization of the euro on European level ===
The conceptualization of the euro began in the late 1970s, sparked by the desire for a European response to the dominance of the U.S. dollar. German Chancellor Helmut Schmidt and French President Valéry Giscard d’Estaing played pivotal roles in this development. Initially, the euro served as an accounting unit for international transactions, known as the ECU, before evolving into a common currency.

The euro officially came into existence on 1 January 1999, as part of efforts to create an economic and monetary union within the European Union. Ireland was one of the first countries to adopt the euro, with the Irish pound ceasing to be legal tender after 31 December 2001.

=== Process of euro adoption in Ireland ===
The transition to the euro in Ireland involved a three-year period, starting from 1 January 1999, during which the euro existed as "book money". Euro banknotes and coins were introduced on 1 January 2002. This was the earliest date for any member state when the national currency ceased to be legal tender. The Irish government introduced a dual circulation period – when both the Irish pound and the euro had legal tender status. This ended on 9 February 2002. The government of Ireland replaced the Irish pound at a fixed conversion rate of 0.787564 IEP per one euro. Irish government and financial institutions undertook extensive efforts to ensure a seamless transition to the Euro. This included the modification of financial software, recalibration of ATMs, and widespread distribution of new euro banknotes and coins. The exchange of the former Irish national currency was done by the Central Bank of Ireland, and it continues to exchange Irish pound banknotes and coins for an unlimited period.

== See also ==
- 1973 enlargement of the European Communities
- Irish euro coins
- Irish pound
- Enlargement of the eurozone
- International status and usage of the euro
- Economic and monetary union
- History of the euro
- European Currency Unit
- European Central Bank
- European Union
- European Economic Community
- History of Ireland
