= Adoption of the euro in Austria =

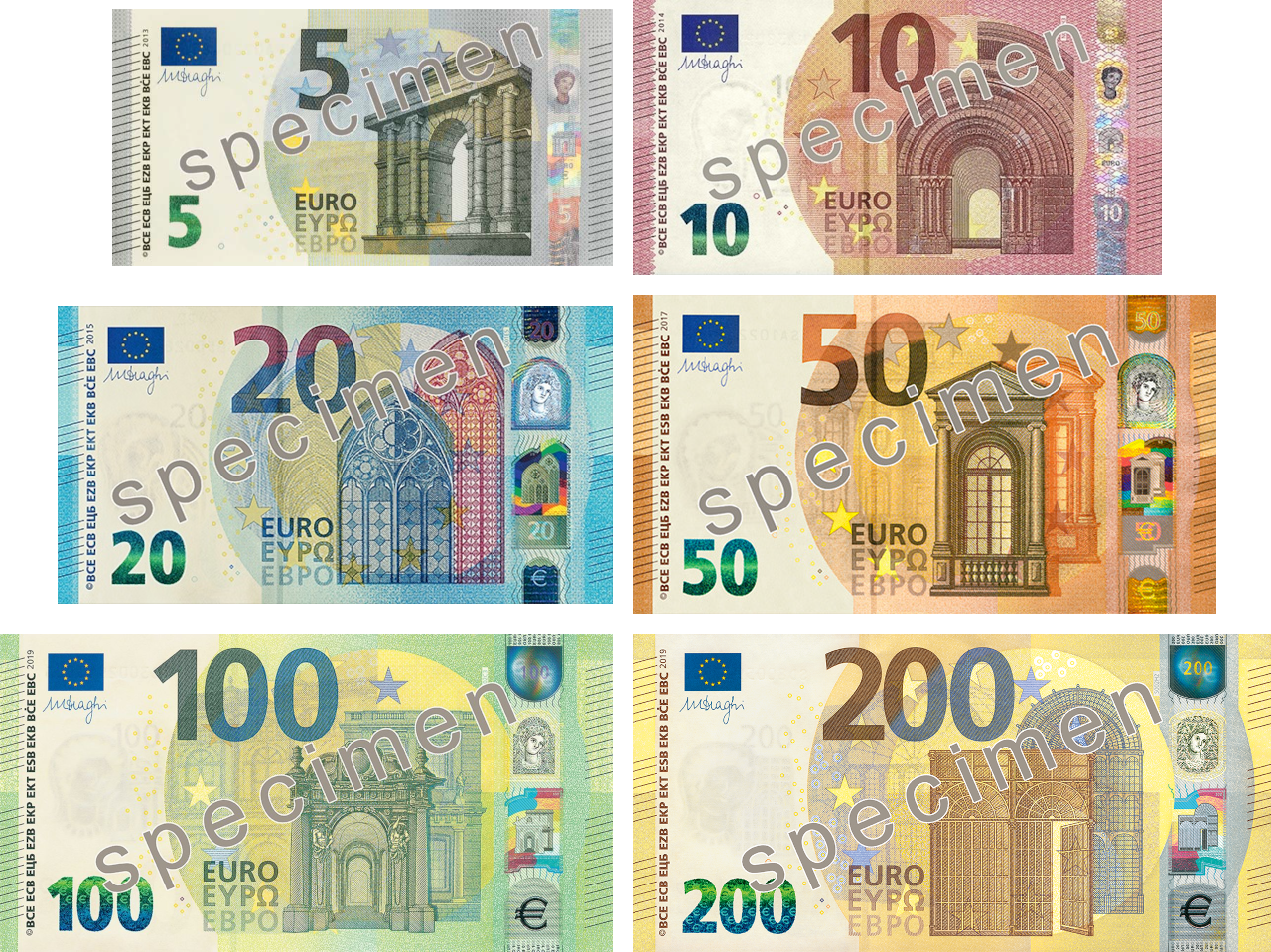
- Euro banknotes - all denominations
- Date: 1 January 2002 (Introduction); 28 February 2002 (Complete Transition)
- Location: Austria
- Type: Economic Transition
- Theme: Adoption of the euro as the national currency
- Outcome: Replacement of the Austrian schilling with the Euro

Eurozone participation European Union member states (special territories not shown) 21 in the eurozone 1 in ERM II, with an opt-out (Denmark) 5 not in ERM II, but committed to join the eurozone after meeting the convergence criteria (Czech Republic, Hungary, Poland, Romania, and Sweden) Non–EU member states 4 using the euro with a monetary agreement (Andorra, Monaco, San Marino, and Vatican City) 2 using the euro unilaterally (Kosovo and Montenegro)

Austria was one of the first countries to adopt the Euro after its introduction in 1999, phasing out its previous national currency, the Austrian schilling, entirely after 1 January 2002.

== History ==
=== Conceptualization of the euro on European level ===
The conceptualization of the euro began in the late 1970s, sparked by the desire for a European response to the dominance of the U.S. dollar. German Chancellor Helmut Schmidt and French President Valéry Giscard d’Estaing played pivotal roles in this development. Initially, the euro served as an accounting unit for international transactions, known as the ECU, before evolving into a common currency. The euro officially came into existence on 1 January 1999, as part of efforts to create an economic and monetary union within the European Union.

=== Process of euro adoption in Austria ===
Austria was one of the first countries to adopt the euro, with the Austrian Schiling ceasing to be legal tender after 31 December 2001.

The transition to the euro in Austria involved a three-year period, starting from 1 January 1999, during which the euro existed as "book money". Euro banknotes and coins were introduced on 1 January 2002. This was the earliest date for any member state when the national currency ceased to be legal tender. The Austrian government introduced dual circulation period – when both the Austrian schilling and the euro had legal tender status – ended on 28 February 2002. The government of Austria replacing the Austrian schilling at a fixed conversion rate of 13.7603 AST per one euro. Austrian government and financial institutions undertook extensive efforts to ensure a seamless transition to the Euro. This included the modification of financial software, recalibration of ATMs, and widespread distribution of new euro banknotes and coins. Also, the exchange of the former Austrian national currency was done by the Österreichische Nationalbank (Austrian National Bank) continues to exchange schilling banknotes and coins for an unlimited period.

== See also ==
- 1995 enlargement of the European Union
- Austrian euro coins
- Austrian schilling
- Enlargement of the eurozone
- International status and usage of the euro
- Economic and monetary union
- History of the euro
- European Currency Unit
- European Central Bank
- European Union
- European Economic Community
- History of Austria
