= Adoption of the euro in Germany =

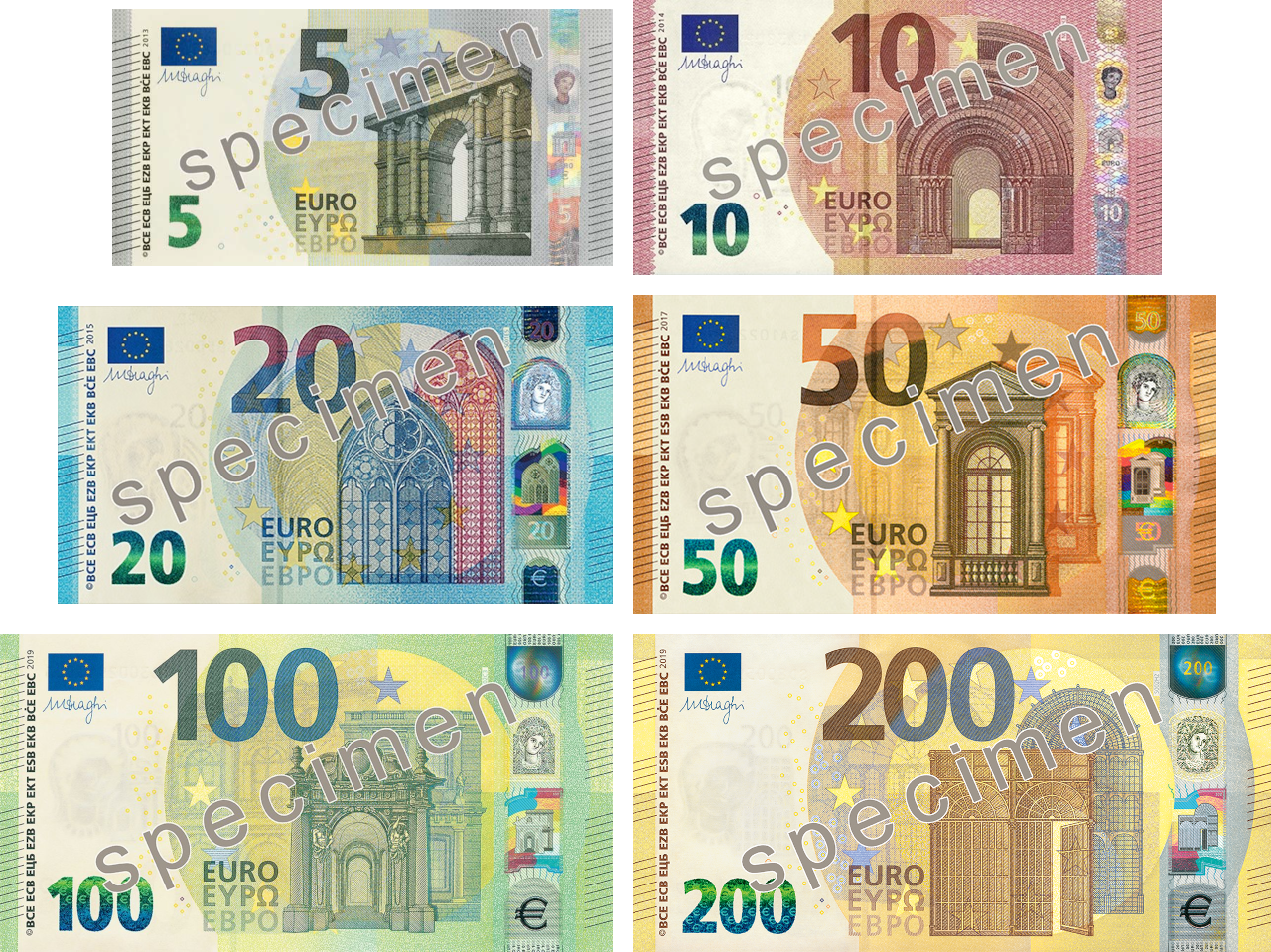
- Euro banknotes - all denominations
- Date: 1 January 2002 (Introduction); 28 February 2002 (Complete Transition)
- Location: Germany
- Type: Economic Transition
- Theme: Adoption of the euro as the national currency
- Outcome: Replacement of the Deutsche Mark with the Euro

Eurozone participation European Union member states (special territories not shown) 21 in the eurozone 1 in ERM II, with an opt-out (Denmark) 5 not in ERM II, but committed to join the eurozone after meeting the convergence criteria (Czech Republic, Hungary, Poland, Romania, and Sweden) Non–EU member states 4 using the euro with a monetary agreement (Andorra, Monaco, San Marino, and Vatican City) 2 using the euro unilaterally (Kosovo and Montenegro)

Germany was one of the first countries to adopt the Euro after its introduction in 1999, phasing out its previous national currency, the Deutsche Mark, entirely after 1 January 2002.

== History ==
=== Conceptualization of the euro on European level ===
The conceptualization of the euro began in the late 1970s, sparked by the desire for a European response to the dominance of the U.S. dollar. German Chancellor Helmut Schmidt and French President Valéry Giscard d’Estaing played pivotal roles in this development. Initially, the euro served as an accounting unit for international transactions, known as the ECU, before evolving into a common currency. The accelerated introduction of the euro was partly influenced by concerns that German reunification might disrupt the balance within the European Union. The euro, in a sense, became intertwined with the process of German unification, reflecting a dual commitment to both national unity and European integration.

The euro officially came into existence on 1 January 1999, as part of efforts to create an economic and monetary union within the European Union. Germany was one of the first countries to adopt the euro, with the Deutsche Mark ceasing to be legal tender after 31 December 2001.

=== Process of euro adoption in Germany ===
The transition to the euro in Germany involved a three-year period, starting from 1 January 1999, during which the euro existed as "book money". Euro banknotes and coins were introduced on 1 January 2002. This was the earliest date for any member state when the national currency ceased to be legal tender.

German government and financial institutions undertook extensive efforts to ensure a seamless transition to the Euro. This included the modification of financial software, recalibration of ATMs, and widespread distribution of new euro banknotes and coins. Special attention was given to training bank staff and retail employees to handle the new currency, ensuring that they could provide assistance to the public during this period of change.

== Economic impact ==
The introduction of the euro in Germany also necessitated significant changes in the governmental financial administration. This involved the complete overhaul of budgetary and accounting systems to accommodate the new currency. The transition impacted various aspects of financial management, from tax collection to public sector salaries, requiring a meticulous and coordinated approach to ensure consistency and accuracy in all financial transactions and records.

A study by the Centre for European Policy in Freiburg indicated that Germany gained significantly from the introduction of the euro. Between 1999 and 2017, Germany gained almost €1.9 trillion/DM 3.71 trillion as a result of the euro's introduction. The new currency created an additional €23,000/DM 45,000 per inhabitant in Germany during this two-decade timeframe.

== Challenges and criticisms ==
The transition to the euro brought about significant challenges, particularly in terms of international competitiveness. A notable difficulty for some Eurozone countries was their inability to devalue their currency, affecting economic stability and trade dynamics. This challenge underscores the complexities of a unified monetary policy within a diverse economic region.

The implementation of the euro also revealed ambiguities in the vision of European monetary integration. Different member states had varied expectations, ranging from enhancing credibility and reducing borrowing costs to establishing a stable monetary regime. A critical point of debate was the Euro's introduction as a common currency without an accompanying political union, leading to discussions about its long-term viability and management challenges in the absence of unified political governance.

Furthermore, the differing approaches to integration among European countries posed additional challenges. Northern European countries, led by Germany, advocated for a rule-based, rigorous approach, while France and southern countries emphasized the need for flexibility and adaptability. This divergence led to conflicting policy preferences and complicated the management of the Eurozone, particularly during the 2008 financial crisis. The crisis exposed vulnerabilities due to the heavy reliance on bank financing in Europe, creating a "doom loop" where government debt issues and banking sector stability were interlinked, exacerbating the Eurozone crisis.

== See also ==
- History of the European Union
- German euro coins
- Deutsche Mark
- Enlargement of the eurozone
- International status and usage of the euro
- Economic and monetary union
- History of the euro
- European Currency Unit
- European Central Bank
- European Union
- European Economic Community
- History of Germany
