= Adoption of the euro in Belgium =

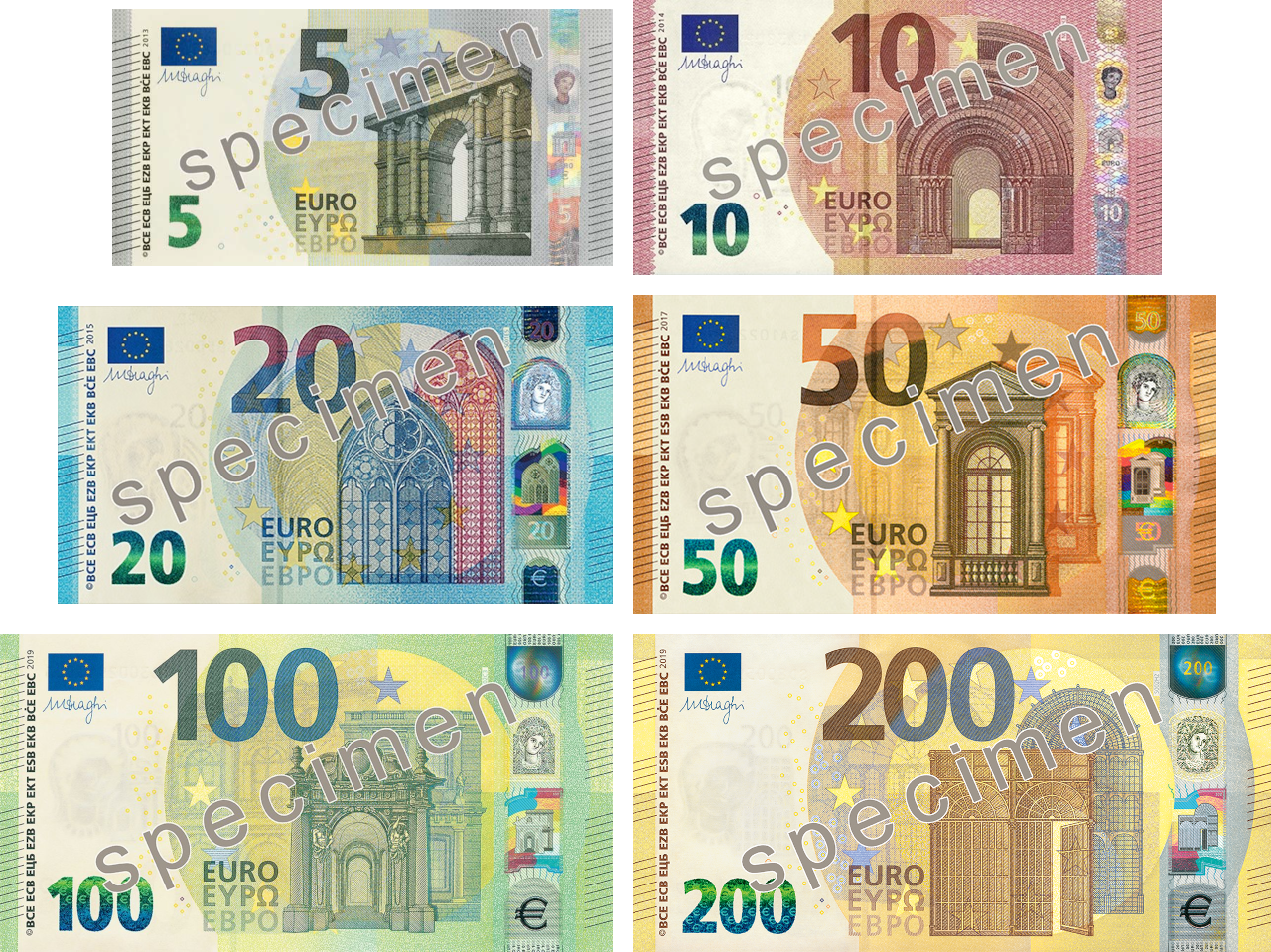
- Euro banknotes - all denominations
- Date: 1 January 2002 (Introduction); 28 February 2002 (Complete Transition)
- Location: Belgium
- Type: Economic Transition
- Theme: Adoption of the euro as the national currency
- Outcome: Replacement of the Belgian franc with the Euro

Eurozone participation European Union member states (special territories not shown) 21 in the eurozone 1 in ERM II, with an opt-out (Denmark) 5 not in ERM II, but committed to join the eurozone after meeting the convergence criteria (Czech Republic, Hungary, Poland, Romania, and Sweden) Non–EU member states 4 using the euro with a monetary agreement (Andorra, Monaco, San Marino, and Vatican City) 2 using the euro unilaterally (Kosovo and Montenegro)

Belgium was one of the first countries to adopt the Euro after its introduction in 1999, phasing out its previous national currency, the Belgian franc, entirely after 1 January 2002.

== History ==
=== Conceptualization of the euro on European level ===
The conceptualization of the euro began in the late 1970s, sparked by the desire for a European response to the dominance of the U.S. dollar. German Chancellor Helmut Schmidt and French President Valéry Giscard d’Estaing played pivotal roles in this development. Initially, the euro served as an accounting unit for international transactions, known as the ECU, before evolving into a common currency.

The euro officially came into existence on 1 January 1999, as part of efforts to create an economic and monetary union within the European Union. Belgium was one of the first countries to adopt the euro, with the Belgian franc ceasing to be legal tender after 31 December 2001.

=== Process of euro adoption in Belgium ===
Belgium was one of the first countries to adopt the euro, with the Belgian franc ceasing to be legal tender after 31 December 2001.

The transition to the euro in Belgium involved a three-year period, starting from 1 January 1999, during which the euro existed as "book money". Euro banknotes and coins were introduced on 1 January 2002. This was the earliest date for any member state when the national currency ceased to be legal tender. The Belgian government introduced dual circulation period – when both the Belgian franc and the euro had legal tender status – ended on 28 February 2002. The government of Belgium replacing the Belgian franc at a fixed conversion rate of 40.3399 BEF per one euro. Belgian government and financial institutions undertook extensive efforts to ensure a seamless transition to the Euro. This included the modification of financial software, recalibration of ATMs, and widespread distribution of new euro banknotes and coins. Also, the exchange of the former Belgian national currency was done by the Banque nationale de Belgique – Nationale Bank van België (National Central Bank of Belgium) exchanged national coins until 31 December 2004 and will continue to exchange national banknotes for an unlimited period.

== See also ==
- History of the European Union
- Belgian euro coins
- Belgian franc
- Enlargement of the eurozone
- International status and usage of the euro
- Economic and monetary union
- History of the euro
- European Currency Unit
- European Central Bank
- European Union
- European Economic Community
- History of Belgium
