= Adoption of the euro in Italy =

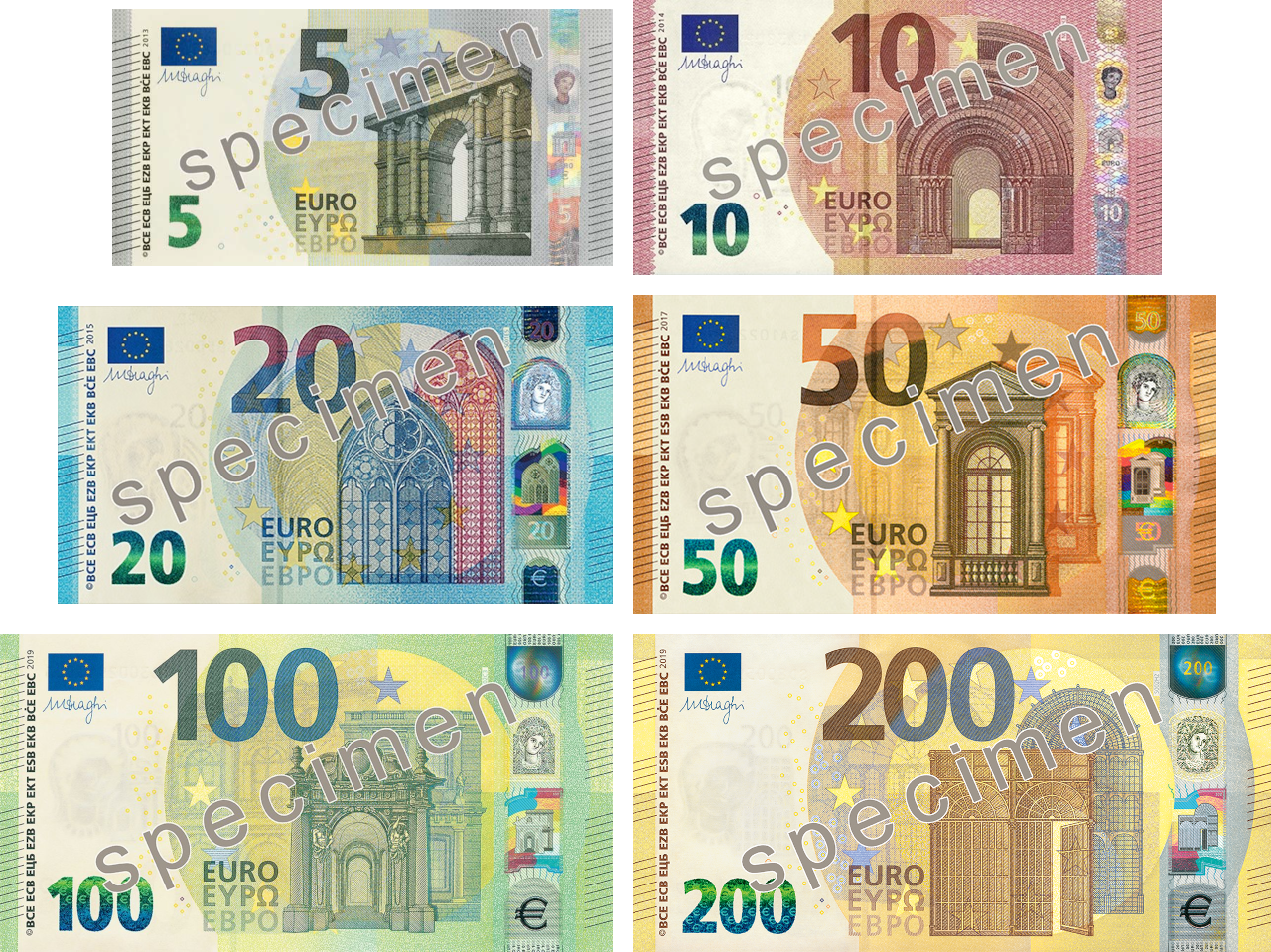
- Euro banknotes - all denominations
- Date: 1 January 2002 (Introduction); 28 February 2002 (Complete Transition)
- Location: Italy
- Type: Economic Transition
- Theme: Adoption of the euro as the national currency
- Outcome: Replacement of the Italian lira with the Euro

Eurozone participation European Union member states (special territories not shown) 21 in the eurozone 1 in ERM II, with an opt-out (Denmark) 5 not in ERM II, but committed to join the eurozone after meeting the convergence criteria (Czech Republic, Hungary, Poland, Romania, and Sweden) Non–EU member states 4 using the euro with a monetary agreement (Andorra, Monaco, San Marino, and Vatican City) 2 using the euro unilaterally (Kosovo and Montenegro)

Italy was one of the first countries to adopt the Euro after its introduction in 1999, phasing out its previous national currency, the Italian lira, entirely after 1 January 2002.

== History ==
=== Conceptualization of the euro on European level ===
The conceptualization of the euro began in the late 1970s, sparked by the desire for a European response to the dominance of the U.S. dollar. German Chancellor Helmut Schmidt and French President Valéry Giscard d’Estaing played pivotal roles in this development. Initially, the euro served as an accounting unit for international transactions, known as the ECU, before evolving into a common currency. The euro officially came into existence on 1 January 1999, as part of efforts to create an economic and monetary union within the European Union.

=== Process of euro adoption in Italy ===
In the period between 1996 and 1998, as part of the process of preparation of the Italian economy to meet the EU convergence criteria, the Italian government pursued strict fiscal consolidation and structural reforms under the vincolo esterno (external constraint) strategy to meet strict EU convergence criteria. The transition process to the euro in Italy also involved a three-year period, starting from 1 January 1999, during which the euro existed as "book money". Euro banknotes and coins were introduced on 1 January 2002. The euro officially came into existence on 1 January 1999, as part of efforts to create an economic and monetary union within the European Union. Italy was one of the first countries to adopt the euro, with the Italian lira ceasing to be legal tender after 31 December 2001. The government of Italy replacing the Italian lira at a fixed conversion rate of 1 936.27 ITL per one euro. As part of the transitioning process, Italian shops introduced in 2001 dual pricing in both lira and euros to ease public familiarity. Moreover, the euro banknotes and coins were introduced in Italy on 1 January 2002, after a transitional period of three years when the euro was the official currency but only existed as 'book money'. The dual circulation period – when both the Italian lira and the euro had legal tender status – ended on 28 February 2002. Therefore, since 28 February 2002, the euro has been the sole legal currency in Italy, ending more than 140 years of Italian lira usage. The Italian government and financial institutions undertook extensive efforts to ensure a seamless transition to the Euro. This included the modification of financial software, recalibration of ATMs, and widespread distribution of new euro banknotes and coins. Also, the exchange of the former Italian national currency was done by the Banca d’Italia (National Central Bank of Italy), which exchanged Italian lira banknotes and coins until 29 February 2012.

== See also ==
- History of the European Union
- Italian euro coins
- Italian lira
- Enlargement of the eurozone
- International status and usage of the euro
- Economic and monetary union
- History of the euro
- European Currency Unit
- European Central Bank
- European Union
- European Economic Community
- History of Italy
