= Monégasque euro coins =

Designs of Monégasque currency

Eurozone participation European Union member states (special territories not shown) 21 in the eurozone 1 in ERM II, with an opt-out (Denmark) 5 not in ERM II, but committed to join the eurozone after meeting the convergence criteria (Czech Republic, Hungary, Poland, Romania, and Sweden) Non–EU member states 4 using the euro with a monetary agreement (Andorra, Monaco, San Marino, and Vatican City) 2 using the euro unilaterally (Kosovo and Montenegro)

Monégasque euro coins are minted by the Monnaie de Paris (Paris Mint). The euro is the official currency of Monaco, although Monaco is not a member of the eurozone or the European Union. All coins are inscribed with the word "Monaco", the year of issue and the twelve stars of Europe.

== Monégasque euro design ==
For images of the common side and a detailed description of the coins, see euro coins.

The first sets of euro coins were minted in 1999 and the euro was put into circulation in the eurozone (and 4 European microstates, like Monaco) in 2002. However, the first euro coins of Monaco are marked 2001, not 1999 or 2002.

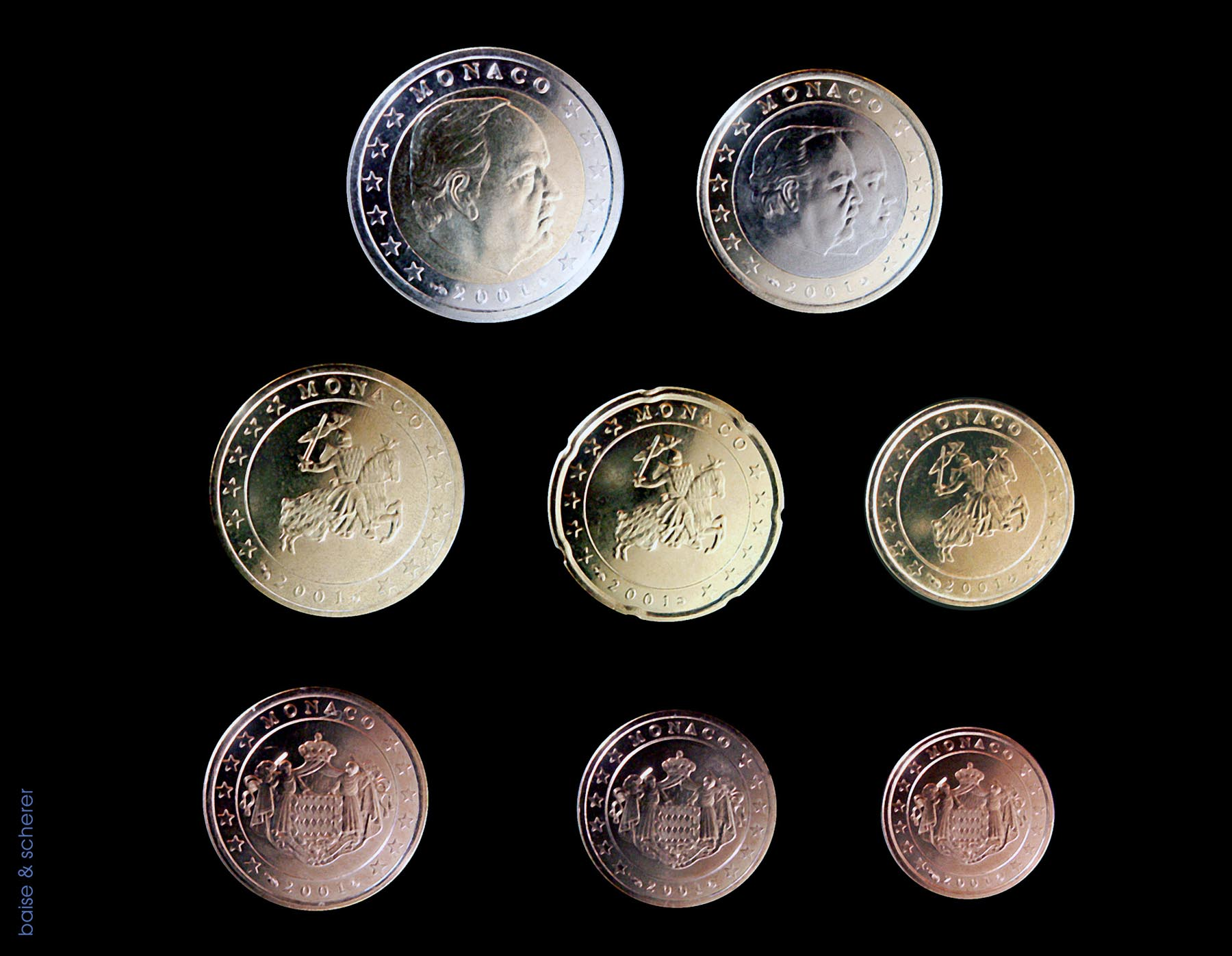
Set of 2001 series coins

=== First series (2001–2005) ===
Depiction of Monégasque euro coinage (2001–2005) | Obverse side
€ 0.01	€ 0.02	€ 0.05
The coat of arms of Monaco
€ 0.10	€ 0.20	€ 0.50
The seal of Monaco
€ 1.00	€ 2.00	€ 2 Coin Edge
		for a total of 12 stars
Jugate effigies of Prince Rainier III and Prince Albert II	Effigy of Prince Rainier III	for a total of 12 stars

=== Second series (2006–2024) ===
With the accession of Prince Albert II in 2005, new designs were warranted and these were issued in December 2006.

Depiction of Monégasque euro coinage (2006–2024) | Obverse side
€ 0.01	€ 0.02	€ 0.05
Coat of arms of Monaco
€ 0.10	€ 0.20	€ 0.50
Monogram of Prince Albert II
€ 1.00	€ 2.00	€ 2 Coin Edge
		for a total of 12 stars
Effigy of Prince Albert II		for a total of 12 stars

=== Third series (2025–present) ===
Monaco revised the design of their €1 and €2 coins in 2025. The engraver opted for a more contemporary representation, along with symbolic elements to represent the Grimaldi family.

Depiction of Monégasque euro coinage (2025–present) | Obverse side
€ 0.01	€ 0.02	€ 0.05
Coat of arms of Monaco
€ 0.10	€ 0.20	€ 0.50
Monogram of Prince Albert II
€ 1.00	€ 2.00	€ 2 Coin Edge
		for a total of 12 stars
Effigy of Prince Albert II		for a total of 12 stars

== Circulating mintage quantities ==
Face Value	€0.01	€0.02	€0.05	€0.10	€0.20	€0.50	€1.00	€2.00
2001	327,200	373,400	300,000	300,000	366,400	300,000	971,100	899,800
2002	s	s	s	367,200	336,000	324,000	472,500	456,000
2003	—N/a	—N/a	—N/a	100,800	100,000	100,000	135,000	228,000
2004	s	s	s	s	s	s	s	s
2005	s	s	s	—N/a	—N/a	—N/a	—N/a	—N/a
2006	s	s	s	s	s	s	s	s
2007	—N/a	—N/a	—N/a	—N/a	—N/a	—N/a	100,000	—N/a
2008	—N/a	—N/a	—N/a	—N/a	—N/a	—N/a	—N/a	—N/a
2009	s	s	s	s	s	s	s	250,000
2010	—N/a	—N/a	—N/a	—N/a	—N/a	—N/a	—N/a	s
2011	s	s	s	s	s	s	s	1,032,052
2012	—N/a	—N/a	—N/a	—N/a	—N/a	—N/a	—N/a	1,082,373
2013	s	s	s	s	s	s	s	s
2014	s	s	s	s	s	s	1,000,272	772,000
2015	—N/a	—N/a	—N/a	—N/a	—N/a	—N/a	—N/a	1,306,782
2016	—N/a	—N/a	—N/a	—N/a	—N/a	—N/a	1,000,000	864,645
2017	s	s	s	s	s	s	s	1,383,528
2018	—N/a	—N/a	—N/a	—N/a	—N/a	—N/a	1,000,000	934,771
2019	—N/a	—N/a	—N/a	—N/a	—N/a	—N/a	550,000	1,995,119
2020	s	s	s	s	s	s	1,087,017	1,000,000
2021	—N/a	—N/a	—N/a	—N/a	—N/a	—N/a	1,167,728	1,035,000
2022	—N/a	—N/a	—N/a	—N/a	—N/a	—N/a	1,180,912	1,050,000
2023	—N/a	—N/a	—N/a	—N/a	—N/a	—N/a	1,256,833	1,000,000
2024	—N/a	—N/a	—N/a	—N/a	—N/a	—N/a	1,531,092	1,100,000
— No coins were minted that year for that denomination s Small quantities minted for sets only

== €2 commemorative coins ==
Year	Subject	Volume	Note

== See also ==
- Monaco–European Union relations
- Monégasque franc
