= Spanish peseta =

Currency of Spain from 1868 to 2002

peseta española (Spanish) Pts
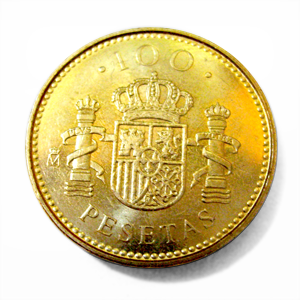
Pts 100
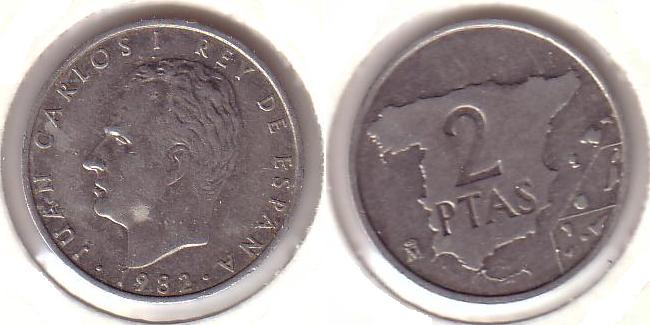
Pts 2 – Map of Spain – 1982

ISO 4217
- Code: ESP before 1981: ESA

Units of account
- Base unit: Peseta
- Plural: Pesetas
- Symbol: Pta/Pts, ₧, or Pt
- Nickname: real (Pta 0.25); pela (Pta 1); duro (Pts 5); talego (Pts 1,000); kilo (Pts 1,000,000)
- Subunit
- 1/100: céntimo (ctm/cts)
- Nickname
- céntimo (ctm/cts): perra chica (5 cts); perra gorda (10 cts)

Denominations
- Banknotes
- Freq. used: Pts 1,000, Pts 2,000, Pts 5,000, Pts 10,000
- Rarely used: Pts 200, Pts 500
- Coins
- Freq. used: Pta 1, Pts 5, Pts 10, Pts 25, Pts 50, Pts 100, Pts 200, Pts 500
- Rarely used: 50 Cts, Pts 2

Demographics
- User(s): None, previously: Spain; (Spain) First Spanish Republic (1873–1874); (Spain) Second Spanish Republic (1931–1939); Francoist Spain (1936–1975); (Spain) Spanish Guinea (1926–1968); (Spain) Spanish Sahara (1884–1975); Andorra

Issuance
- Central bank: Bank of Spain
- Website: www.bde.es
- Printer: Fábrica Nacional de Moneda y Timbre
- Website: www.fnmt.es
- Mint: Fábrica Nacional de Moneda y Timbre
- Website: www.fnmt.es

Valuation
- Inflation: 1.4%
- Source: Cámara Guipúzcoa, 1998

EU Exchange Rate Mechanism (ERM)
- Since: 19 June 1989
- Fixed rate since: 31 December 1998
- Replaced by euro, non cash: 1 January 1999
- Replaced by euro, cash: 1 March 2002
- 1 € =: Pts 166.386
- This infobox shows the latest status before this currency was rendered obsolete.

The peseta (/pəˈseɪtə/, Spanish: [peˈseta]) (Note: Name in other languages of Spain: Aragonese, Asturian and Galician: peseta, IPA [peˈseta]; Basque: pezeta, IPA: [pes̻eta]; Catalan: pesseta, IPA: [pəˈsɛtə]) was the currency of Spain between 1868 and 2002. Along with the French franc, it was also a de facto currency used in Andorra (which had no national currency with legal tender).

== Etymology ==
The name of the currency derives from peceta, a Catalan word meaning little piece, from the Catalan word peça (lit. piece, "coin"). Its etymology has wrongly been attributed to the Spanish peso. The word peseta has been known as early as 1737 to colloquially refer to the coin worth 2 reales provincial or 1/5 of a peso. Coins denominated in "pesetas" were briefly issued in 1808 in Barcelona under French occupation; see Catalan peseta.

== Symbol ==
Traditionally, there was never a single symbol or special character for the Spanish peseta. Common abbreviations were "Pta" (plural: "Pts), "Pt", and "Ptas". A common way of representing amounts of pesetas in print was using superior letters: "P^{ta}" and "P^{ts}".

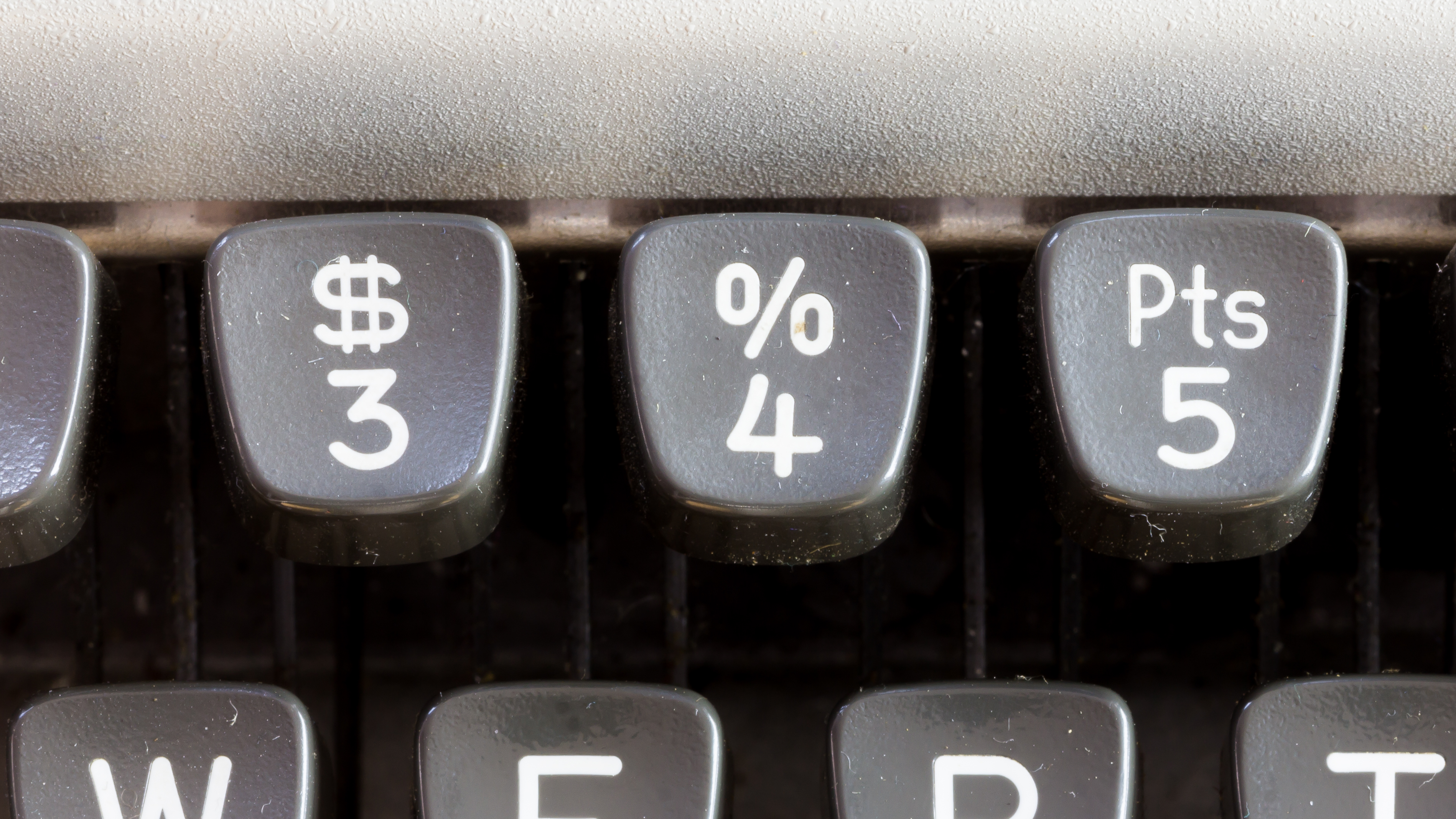
A 1970s AEG Olympia Traveller de Luxe typing machine with the ₧ symbol

Common Spanish models of mechanical typewriters had the expression "Pts" on a single type head, as a shorthand intended to fill a single type space (Pts) in tables instead of three (P+t+s).

Later, Spanish models of IBM electric typewriters also included the same type in its repertoire.

When the first IBM PC was designed in 1980, it included a "peseta symbol" "Pt" in the ROM of the Monochrome Display Adapter (MDA) and Color Graphics Adapter (CGA) video output cards' hardware, with the code number 158. This original character set chart later became the MS-DOS code page 437. Some spreadsheet software for PC under MS-DOS, as Lotus 1-2-3, employed this character as the peseta symbol in their Spanish editions. Subsequent international MS-DOS code pages, like code page 850 and others, deprecated this character in favour of some other national characters.

In order to guarantee the interchange with previous encodings such as code page 437, the international standard Unicode includes this character as U+20A7 PESETA SIGN in its Currency Symbols block. Other than that, the use of the "peseta symbol" standalone is extremely rare, and has been outdated since the adoption of the euro in Spain.

In the version 1.0 of Unicode the character ₧ U+20A7 PESETA SIGN had two reference glyphs: a "Pts" ligature glyph as in IBM code page 437 and an erroneous P with stroke. In Unicode 2.0 the reference glyph P with stroke was erroneously displayed as the only symbol for peseta and was later corrected to the Pts ligature and a separate character code was added for the peso sign.

== Subdivision ==
The peseta was subdivided into 100 céntimos and, informally, into 4 reales, which are the origin of the American quarter. The last coin of any value under one peseta was a 50 cts coin issued in 1980 to celebrate Spain's hosting of the 1982 FIFA World Cup. The last 25-céntimo coin (or real) was dated 1959, the ten céntimos also dated 1959; both coins bore the portrait of Franco. The 1-céntimo coin was last minted in 1913 and featured King Alfonso XIII. The 1/2-céntimo coin was last minted in 1868 and featured Queen Isabel II.

== History ==
Currencies used in Spain before the peseta's introduction in 1868 include:

- The maravedí from the 11th to 15th centuries.
- The original Spanish real (later, real nacional) introduced in the mid-14th century, which from 1497 was fixed at 34 maravedíes. Eight of these reales nacional were equal to the Spanish dollar, or peso, or duro.
- The real provincial, used only in Peninsular Spain and not its colonies, and valued at 1/10 dollar.
- The real de vellón, another version of the real also exclusive to Peninsular Spain, issued prolifically in the 17th and 18th centuries, and valued much less than the above-mentioned reales. In 1737 it was finally fixed at 1/20th dollar. In 1850 it was divided decimally into 10 décimos or 100 céntimos.
- The short-lived silver escudo from 1864 to 1869, worth 1/2 dollar and divided into 10 reales de vellón or 100 céntimos de escudo.

The peseta, previously not a monetary unit but a colloquial name for the coin worth 1/5 of a peso, was formally introduced as a currency unit in 1868, at a time when Spain considered joining the Latin Monetary Union (LMU). Spain eventually decided not to formally join the LMU, although it did achieve alignment with the bloc. The Spanish Law of June 26, 1864 decreed that in preparation for joining the Latin Monetary Union (set up in 1865), the peseta became a subdivision of the Spanish peso with 1 peso duro = 5 pesetas. The peseta replaced all previous currencies denominated in silver escudos and reales de vellón at a rate of 5 pesetas = 1 peso duro = 2 silver escudos = 20 reales de vellón.

The peseta was initially equal to 4.5 grams of silver, or 0.290322 grams of gold, the standard used by all the currencies of the Latin Monetary Union. From 1873, only the gold standard applied.

In 1883 the peseta went off the gold standard and traded below parity with the gold French franc. However, as the free minting of silver was suspended to the general public, the peseta had a floating exchange rate between the value of the gold franc and the silver franc. The Spanish government captured all profits from minting duros (5-peseta coins) out of silver bought for less than Pts 5. While total issuance was limited to prevent the peseta from falling below the silver franc, the abundance of duros in circulation prevented the peseta from returning to par with the gold franc. Spain's system where the silver duro trades at a premium above its metallic value due to relative scarcity is called the fiduciary standard.

The political turbulence of the early twentieth century (especially during the years after World War I) caused the monetary union to break up, although it was not until 1927 that it officially ended.

During the Civil War (1936–1939), gold and silver coinage was withdrawn and copper-nickel coins were introduced. In 1959, Spain became part of the Bretton Woods System, pegging the peseta at a value of Pts 60 = US$1. In 1967, the peseta followed the devaluation of sterling, maintaining the exchange rate of Pts 168 = £1 stg. and establishing a new rate of Pts 70 = US$1.

High inflation was constant in Spain from the Civil War until the 1990s. After one century with the Pts 1,000 being the largest note, the Pts 5,000 note was introduced in 1976. A series of coins was issued to commemorate the 1982 FIFA World Cup held in Spain. All the fractional coinage was withdrawn in 1983; at the same time, Pts 2,000 and Pts 10,000 notes were introduced.

Pts 200 and Pts 500 notes were withdrawn in 1992 and replaced by coins, leaving Pts 1,000 as the smallest note. Coins ranged from Pta 1 to Pts 500. In that year, a series of coins commemorating 1992 Summer Olympics in Barcelona and Expo '92 in Seville were issued. Spain was hit heavily by the early 1990s recession and the peseta was devalued three times, the first of them being just after Black Wednesday, plummeting from Pts 100 to Pts 130 per US$1.

All remaining Franco era coinage was withdrawn in 1997. The peseta linked its value with the euro coin on 1 January 1999, and hit rock bottom that year when Pts 200 were required to buy US$1. At the time Euro became a material coin, Pts 185.29 were needed to buy US$1, that is, 1.1743 euros.

The peseta was replaced by the euro in 2002, following the establishment of the euro in 1999. The exchange rate was €1 = Pts 166.386.

== Coins ==
From 1868 to 1982, a unique dating system for Spanish coins was employed. This would be adopted and sometimes abandoned intermittently during various times, and continued through to be used through the first years of Juan Carlos I's reign. Although a common "authorization date" will be found on virtually all coins of this period on the obverse (front) of each coin, the actual date for many coins can be found inside a small six pointed star, typically on the reverse (back) of each coin, but sometimes the front. Therefore, the obverse date does not always reflect the actual date of mintage but rather a restriking of older obverse coin die designs. So, if the coin date shows 1959 up front but a tiny "64" is depicted in the six pointed star on the back, then the actual date of issue is in fact 1964 rather than the date depicted in front. This dating system would be abandoned in the early 1980s anticipating a one-by-one redesign of each coin denomination.

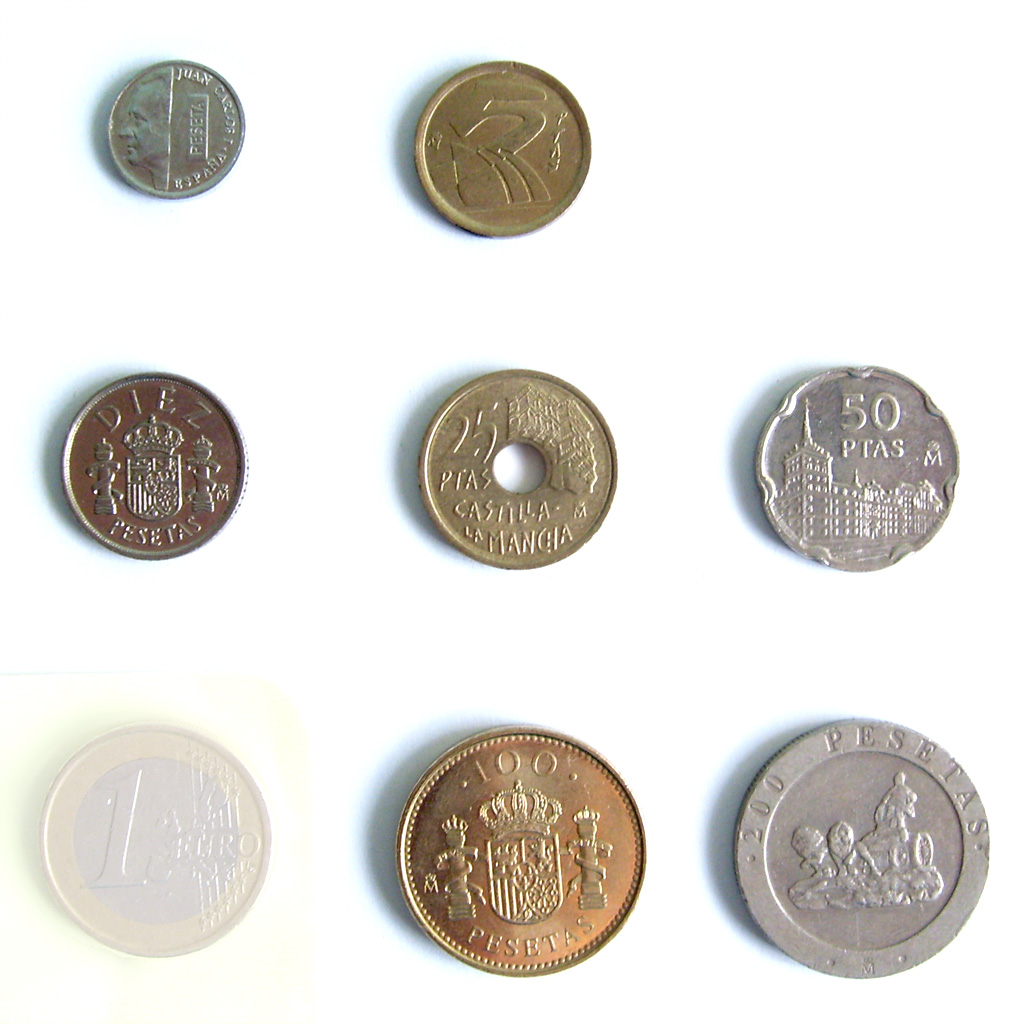
Last editions of peseta coins (lacks Pts 500 coin) and 1-euro coin for size reference

=== Decimal coinage of the monarchy ===
- No coins were issued by the short lived First Republic (1873–1874).

In 1869 and 1870, coins were introduced in denominations of 1, 2, 5, 10, 20, and 50 céntimos, and Pta 1, Pts 2, and Pts 5. The lowest four denominations were struck in copper (replaced by bronze from 1877), with the 20 cts, 50 cts, Pta 1 and Pts 2 struck in .835 silver and the Pts 5 struck in .900 silver. 5 cts and 10 cts coins were quickly nicknamed perra chica (small dog) and perra gorda (fat dog) respectively, as people then were unable to recognize the shape of the lion in them, mistaking it for a dog. The Pts 5 coin was nicknamed duro (hard), referencing the old peso duro. Pts 5 coins were called duros by every generation until the withdrawal of the peseta in 2002, and Spaniards would often informally account in that unit (e.g. using '20 duros' for Pts 100).

Gold Pts 25 coins were introduced in 1876, followed by Pts 10 in 1878. In 1889, Pts 20 coins were introduced, with production of the Pts 25 ceasing. In 1897, a single issue of gold Pts 100 was made. Production of gold coins ceased in 1904, followed by that of silver coins in 1910. The last bronze coins were issued in 1912.

Starting in 1906 a new series of 1 ctm and 2 cts coins were issued in bronze. Due to a number of economic issues these were the only two coins from this series.

Coin production resumed in 1925 with the introduction of cupronickel 25 cts. In 1926, a final issue of silver 50 cts was made, followed by the introduction of a holed version of the 25 cts in 1927.

=== The Second Republic and Civil War period ===
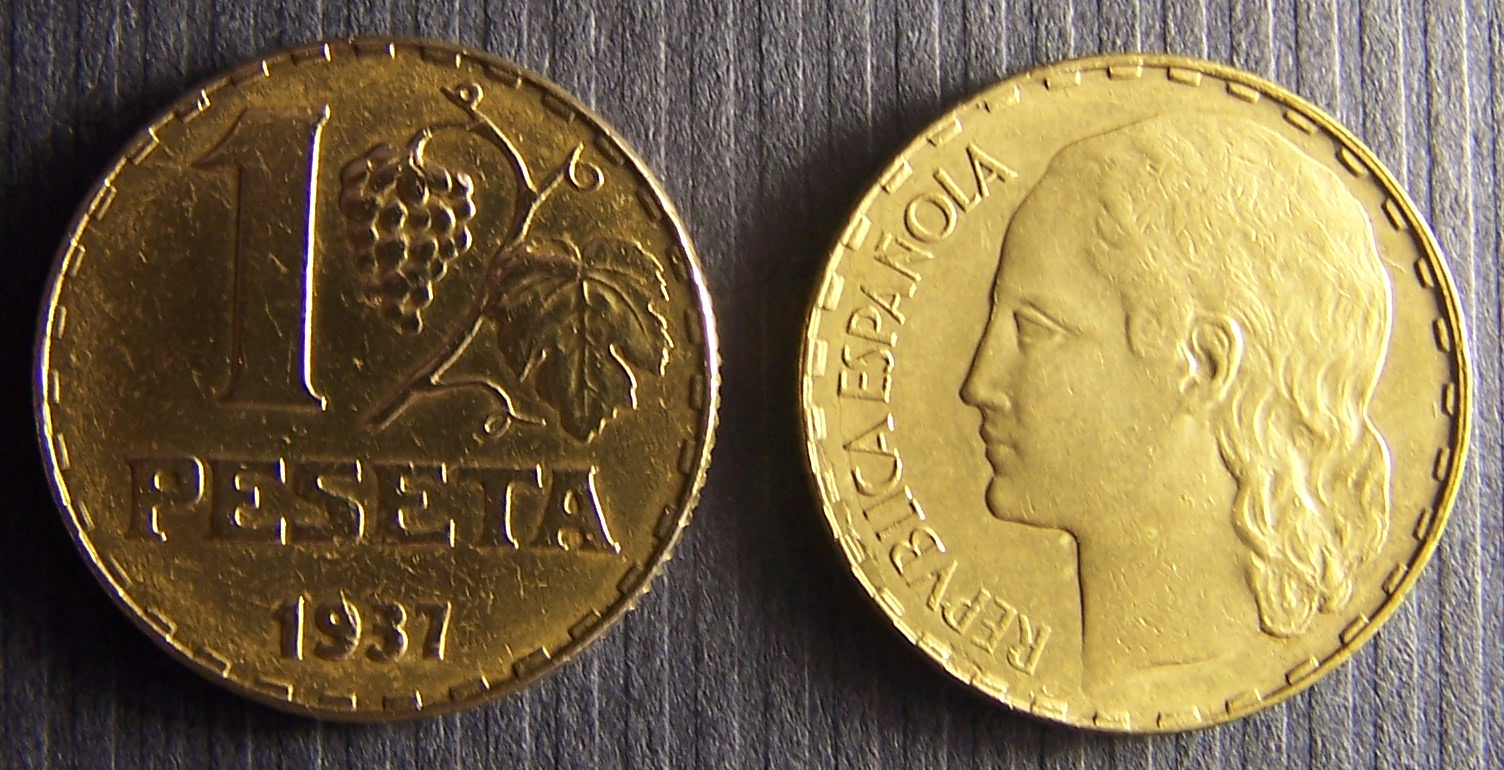
La Rubia, Pta 1 coin from 1937

In 1934, the Second Spanish Republic issued its first coins in the denomination of 25 cts and 50 cts and Pta 1. The 25 cts and silver Pta 1 were the same size and composition as the earlier Royal issues, whilst the 50 cts was struck in copper. In 1937 a 5 cts coin was struck in iron and a new Pta 1 in brass. An iron 10 cts coin was also produced in 1938 but never issued into circulation, unknown whether due to its close resemblance to the 5cts or because the government of issue fell before it could be released. All of these replaced symbols and images related to the monarchy. The brass Pta 1 was sometimes nicknamed La Rubia (The Blonde), as it featured a woman's face in a gold-coloured alloy.

=== Coins of the Nationalist State and World War II periods ===
The Nationalists issued their first official coins in 1937. These were holed 25 cts featuring a rising sun and a clutch of arrows. These coins were minted in Vienna. A smaller copper 25 cts followed in 1938. Following the end of the Civil War in 1939, the victorious Nationalist government introduced aluminium 5 cts and 10 cts in 1940 featuring a conquistador, followed by reduced size aluminium-bronze Pta 1 coins in 1944 featuring the state crest and national symbols.

During the Civil War, a number of local coinages were also issued by both Republican and Nationalist forces. In 1936, the following pieces were issued by the Nationalists:

District	Denominations
Cazalla de Sierra	10 cts
Arahal	50 cts, Pta 1, Pts 2
Lora del Río	25 cts
Marchena	25 cts
La Puebla de Cazalla	10 cts, 25 cts

The following issues were made by Republican forces in 1937:

District	Denominations
Arenys de Mar	50 cts, Pta 1
Asturias and León	50 cts, Pts 1, Pts 2
Euskadi (Basque Country)	Pta 1, Pts 2
Ibi	25 cts, Pta 1
L'Ametlla del Vallès	25, 50 cts, Pta 1
Menorca	5, 10, 25 cts, Pta 1, Pts 2 1/2
Nulles	5 cts, 10 cts, 25 cts, 50 cts, Pta 1
Olot	10 cts
Santander, Palencia and Burgos	50 cts, Pta 1
Segarra de Gaià (currently Santa Coloma de Queralt)	Pta 1

=== Franco-era coinage ===
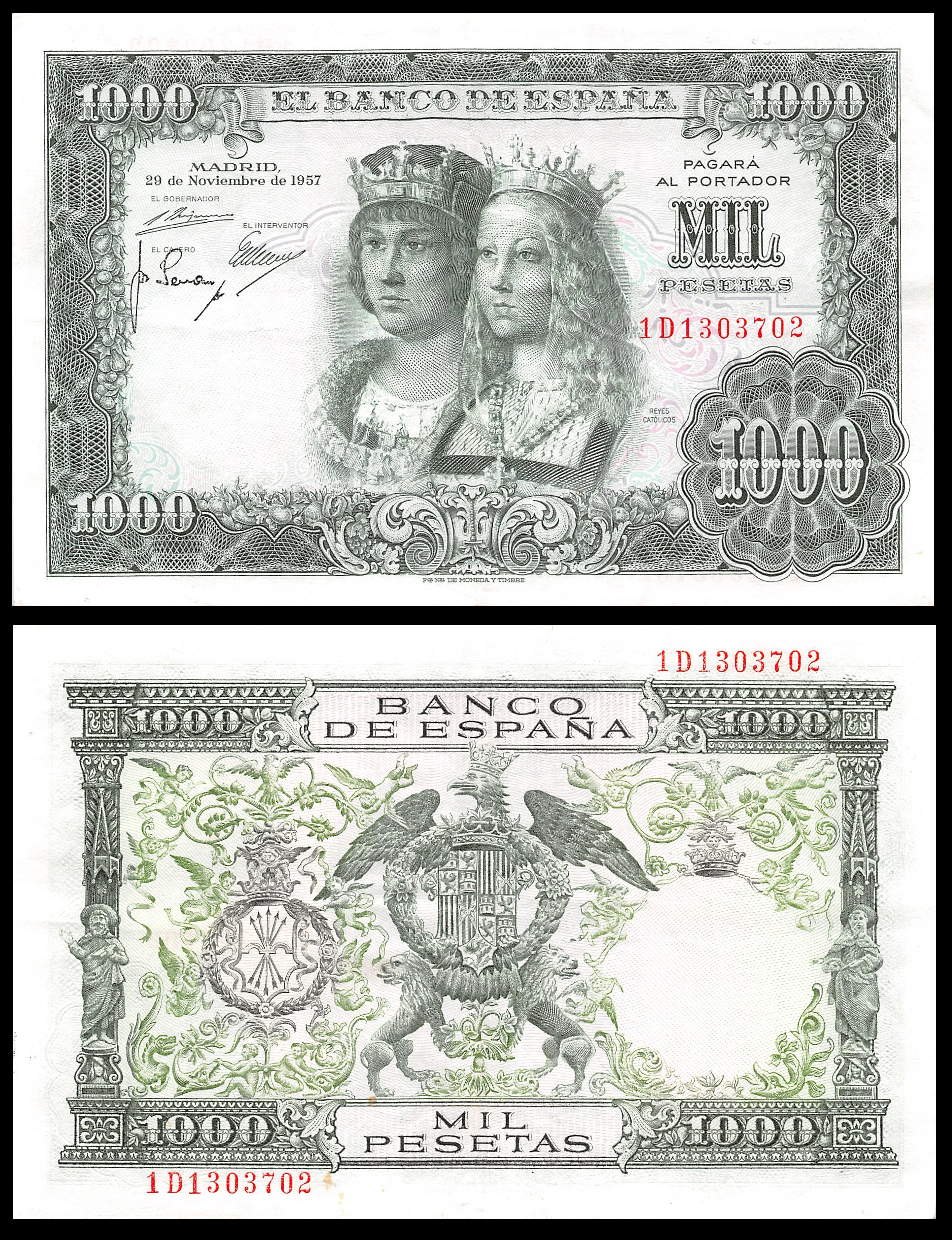
A Pts 1,000 banknote from 1957. The obverse shows Catholic Monarchs while the reverse shows the coat of arms of Spain under the Catholic Monarchs' rule.

The first Pta 1 coins bearing the portrait of Francisco Franco were issued in 1947. Cupro-nickel Pts 5 followed in 1949. In 1949, holed cupro-nickel 50 cts were introduced, followed by aluminium-bronze Pts 2 1/2 in 1954, cupro-nickel Pts 25 and Pts 50 in 1958 and smaller aluminium 10 and 25 céntimos in 1959. Silver Pts 100 were issued between 1966 and 1969, with aluminium 50 céntimos introduced in 1967. In 1966 Franco's profile was redesigned to depict a more recent representation of the dictator.

In the sport of 43-man squamish, developed in 1965 during the Francoist era and well before Spain's transition to the euro, gameplay commences with the toss of "a new Spanish peseta."

=== Restoration of democracy ===
When Juan Carlos became king, there were a few changes: the replacement of Franco's portrait with that of Juan Carlos on the 50 cts and Pta 1 in 1975 and the addition of a cupro-nickel Pts 100 in 1976. 10 cts coins were discontinued. But there were bigger changes to each coin in 1982. Following this redesign the 50 cts was discontinued, and aluminium replaced aluminium bronze in the Pta 1. A Pts 2 coin was also introduced, featuring a map of Spain, though this denomination never became popular. More importantly, nickel-brass Pts 100 were introduced. The redesign centered around the 1982 FIFA World Cup and depicted football-related themes on the Pta 1, Pts 5, Pts 25, Pts 50, and Pts 100. Shortly afterwards, the large cupronickel Pts 100 was replaced by a smaller aluminium bronze coin, which also replaced the 100 ₧ banknote. A cupronickel Pts 10 was introduced in 1983, a denomination that had not been issued for many decades. This preceded a wholesale redesign in all circulating Spanish coins and abandonment of the "star" dating system. Cupronickel Pts 200 coins were introduced in 1986, followed by aluminium bronze Pts 500 in 1987.

In 1989 the biggest changes came. The size of the Pta 1 coin was significantly reduced. The Pts 2 coin was discontinued. Smaller aluminium bronze Pts 5 were introduced, and reduced aluminium bronze Pts 25 were also introduced which had a hole in the centre. Smaller Pts 50 coins were also issued the same year in cupronickel with the distinct Spanish flower shape that would eventually be used by many countries, most notably the 20-cent coin of the euro. At the same time, the Pts 200 coin was made larger and included an identifiable edge with incuse lettering. In 1999, a laser-etched hologram was added to the Pts 500 coin as a security feature to help discourage counterfeiting. During this period, all coins except the Pta 1 and Pts 500 went through a commemorative redesign each year, in a similar vein to the U.S. State commemorative quarters program, until they were discontinued in 2001 before the introduction of the euro common currency.

Until 19 June 2001, the following coins were minted by the Spanish Fábrica Nacional de Moneda y Timbre:

Value	Equivalent in euros (€)	Diameter	Weight	Composition
Pta 1	0.006 (0.01)	14 mm	0.55 g	Aluminium
Pts 5	0.03	17.5 mm	3 g	Aluminum-bronze
Pts 10	0.06	18.5 mm	4 g	Copper-nickel
Pts 25	0.15	19.5 mm	4.25 g	Aluminum-bronze
Pts 50	0.30	20.5 mm	5.60 g	Copper-nickel
Pts 100	0.60	24.5 mm	9.25 g	Aluminum-bronze
Pts 200	1.20	25.5 mm	10.5 g	Copper-nickel
Pts 500	3.01	28 mm	12 g	Aluminum-bronze

The Pts 50 coins issued between 1990 and 2000 were the first that featured the Spanish flower shape.

Spanish flower

=== Spanish euro coins ===
Like all member nations, these coins come in denominations of 1, 2, and 5 cents in copper plated brass, 10, 20, and 50 cents in Nordic gold, and bimetallic 1 and 2 euros with a common reverse design. The obverse of the first three denominations feature Cathedral of Santiago de Compostela, the 10, 20, and 50 cents depict Spanish poet-writer Miguel de Cervantes, and the 1 and 2 euros depict the effigy of King Juan Carlos I or King Felipe VI.

== Banknotes ==
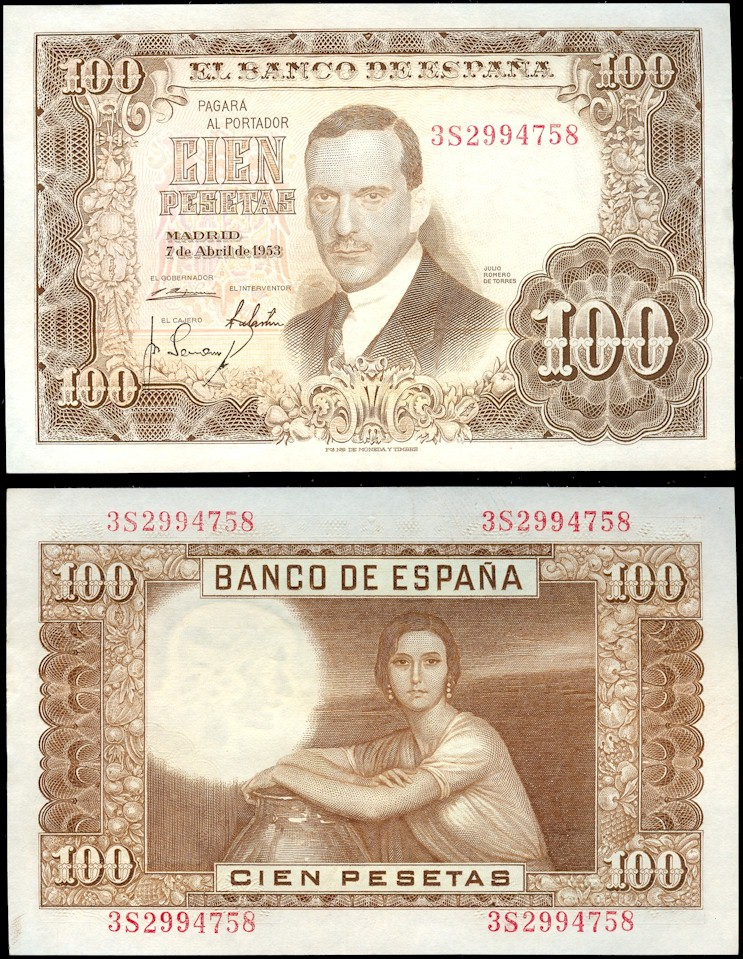
La Fuensanta on the reverse of Pts 100, 1953

In 1874, the Bank of Spain (Banco de España in Spanish) introduced notes for Pts 25, Pts 50, Pts 100, Pts 500 and Pts 1,000. Except for the Pts 250 notes only issued in 1878, the denominations produced by the Central Bank of Spain did not change until the Civil War, when both the Republicans and Nationalists issued Bank of Spain notes.

In 1936, the Republicans issued Pts 5 and Pts 10 notes. The Ministry of Finance (Ministerio de Hacienda) introduced notes for 50 cts, Pta 1 and Pts 2 in 1938, as well as issuing stamp money (consisting of postage or revenue stamps affixed to cardboard discs) in denominations of 5 cts, 10 cts, 15 cts, 20 cts, 25 cts, 30 cts, 40 cts, 45 cts, 50 cts and 60 cts.

The first Nationalist Bank of Spain issues were made in 1936, in denominations of Pts 5, Pts 10, Pts 25, Pts 50, Pts 100, Pts 500, and Pts 1,000. Pta 1 and Pts 2 notes were added in 1937. From the mid-1940s, denominations issued were Pta 1, Pts 5, Pts 25, Pts 50, Pts 100, Pts 500, and Pts 1,000. The Pta 1, Pts 5, Pts 25, and Pts 50 were all replaced by coins by the late 1950s.

In 1978, Pts 5,000 notes were introduced. The Pts 100 note was replaced by a coin in 1982, with Pts 1,000 notes introduced in 1983, Pts 200 in 1984 and Pts 10,000 in 1987. The Pts 200 and Pts 500 notes were replaced by coins in 1986 and 1987.

The penultimate series of banknotes were introduced between 1982 and 1987 and the last series, dedicated to Spanish figures from the exploration of the Americas and introduced in 1992, remained legal tender until the introduction of the Euro.

Penultimate series (1979–1985)
Image	Value	Euro equivalent	Dimensions (mm)	Main colour	Description		Issued from	Lapse
Image	Value	Euro equivalent	Dimensions (mm)	Main colour	Obverse	Reverse	Issued from	Lapse
	200 Pts	€1.20	120 × 65	Orange	Leopoldo Alas	Quercus orocantabrica	16 Sep 1980	30 Jun 2021
	500 Pts	€3.00	129 × 70	Blue	Rosalía de Castro	de Castro's house	23 Oct 1979	30 Jun 2021
	1000 Pts	€6.01	138 × 75	Green	Benito Pérez Galdós	Roque Cinchado	23 Oct 1979	30 Jun 2021
	2000 Pts	€12.02	147 × 80	Red	Juan Ramón Jiménez	Ayuntamiento, Moguer	22 Jul 1980	30 Jun 2021
	5000 Pts	€30.05	156 × 85	Brown	Juan Carlos I	Royal Palace of Madrid	23 Oct 1979	30 Jun 2021
	10000 Pts	€60.10	165 × 85	Grey	Juan Carlos I	Prince Felipe; El Escorial	24 Sep 1985	30 Jun 2021
Spanish Discoveries series (1992) Designer: Reinhold Gerstetter
	1000 Pts	€6.01	130 × 65	Green	Hernán Cortés	Francisco Pizzaro	12 Oct 1992	30 Jun 2021
	2000 Pts	€12.02	138 × 68	Red	José Celestino Mutis	Real Jardín Botánico de Madrid	24 Apr 1992	30 Jun 2021
	5000 Pts	€30.05	146 × 71	Brown	Christopher Colombus	Armillary sphere	12 Oct 1992	30 Jun 2021
	10000 Pts	€60.10	154 × 74	Grey	Juan Carlos I	Jorge Juan y Santacilla	12 Oct 1992	30 Jun 2021
For table standards, see the banknote specification table.

== Andorran peseta ==
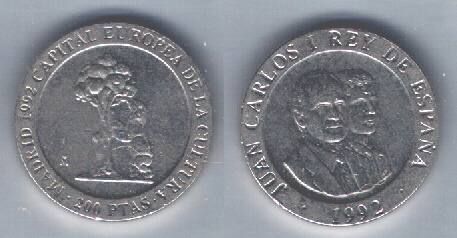
Pts 200 – Madrid European Capital of Culture – 1992

The Andorran peseta (ADP) (pesseta in Catalan) was pegged at 1:1 to the Spanish peseta. Following the outbreak of the Spanish Civil War on 17 July 1936, the Andorran General Council issued Decree No. 112 of 19 December 1936, authorizing the issuance of paper money backed by Spanish banknotes.

There are two issues of Andorran pesetas, known as the Blue issues and the Brown issues. Both issues are dated 19 December 1936 though the Brown issues were not issued until 19 December 1937. Both issues were withdrawn from circulation by 31 December 1938 and replaced with Spanish pesetas. None of the notes are signed.

All notes feature the coat of arms of Andorra on the front, along with text in Catalan indicating the value and issuer. On the back is the serial number and the issuing Decree in Catalan, in full on the Blue issues and in an abbreviated form on the Brown issues. Also on the back of the Brown issues is the coat of arms.

Consell General de les Valls d'Andorra
Issue	Denomination	Description	Size (mm)	# of notes
Blue issue	1 pesseta	Blue and purple	89 x 70	10,000
Blue issue	2 pessetes	Blue and orange	100 x 75	5,000
Blue issue	5 pessetes	Blue and green	122 x 80	4,000
Blue issue	10 pessetes	Blue and green	145 x 80	1,000
Brown issue	50 cèntims	Brown and olive	83 x 63	20,000
Brown issue	1 pesseta	Brown and orange	89 x 70	15,000
Brown issue	2 pessetes	Brown and blue	100 x 75	5,000
Brown issue	5 pessetes	Brown and green	122 x 80	4,000
Brown issue	10 pessetes	Brown and green	145 x 80	2,000

== Replacement by the euro ==
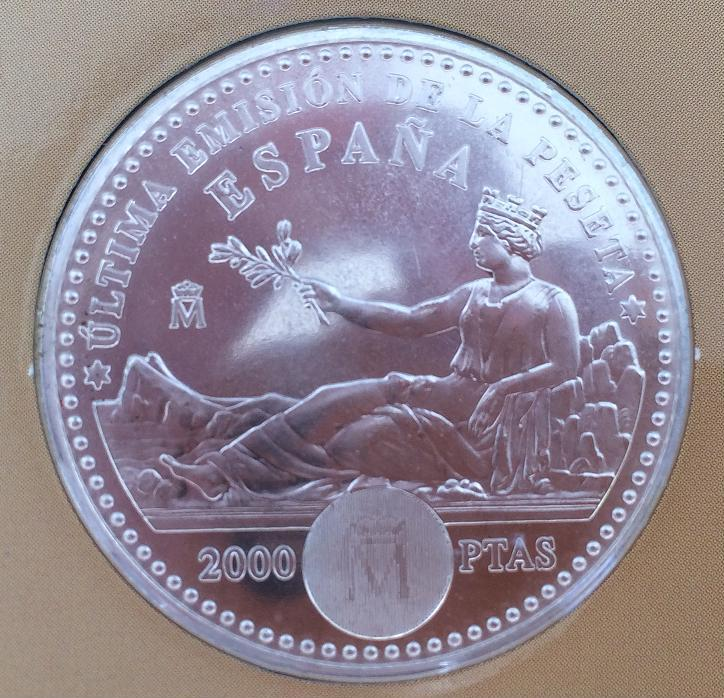
Última peseta - Pts 2,000 circulating commemorative coin

The peseta was replaced by the euro on 1 January 1999 on currency exchange boards. Euro coins and notes were introduced on 1 January 2002, and on 1 March 2002 the peseta lost its legal tender status in Spain, and also in Andorra. The conversion rate was €1 = Pts 166.386.

Peseta notes issued since 1939 and coins that were legal tender on 31 December 2001 remained exchangeable at any branch of the Spanish Central Bank until 30 June 2021. According to that entity, as of March 2011 pesetas to a value estimated at €1.7 billion had not been converted to euros.

== See also ==
- Commemorative coins of Spain
- Currency of Spanish America
- Economy of Spain
- Adoption of the euro in Spain
- Spanish euro coins
- European Union (since 1957)
- Equatorial Guinean peseta
- Latin Union (since 1954)
- Philippine real
- Sahrawi peseta

== Notes ==
1. 1999 by law (on financial markets and business transactions only), two currency units were used (the Spanish peseta still had legal tender on all banknotes, coins and personal bank accounts) until 2002.

== Bibliography ==
- Krause, Chester L.; Clifford Mishler (1991). Standard Catalog of World Coins: 1801–1991 (18th ed.). Krause Publications. ISBN 0873411501.
- Pick, Albert (1994). Bruce, Colin R. II; Shafer, Neil (eds.). Standard Catalog of World Paper Money: General Issues (7th ed.). Krause Publications. ISBN 0-87341-207-9.

Preceded by Spanish escudo	Spanish currency 1868–1999/2002^{1}	Succeeded by Euro
