= Euro gold and silver commemorative coins (Spain) =

Kingdom of Spain Reino de España

This article covers euro gold and silver coins issued by the Royal Spanish Mint. It also covers rare cases of collectors coins (coins not planned for normal circulation) minted using other precious metals. This article however, does not cover either the Spanish €2 commemorative coins or the Spanish peseta commemorative coins.

Other countries' euro gold and silver collections are discussed in the article Euro gold and silver commemorative coins.

== Royal Spanish Mint ==
The Royal Spanish Mint is a public business entity, Its production of the coins takes place in two industrial plants, one in Madrid and the other in Burgos.

== Program ==
=== 2000-peseta ===
Silver 2000-peseta coins have been minted every year since 1994. Each year a €12 silver coin is released to continue this tradition in the new currency. The first of such was in 2002 celebrating Spain's presidency of the E.U.

=== The Iberoamerican Series ===
Each of the participating countries issues a sister coin dedicated to a particular theme. Each coin also depicts the coat of arms of the other countries. The participants are Argentina, Cuba, Ecuador, Guatemala, Mexico, Nicaragua, Paraguay, Peru & Portugal. In 2003 the 5th series was released the theme was "Sailing", this was later followed by the 6th series in 2005 with "Architecture and Monuments" being the theme.

== Future Projection ==
Although not yet approved by the corresponding ministerial orders, the 7th Iberoamerican series has been previewed by the Spanish Mint the theme is to be "Iberian-American countries and Olympic sports".

== 2002 ==
=== Gold ===
World football cup			
Designer: -		Mint: -	
Value: €200	Alloy: Au	Quantity: 4,000	Quality: Proof
Issued: 2002	Diameter: 30 mm	Weight: 13.5 g	Market Value: -
The obverse depicts two football players competing for a ball & the letter "G" The reverse design features a typical boot worn by football players in the game
International Year Gaudi			
Designer: -		Mint: -	
Value: €400	Alloy: Au	Quantity: 3,000	Quality: Proof
Issued: 2002	Diameter: 38 mm	Weight: 27 g	Market Value: -
The obverse depicts Antoni Gaudí The reverse design features the Batlló House

=== Silver ===
1st Centenary of the birth of Luis Cernuda			
Designer: -		Mint: -	
Value: €10	Alloy: Ag	Quantity: 25,000	Quality: Proof
Issued: 2002	Diameter: 40 mm	Weight: 27 g	Market Value: -
The obverse depicts a portrait of his majesty king of Spain Juan Carlos I The reverse design features Luis Cernuda
1st Centenary of the birth of Rafael Alberti			
Designer: -		Mint: -	
Value: €10	Alloy: Ag	Quantity: 25,000	Quality: Proof
Issued: 2002	Diameter: 40 mm	Weight: 27 g	Market Value: -
The obverse depicts a portrait of his majesty king of Spain Juan Carlos I The reverse design features Rafael Alberti
2002 Winter Olympics			
Designer: -		Mint: -	
Value: €10	Alloy: Ag	Quantity: 30,000	Quality: Proof
Issued: 2002	Diameter: 40 mm	Weight: 27 g	Market Value: -
The obverse depicts a portrait of his majesty king of Spain Juan Carlos I The reverse design features a cross-country skier
Incorporation of Minorca under the Spanish Crown			
Designer: -		Mint: -	
Value: €10	Alloy: Ag	Quantity: 30,000	Quality: Proof
Issued: 2002	Diameter: 40 mm	Weight: 27 g	Market Value: -
The obverse depicts a portrait of his majesty king of Spain Juan Carlos & queen Sofia The reverse design features the surrender of Minorca
International Year Gaudi			
Designer: -		Mint: -	
Value: €10	Alloy: Ag	Quantity: 25,000	Quality: Proof
Issued: 2002	Diameter: 40 mm	Weight: 27 g	Market Value: -
The obverse depicts Antoni Gaudí The reverse design features the Guell park
International Year Gaudi			
Designer: -		Mint: -	
Value: €10	Alloy: Ag	Quantity: 25,000	Quality: Proof
Issued: 2002	Diameter: 40 mm	Weight: 27 g	Market Value: -
The obverse depicts Antoni Gaudí The reverse design features the Milá building
International Year Gaudi			
Designer: -		Mint: -	
Value: €10	Alloy: Ag	Quantity: 25,000	Quality: Proof
Issued: 2002	Diameter: 40 mm	Weight: 27 g	Market Value: -
The obverse depicts Antoni Gaudí The reverse design features the Capricho
Spain's Presidency of the EU			
Designer: -		Mint: -	
Value: €10	Alloy: Ag	Quantity: 30,000	Quality: Proof
Issued: 2002	Diameter: 40mm	Weight: 27g	Market Value: -
The obverse depicts a portrait of his majesty king of Spain Juan Carlos I The reverse design features a map depicting the European Union member states
World football cup			
Designer: -		Mint: -	
Value: €10	Alloy: Ag	Quantity: 25,000	Quality: Proof
Issued: 2002	Diameter: 40mm	Weight: 27g	Market Value: -
The obverse depicts a football player taking a shot & the letter "O" The reverse design features a standard football used in the game
World football cup			
Designer: -		Mint: -	
Value: €10	Alloy: Ag	Quantity: 25,000	Quality: Proof
Issued: 2002	Diameter: 40mm	Weight: 27g	Market Value: -
The obverse depicts a goalkeeper diving to protect the goal & the letter "L" The reverse design features a standard goalkeepers glove used in the game
Spain's Presidency of the EU			
Designer: -		Mint: -	
Value: €12	Alloy: Ag	Quantity: 35,000	Quality: Uncirculated
Issued: 2002	Diameter: 33mm	Weight: 18g	Market Value: -
The obverse depicts a portrait of his majesty king of Spain Juan Carlos & queen Sofia The reverse design features the European Union presidency symbol
International Year Gaudi			
Designer: -		Mint: -	
Value: €50	Alloy: Ag	Quantity: 8,000	Quality: Proof
Issued: 2002	Diameter: 73mm	Weight: 168.75g	Market Value: -
The obverse depicts Antoni Gaudí The reverse design features the Sagrada Familia

== 2003 ==
=== Gold ===
FIFA World Cup Germany 2006			
Designer: -		Mint: -	
Value: €100	Alloy: Au	Quantity: 25,000	Quality: Proof
Issued: 2003	Diameter: 23mm	Weight: 6.75g	Market Value: -
The obverse depicts his majesty king of Spain Juan Carlos The reverse design features a goalkeeper kicking a football
25th Anniversary of the Spanish Constitution			
Designer: -		Mint: -	
Value: €200	Alloy: Au	Quantity: 4,000	Quality: Proof
Issued: 2003	Diameter: 30mm	Weight: 13.5g	Market Value: -
The obverse depicts his majesty king of Spain Juan Carlos & queen Sofia The reverse design features the palace of congress
First Anniversary of the Euro			
Designer: -		Mint: -	
Value: €200	Alloy: Au	Quantity: 20,000	Quality: Proof
Issued: 2003	Diameter: 30mm	Weight: 13.5g	Market Value: -
The obverse depicts his majesty king of Spain Juan Carlos & queen Sofia The reverse design features the abduction of Europa

=== Silver ===
10th FINA World Swimming Championship			
Designer: -		Mint: -	
Value: €10	Alloy: Ag	Quantity: 30,000	Quality: Proof
Issued: 2003	Diameter: 40mm	Weight: 27g	Market Value: -
The obverse depicts his majesty king of Spain Juan Carlos The reverse design features a swimmer swimming crawl-style
25th Anniversary of the Spanish Constitution			
Designer: -		Mint: -	
Value: €10	Alloy: Ag	Quantity: 30,000	Quality: Proof
Issued: 2003	Diameter: 40mm	Weight: 27g	Market Value: -
The obverse depicts his majesty king of Spain Juan Carlos & queen Sofia The reverse design features the palace of congress
75th Anniversary of the Training Ship Juan Sebastián de Elcano			
Designer: -		Mint: -	
Value: €10	Alloy: Ag	Quantity: 50,000	Quality: Proof
Issued: 2003	Diameter: 40mm	Weight: 27g	Market Value: -
The obverse depicts his majesty king of Spain Juan Carlos The reverse design features a training ship
FIFA World Cup Germany 2006			
Designer: -		Mint: -	
Value: €10	Alloy: Ag	Quantity: 50,000	Quality: Proof
Issued: 2003	Diameter: 40mm	Weight: 27g	Market Value: -
The obverse depicts his majesty king of Spain Juan Carlos The reverse design features a goalkeeper attempting to block the ball
Fifth Centenary of the birth of Miguel López de Legazpi			
Designer: -		Mint: -	
Value: €10	Alloy: Ag	Quantity: 25,000	Quality: Proof
Issued: 2003	Diameter: 42mm	Weight: 33.62g	Market Value: -
The obverse depicts his majesty king of Spain Juan Carlos The reverse design features Legazpi
Fifth Iberoamerican Series: Sailing			
Designer: -		Mint: -	
Value: €10	Alloy: Ag	Quantity: 12,000	Quality: -
Issued: 2003	Diameter: 40mm	Weight: 27g	Market Value: -
The obverse depicts a 16th-century galleon (ship) The reverse design features the Spanish coat-of-arms surrounded by the participating countries coat-of-arms
First Anniversary of the Euro			
Designer: -		Mint: -	
Value: €10	Alloy: Ag	Quantity: 50,000	Quality: Proof
Issued: 2003	Diameter: 40mm	Weight: 27g	Market Value: -
The obverse depicts his majesty king of Spain Juan Carlos & queen Sofia The reverse design features the rape of Europa
25th Anniversary of the Spanish Constitution			
Designer: -		Mint: -	
Value: €12	Alloy: Ag	Quantity: 20,000	Quality: Uncirculated
Issued: 2003	Diameter: 33mm	Weight: 18g	Market Value: -
The obverse depicts his majesty king of Spain Juan Carlos & queen Sofia The reverse design features the constitutional coat-of-arms
First Anniversary of the Euro			
Designer: -		Mint: -	
Value: €50	Alloy: Ag	Quantity: 20,000	Quality: Proof
Issued: 2003	Diameter: 73mm	Weight: 168.75g	Market Value: -
The obverse depicts his majesty king of Spain Juan Carlos & queen Sofia The reverse design features the constitutional coat-of-arms

== 2004 ==
=== Gold ===
FIFA World Cup Germany 2006			
Designer: -		Mint: -	
Value: €100	Alloy: Au	Quantity: 25,000	Quality: Proof
Issued: 2004	Diameter: 23mm	Weight: 6.75g	Market Value: -
The obverse depicts his majesty king of Spain Juan Carlos I The reverse design features a goalkeepers attempting to save the ball
5th Centenary of Isabella I of Castile			
Designer: -		Mint: -	
Value: €200	Alloy: Au	Quantity: 5,000	Quality: Proof
Issued: 2004	Diameter: 30mm	Weight: 13.5g	Market Value: -
The obverse depicts a reproduction of the 4-excelentes The reverse design features the coat-of-arms of Granada
Enlargement of the European Union			
Designer: -		Mint: -	
Value: €200	Alloy: Au	Quantity: 5,000	Quality: Proof
Issued: 2004	Diameter: 30mm	Weight: 13.5g	Market Value: -
The obverse depicts his majesty king of Spain Juan Carlos I The reverse design features a map of Europe. It also features the names of the new members (Cyprus. Czech Republic. Estonia. Hungary. Latvia. Lithuania. Malta. Poland. Slovakia & Slovenia)
Felipe and Letizia			
Designer: -		Mint: -	
Value: €200	Alloy: Au	Quantity: 30,000	Quality: Proof
Issued: 2004	Diameter: 30mm	Weight: 13.5g	Market Value: -
The obverse depicts his majesty king of Spain Juan Carlos & queen Sofia The reverse design features his royal highness Felipe the prince of Asturias & Letizia
Centenary of the birth of Salvador Dalí			
Designer: -		Mint: -	
Value: €400	Alloy: Au	Quantity: 5,000	Quality: Proof
Issued: 2004	Diameter: 38mm	Weight: 27g	Market Value: -
The obverse depicts Salvador Dalí The reverse design features a design based on the painting "Figure at a window"

=== Silver ===
5th Centenary of Isabella I of Castile			
Designer: -		Mint: -	
Value: €10	Alloy: Ag	Quantity: 20,000	Quality: Proof
Issued: 2004	Diameter: 40mm	Weight: 27g	Market Value: -
The obverse depicts his majesty king of Spain Juan Carlos & queen Sofia The reverse design features Queen Isabella I of Castile
Centenary of the birth of Salvador Dalí			
Designer: -		Mint: -	
Value: €10	Alloy: Ag	Quantity: 25,000	Quality: Proof
Issued: 2004	Diameter: 40mm	Weight: 27g	Market Value: -
The obverse depicts Salvador Dalí The reverse design features a design based on the painting "Atomic Leda"
Centenary of the birth of Salvador Dalí			
Designer: -		Mint: -	
Value: €10	Alloy: Ag	Quantity: 25,000	Quality: Proof
Issued: 2004	Diameter: 40mm	Weight: 27g	Market Value: -
The obverse depicts Salvador Dalí The reverse design features a design based on the work "The great masturbator"
Centenary of the birth of Salvador Dalí			
Designer: -		Mint: -	
Value: €10	Alloy: Ag	Quantity: 25,000	Quality: Proof
Issued: 2004	Diameter: 40mm	Weight: 27g	Market Value: -
The obverse depicts Salvador Dalí The reverse design features a design based on the painting "Soft self-portrait with fried bacon"
Enlargement of the European Union			
Designer: -		Mint: -	
Value: €10	Alloy: Ag	Quantity: 50,000	Quality: Proof
Issued: 2004	Diameter: 40mm	Weight: 27g	Market Value: -
The obverse depicts his majesty king of Spain Juan Carlos I The reverse design features a map of Europe. It also features the names of the new members (Cyprus. Czech Republic. Estonia. Hungary. Latvia. Lithuania. Malta. Poland. Slovakia & Slovenia)
Felipe and Letizia			
Designer: -		Mint: -	
Value: €10	Alloy: Ag	Quantity: 100,000	Quality: Proof
Issued: 2004	Diameter: 40mm	Weight: 27g	Market Value: -
The obverse depicts his majesty king of Spain Juan Carlos & queen Sofia The reverse design features his royal highness Felipe the prince of Asturias & Letizia
FIFA World Cup Germany 2006			
Designer: -		Mint: -	
Value: €10	Alloy: Ag	Quantity: 50,000	Quality: Proof
Issued: 2004	Diameter: 40mm	Weight: 27g	Market Value: -
The obverse depicts his majesty king of Spain Juan Carlos & queen Sofia The reverse design features the net of a football goal and a goalkeepers hand
Holy Year Xacobeo			
Designer: -		Mint: -	
Value: €10	Alloy: Ag	Quantity: 20,000	Quality: -
Issued: 2004	Diameter: 40mm	Weight: 27g	Market Value: -
The obverse depicts his majesty king of Spain Juan Carlos & queen Sofia The reverse design features the Apostle James
Olympic Games Athens			
Designer: -		Mint: -	
Value: €10	Alloy: Ag	Quantity: 30,000	Quality: -
Issued: 2004	Diameter: 40mm	Weight: 27g	Market Value: -
The obverse depicts his majesty king of Spain Juan Carlos I The reverse design features an athlete practicing the hurdle race. It also features a map of the world
5th Centenary of Isabella I of Castile			
Designer: -		Mint: -	
Value: €12	Alloy: Ag	Quantity: 1,500,000	Quality: -
Issued: 2004	Diameter: 33mm	Weight: 18g	Market Value: -
The obverse depicts his majesty king of Spain Juan Carlos & queen Sofia The reverse design features Queen Isabella I of Castile
Felipe and Letizia			
Designer: -		Mint: -	
Value: €12	Alloy: Ag	Quantity: 4,000,000	Quality: -
Issued: 2004	Diameter: 33mm	Weight: 18g	Market Value: -
The obverse depicts his majesty king of Spain Juan Carlos & queen Sofia The reverse design features his royal highness Felipe the prince of Asturias & Letizia
5th Centenary of Isabella I of Castile			
Designer: -		Mint: -	
Value: €50	Alloy: Ag	Quantity: 8,000	Quality: Proof
Issued: 2004	Diameter: 73mm	Weight: 168.75g	Market Value: -
The obverse depicts queen Isabella I of Castile, It also depicts the castle of La Mota The reverse design features part of the painting The surrender of Granada
Centenary of the birth of Salvador Dalí			
Designer: -		Mint: -	
Value: €50	Alloy: Ag	Quantity: 12,000	Quality: Proof
Issued: 2004	Diameter: 38mm	Weight: 27g	Market Value: -
The obverse depicts a design based on the painting "One second before awakening" The reverse design features a design based on the work "Rhinocerotic figure from Phidias's Ilisos"

== 2005 ==
=== Mixed ===
2006 FIFA World Cup Germany			
Designer: -		Mint: -	
Value: €300	Alloy: Au & Ag	Quantity: 8,000	Quality: -
Issued: 2005	Diameter: 40mm	Weight: 17.26g Au & 11.54g Ag	Market Value: -
The obverse depicts a player kicking a ball The reverse features a goalkeepers attempting to save the ball

=== Gold ===
25th Anniversary of the Prince of Asturias Awards			
Designer: -		Mint: -	
Value: €200	Alloy: Au	Quantity: 3,000	Quality: Proof
Issued: 2005	Diameter: 30mm	Weight: 13.5g	Market Value: -
The obverse depicts his royal highness Prince Felipe & the coat-of-arms of the prince of Astrurias foundation The reverse features the facade of the Campoamor theatre
Peace and Freedom			
Designer: -		Mint: -	
Value: €200	Alloy: Au	Quantity: 4,000	Quality: Proof
Issued: 2005	Diameter: 30mm	Weight: 13.5g	Market Value: -
The obverse depicts his majesty king of Spain Juan Carlos I The reverse features two hands shaking. It also features a map of the EU
4th Centenary of the publication of Don Quixote			
Designer: -		Mint: -	
Value: €400	Alloy: Au	Quantity: 3,000	Quality: Proof
Issued: 2005	Diameter: 38mm	Weight: 27g	Market Value: -
The obverse depicts Don Quixote of La Mancha reading The reverse features Don Quixote of La Mancha & Sancho Panza both astride their mounts

=== Silver ===
25th Anniversary of the Prince of Asturias Awards			
Designer: -		Mint: -	
Value: €10	Alloy: Ag	Quantity: 20,000	Quality: Proof
Issued: 2005	Diameter: 40mm	Weight: 27g	Market Value: -
The obverse depicts his royal highness Prince Felipe & the coat-of-arms of the prince of Astrurias foundation The reverse features the facade of the Campoamor theatre
4th Centenary of the publication of Don Quixote			
Designer: -		Mint: -	
Value: €10	Alloy: Ag	Quantity: 18,000	Quality: Proof
Issued: 2005	Diameter: 40mm	Weight: 27g	Market Value: -
The obverse depicts Don Quixote of La Mancha reading The reverse features a design based on the chapter "The adventure of the windmills"
4th Centenary of the publication of Don Quixote			
Designer: -		Mint: -	
Value: €10	Alloy: Ag	Quantity: 18,000	Quality: Proof
Issued: 2005	Diameter: 40mm	Weight: 27g	Market Value: -
The obverse depicts Don Quixote of La Mancha reading The reverse features a design based on the chapter "A battle with Wineskins"
4th Centenary of the publication of Don Quixote			
Designer: -		Mint: -	
Value: €10	Alloy: Ag	Quantity: 18,000	Quality: Proof
Issued: 2005	Diameter: 40mm	Weight: 27g	Market Value: -
The obverse depicts Don Quixote of La Mancha reading The reverse features a design based on the chapter "The coming of Clavileno and the end of this lengthy adventure"
6th Iberian-American Series: Architecture and Monuments			
Designer: -		Mint: -	
Value: €10	Alloy: Ag	Quantity: 12,000	Quality: -
Issued: 2005	Diameter: 40mm	Weight: 27g	Market Value: -
The obverse depicts a facade of the archive of the Indies The reverse features the Spanish coat-of-arms surrounded by the participating countries
Peace and Freedom			
Designer: -		Mint: -	
Value: €10	Alloy: Ag	Quantity: 40,000	Quality: Proof
Issued: 2005	Diameter: 40mm	Weight: 27g	Market Value: -
The obverse depicts his majesty king of Spain Juan Carlos I The reverse features two hands shaking. It also features a map of the EU
The Winter Olympic Games 2006			
Designer: -		Mint: -	
Value: €10	Alloy: Ag	Quantity: 25,000	Quality: Proof
Issued: 2005	Diameter: 40mm	Weight: 27g	Market Value: -
The obverse depicts his majesty king of Spain Juan Carlos I The reverse features a skier in the slalom descent
4th Centenary of the publication of Cervantes Quixote			
Designer: -		Mint: -	
Value: €12	Alloy: Ag	Quantity: 30,000	Quality: -
Issued: 2005	Diameter: 33mm	Weight: 18g	Market Value: -
The obverse depicts his majesty king of Spain Juan Carlos & queen Sofia The reverse features Don Quixote of La Mancha reading
4th Centenary of the publication of Don Quixote			
Designer: -		Mint: -	
Value: €50	Alloy: Ag	Quantity: 12,000	Quality: Proof
Issued: 2005	Diameter: 73mm	Weight: 168.75g	Market Value: -
The obverse depicts Miguel de Cervantes writing The reverse features Don Quixote of La Mancha reading

== 2006 ==
=== Mixed ===
World Basketball Champions - Japan			
Designer: -		Mint: -	
Value: €300	Alloy: Au & Ag	Quantity: 2,006	Quality:
Issued: 2006	Diameter: 40 mm	Weight: 17.26g Au & 11.54g Ag	Market Value: -
The obverse depicts a pair of hands a basketball and basket The reverse features a Spanish basketball player and a basketball

=== Gold ===
Charles V			
Designer: -		Mint: -	
Value: €200	Alloy: Au	Quantity: 3,500	Quality: Proof
Issued: 2006	Diameter: 30 mm	Weight: 13.5 g	Market Value: -
The obverse depicts his majesty king of Spain Juan Carlos I The reverse features the emperor Charles V
Quincentenary Christopher Columbus			
Designer: -		Mint: -	
Value: €400	Alloy: Au	Quantity: 3,000	Quality: Proof
Issued: 2006	Diameter: 38 mm	Weight: 27 g	Market Value: -
The obverse depicts Christopher Columbus & an astrolabe The reverse features Columbus and the Catholic monarchs on their thrones

=== Silver ===
20th Anniversary of the Accession of Portugal and Spain to the European Community			
Designer: -		Mint: -	
Value: €10	Alloy: Ag	Quantity: 12,000	Quality: Proof
Issued: 2006	Diameter: 40 mm	Weight: 27 g	Market Value: -
The obverse depicts his majesty king of Spain Juan Carlos I The reverse features a bridge and a map of the EU
Charles V			
Designer: -		Mint: -	
Value: €10	Alloy: Ag	Quantity: 35,000	Quality: Proof
Issued: 2006	Diameter: 40 mm	Weight: 27 g	Market Value: -
The obverse depicts his majesty king of Spain Juan Carlos I The reverse features the emperor Charles V
Quincentenary Christopher Columbus			
Designer: -		Mint: -	
Value: €10	Alloy: Ag	Quantity: 12,000	Quality: Proof
Issued: 2006	Diameter: 40 mm	Weight: 27 g	Market Value: -
The obverse depicts Christopher Columbus & an astrolabe The reverse features the "Santa Maria" ship
Quincentenary Christopher Columbus			
Designer: -		Mint: -	
Value: €10	Alloy: Ag	Quantity: 12,000	Quality: Proof
Issued: 2006	Diameter: 40 mm	Weight: 27 g	Market Value: -
The obverse depicts Christopher Columbus & an astrolabe The reverse features "The Pinta" caravel
Quincentenary Christopher Columbus			
Designer: -		Mint: -	
Value: €10	Alloy: Ag	Quantity: 12,000	Quality: Proof
Issued: 2006	Diameter: 40 mm	Weight: 27 g	Market Value: -
The obverse depicts Christopher Columbus & an astrolabe The reverse features "The Niña" caravel
World Basketball Champions - Japan			
Designer: -		Mint: -	
Value: €10	Alloy: Ag	Quantity: 15,000	Quality:
Issued: 2006	Diameter: 40 mm	Weight: 27 g	Market Value: -
The obverse depicts his majesty king of Spain Juan Carlos I The reverse features two basketball players a basketball & a basket
Christopher Columbus 5th Centenary			
Designer: -		Mint: -	
Value: €12	Alloy: Ag	Quantity: 20,000	Quality:
Issued: 2006	Diameter: 33 mm	Weight: 18 g	Market Value: -
The obverse depicts his majesty king of Spain Juan Carlos & queen Sofia The reverse features Christopher Columbus
Quincentenary Christopher Columbus			
Designer: -		Mint: -	
Value: €50	Alloy: Ag	Quantity: 6,000	Quality: Proof
Issued: 2006	Diameter: 73 mm	Weight: 168.75 g	Market Value: -
The obverse depicts Christopher Columbus & a part map of America The reverse features Columbus and the land of America

== 2007 ==
=== Gold ===
Year of Spain in China			
Designer: -		Mint: -	
Value: €20	Alloy: Au	Quantity: 15,000	Quality: Proof
Issued: 2007	Diameter: 13.92mm	Weight: 1.24g	Market Value: -
The obverse depicts the constitutional coat-of-arms The reverse features a reproduction of the pillars of Hercules. It also features Chinese characters reading "China Spain"
50th Anniversary of the Treaty of Rome			
Designer: -		Mint: -	
Value: €200	Alloy: Au	Quantity: 3,500	Quality: Proof
Issued: 2007	Diameter: 30mm	Weight: 13.5g	Market Value: -
The obverse depicts his majesty king of Spain Juan Carlos I The reverse features the map of Europe highlighting the six founding members
The Song of My Cid			
Designer: -		Mint: -	
Value: €200	Alloy: Au	Quantity: 3,500	Quality: Proof
Issued: 2007	Diameter: 30mm	Weight: 13.5g	Market Value: -
The obverse depicts the Cid Campeador The reverse features a fragment of "Chronicles of the very idustrious gentleman the Cid Ruy Diaz Campeador"
5th Anniversary of the Euro			
Designer: -		Mint: -	
Value: €400	Alloy: Au	Quantity: 3,000	Quality: Proof
Issued: 2007	Diameter: 38mm	Weight: 27g	Market Value: -
The obverse depicts a 2001 reverse and obverse 1-peseta coin The reverse features a globe containing a map of Europe. It also shows 12 stars

=== Silver ===
50th Anniversary of the Treaty of Rome			
Designer: -		Mint: -	
Value: €10	Alloy: Ag	Quantity: 30,000	Quality: Proof
Issued: 2007	Diameter: 40mm	Weight: 27g	Market Value: -
The obverse depicts his majesty king of Spain Juan Carlos I The reverse features the map of Europe highlighting the six founding members
5th Anniversary of the Euro			
Designer: -		Mint: -	
Value: €10	Alloy: Ag	Quantity: 12,000	Quality: Proof
Issued: 2007	Diameter: 40mm	Weight: 27g	Market Value: -
The obverse depicts a 2001 reverse and obverse 1-peseta coin The reverse features a portal
5th Anniversary of the Euro			
Designer: -		Mint: -	
Value: €10	Alloy: Ag	Quantity: 12,000	Quality: Proof
Issued: 2007	Diameter: 40mm	Weight: 27g	Market Value: -
The obverse depicts a 2001 reverse and obverse 1-peseta coin The reverse features a bridge
5th Anniversary of the Euro			
Designer: -		Mint: -	
Value: €10	Alloy: Ag	Quantity: 12,000	Quality: Proof
Issued: 2007	Diameter: 40mm	Weight: 27g	Market Value: -
The obverse depicts a 2001 reverse and obverse 1-peseta coin The reverse features some windows
Eurobasket			
Designer: -		Mint: -	
Value: €10	Alloy: Ag	Quantity: 12,000	Quality: Proof
Issued: 2007	Diameter: 40mm	Weight: 27g	Market Value: -
The obverse depicts his majesty king of Spain Juan Carlos I The reverse features a basketball player
International Polar Year			
Designer: -		Mint: -	
Value: €10	Alloy: Ag	Quantity: 12,000	Quality: Proof
Issued: 2007	Diameter: 40mm	Weight: 27g	Market Value: -
The obverse depicts his majesty king of Spain Juan Carlos I The reverse features the Oceanographic Research Ship "Hespérides"
The Song of My Cid			
Designer: -		Mint: -	
Value: €10	Alloy: Ag	Quantity: 12,000	Quality: -
Issued: 2007	Diameter: 40mm	Weight: 27g	Market Value: -
The obverse depicts Doña Jimena The reverse features a medieval monk
Year of Spain in China			
Designer: -		Mint: -	
Value: €10	Alloy: Ag	Quantity: 20,000	Quality: -
Issued: 2007	Diameter: 40mm	Weight: 27g	Market Value: -
The obverse depicts his majesty king of Spain Juan Carlos & queen Sofia The reverse features a reproduction of the pillars of Hercules. It also features Chinese characters reading "China Spain"
50th Anniversary of the Treaty of Rome			
Designer: -		Mint: -	
Value: €12	Alloy: Ag	Quantity: -	Quality: Proof
Issued: 2007	Diameter: 33mm	Weight: 18g	Market Value: -
The obverse depicts his majesty king of Spain Juan Carlos & queen Sofia The reverse features a hand with a pen & a silhouette of the Roman Coliseum
5th Anniversary of the Euro			
Designer: -		Mint: -	
Value: €50	Alloy: Ag	Quantity: 5,000	Quality: Proof
Issued: 2007	Diameter: 73mm	Weight: 168.75g	Market Value: -
The obverse depicts "Hispania" with an olive branch in the hand The reverse features the abduction of Europa by Zeus
The Song of My Cid			
Designer: -		Mint: -	
Value: €50	Alloy: Ag	Quantity: 6,000	Quality: -
Issued: 2007	Diameter: 73mm	Weight: 168.75g	Market Value: -
The obverse depicts the Cid Campeador The reverse features medieval musicians & some arches

== 2008 ==
=== Silver ===
Expo Zaragoza.			
Designer:		Mint: -	
Value: €10	Alloy: Silver	Quantity: 25,000	Quality:
Issued: 2008	Diameter: 40 mm	Weight: 27 g	Market Value:
The obverse depicts his majesty king Juan Carlos I. The reverse features the "Torre del Agua" building in Expo Zaragoza.
Expo Zaragoza.			
Designer:		Mint: -	
Value: €10	Alloy: Silver	Quantity: 25,000	Quality:
Issued: 2008	Diameter: 40 mm	Weight: 27 g	Market Value:
The obverse depicts his majesty king Juan Carlos I. The reverse features the "Bridge-Pavilion" a main entrance to Expo Zaragoza.
