= Reggae Sunjam =

- Genre: Reggae, Dub
- Dates: August
- Location: Cyprus
- Years active: 3 years

The Reggae Sunjam Festival is an annual two-day event in Cyprus organized since 2016 by an independent group of reggae enthusiasts. It is held in the first half of August every year and features international and local artists (bands, selectors, dj's and live acts). It is the biggest reggae gathering in Cyprus.

In these first three years of its existence, the festival hosted artists from United Kingdom, Greece, Netherlands, Germany and of course Cyprus.

The festival is a way to bring all the reggae lovers of the island together, especially in a divided island. Greek Cypriots and Turkish Cypriots meet together under the sun and united they send their own message of love and peace.

== Events ==
| Year | Lineup | Date | Location |
|---|---|---|---|
| 2016 | Dub Riots (Reggaewise/Urban Danja Crew), Sensijam, Unity Crew, Dub Thomas (Dubophonic), Alexandros Lontos, Irie Brothers, Suzie Selecta, Pan Khaos (Easy Going Productions), Constantinos (Easy Going Productions), Antreas Kassos | 13-14 Aug | Pomos |
| 2017 | Professor Skank, Syrina Sound, King Of Eye, Jammaroots, Mrs HCN, DJ Monday (Jah Star Sound), Haji Mike & Kemal, Dub Thomas (Dubophonic), Pan Khaos (Easy Going Productions), Suzie Selecta, Constantinos (Easy Going Productions), Chillum Brothers | 12-13 Aug | Pomos |
| 2018 | Blend Mishkin ft. BnC, Hermit Dubz, Supernova, Bunfyah, Selector Red I, Charis, Johnny Blue in Dub, Kyriakos (Cyprus Dub Community), Suzie Selecta, Dub Thomas (Dubophonic), Constantinos ft. MR. S. | 4-5 Aug | Pomos |

== See also ==
- List of reggae festivals
- Reggae
