= Adoption of the euro in Spain =

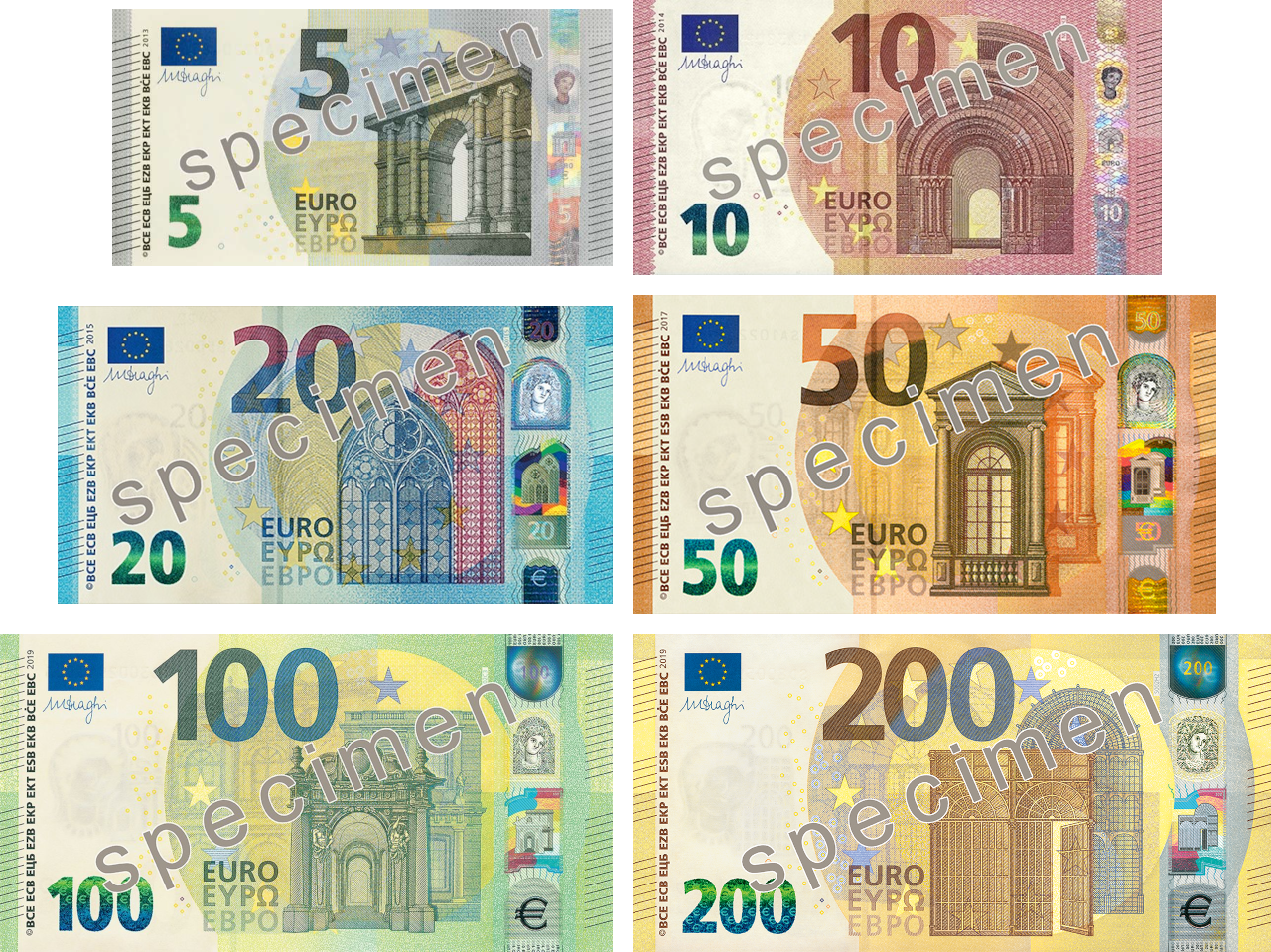
- Euro banknotes - all denominations
- Date: 1 January 2002 (Introduction); 28 February 2002 (Complete Transition)
- Location: Spain
- Type: Economic Transition
- Theme: Adoption of the euro as the national currency
- Outcome: Replacement of the Spanish peseta with the Euro

Eurozone participation European Union member states (special territories not shown) 21 in the eurozone 1 in ERM II, with an opt-out (Denmark) 5 not in ERM II, but committed to join the eurozone after meeting the convergence criteria (Czech Republic, Hungary, Poland, Romania, and Sweden) Non–EU member states 4 using the euro with a monetary agreement (Andorra, Monaco, San Marino, and Vatican City) 2 using the euro unilaterally (Kosovo and Montenegro)

Spain was one of the first countries to adopt the Euro after its introduction in 1999, phasing out its previous national currency, the Spanish peseta, entirely after 1 January 2002.

== History ==
=== Conceptualization of the euro on European level ===
The conceptualization of the euro began in the late 1970s, sparked by the desire for a European response to the dominance of the U.S. dollar. German Chancellor Helmut Schmidt and French President Valéry Giscard d’Estaing played pivotal roles in this development. Initially, the euro served as an accounting unit for international transactions, known as the ECU, before evolving into a common currency.

=== Process of euro adoption in Spain ===
The euro officially came into existence on 1 January 1999, as part of efforts to create an economic and monetary union within the European Union. Spain was one of the first countries to adopt the euro, with the Spanish peseta ceasing to be legal tender after 31 December 2001.

The transition process to the euro in Spain involved a three-year period, starting from 1 January 1999, during which the euro existed as "book money". Euro banknotes and coins were introduced on 1 January 2002. The dual circulation period, when both the Spanish peseta and the euro had legal tender status, ended on 28 February 2002. The government of Spain replacing the Spanish peseta at a fixed conversion rate of 166.386 ESP per one euro. Spanish government and financial institutions undertook extensive efforts to ensure a seamless transition to the Euro. This included the modification of financial software, recalibration of ATMs, and widespread distribution of new euro banknotes and coins. Also, in an effort to facilitate the changeover of the former Spanish national currency, deadlines were set for people to exchange their pesetas for euro: up to 30 June 2002 at the Banco de España and high-street banks, and subsequently only at the Banco de España. The final deadline for exchanging pesetas for euro was 30 June 2021.

== See also ==
- 1986 enlargement of the European Communities
- Spanish euro coins
- Spanish peseta
- Enlargement of the eurozone
- International status and usage of the euro
- Economic and monetary union
- History of the euro
- European Currency Unit
- European Central Bank
- European Union
- European Economic Community
- History of Spain
