= Idol of Pomos =

30th-century BC sculpture from Cyprus

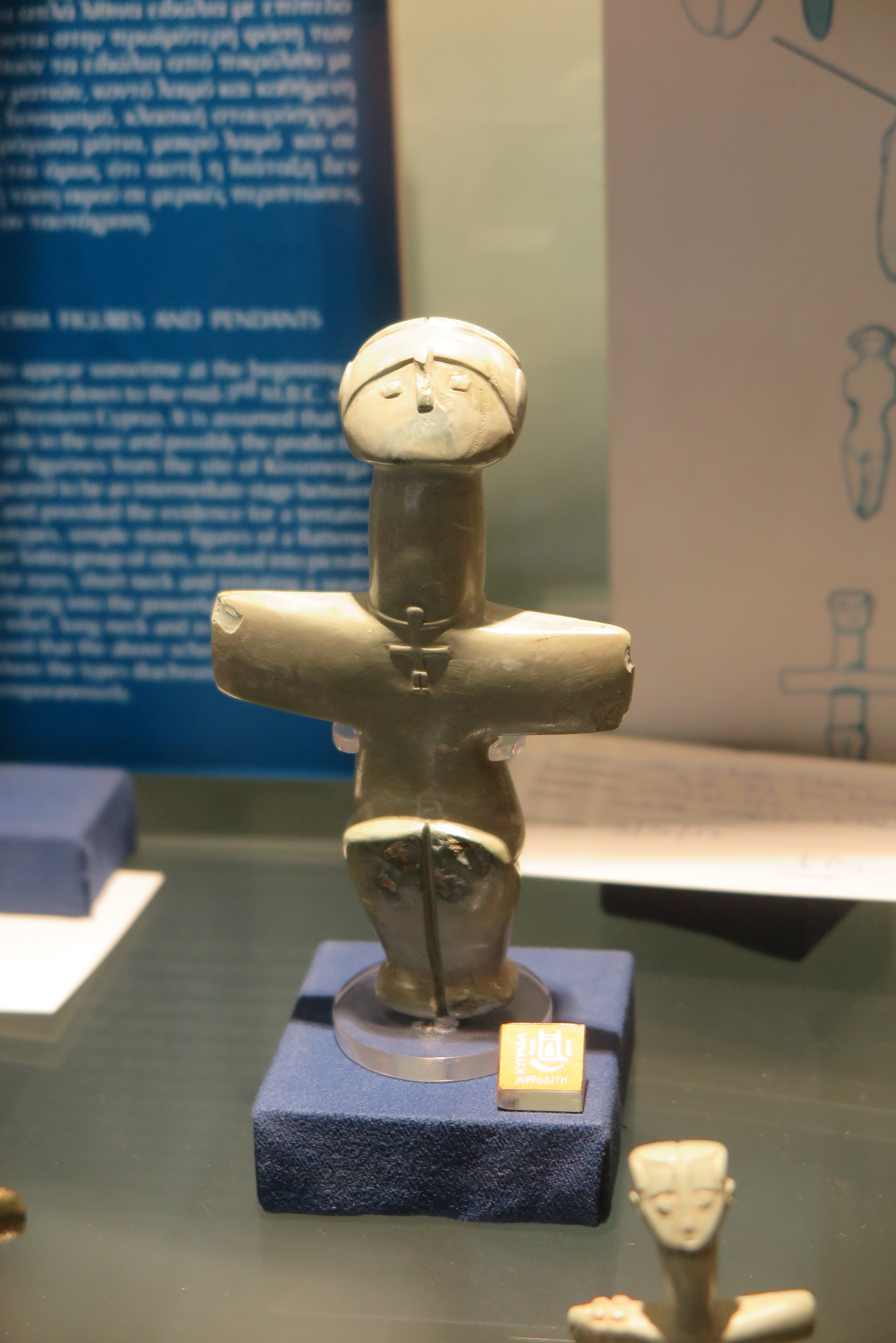
The Idol of Pomos

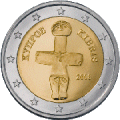
Idol of Pomos depicted on Cypriot € 2 coin

The Idol of Pomos is a stone prehistoric sculpture found near the Cypriot village of Pomos. It dates back to the Chalcolithic period, circa the 30th century BC.

The sculpture is on display in the Cyprus Museum in Lefkosia (Nicosia).

== Symbolism ==
The sculpture probably represents a woman crouching with her arms spread. The gender is assumed from many similar sculptures found in Cyprus with small protrusions on their chests to indicate the female gender. These figurines were probably used as a fertility symbol. Bleda During, however, suggests that these figurines represent a sort of dance. Smaller versions were worn as amulets around the neck, just as this idol wears (a small copy of) itself.

== Euro ==
In 2008 Cyprus adopted the euro as its currency. The idol, a representation of Cypriot prehistoric art, was chosen to be displayed on the Cypriot euro coins of 1 and 2 euro.
