= 1 euro coin =

Coin with a value of one euro

1 euro
- Eurozone (mainly) and other countries
- Value: 1 euro
- Mass: 7.5 g
- Diameter: 23.25 mm
- Thickness: 2.33 mm
- Edge: Alternating segments, three smooth, three finely ribbed
- Composition: Outer segment: nickel brass. Inner segment: three layers: copper-nickel, nickel and copper-nickel.
- Years of minting: 1999–present

Obverse
- Design: Numerous variations, see below.
- Designer: Various
- Design date: Various

Reverse
- Design: Map of Europe with the denomination shown in Latin characters
- Designer: Luc Luycx
- Design date: 2007
- Design: Map of the 15 EU countries of 1999 with the denomination shown in Latin characters
- Designer: Luc Luycx
- Design date: 1999
- Design discontinued: 2007 (still in circulation as of 2025)

The 1 euro coin (€1) is a euro coin with a value of one euro. It is made of two alloys: the inner part of cupronickel, the outer part of nickel brass. All coins have a common reverse side and country-specific national sides. The coin has been used since 2002, with the present common side design dating from 2007.

As of July 2019, there were approximately 7.5 billion one-euro coins in circulation, constituting 25.3% of all circulated euro coins by value and 5.6% by quantity.

== History ==
The coin dates from 2002, when euro coins and banknotes were introduced in the then 12-member eurozone and its related territories. Despite this, the coins of some countries were issued beginning in 1999. The common side was designed by Luc Luycx, a Belgian artist who won a Europe-wide competition to design the new coins. The design of the one and two euro coins was intended to show the European Union (EU) as a whole with the then 15 countries more closely joined together than on the 10- to 50-cent coins (the 1- to 5-cent coins showed the EU as one, though intending to show its place in the world).

The national sides, then 15 (eurozone and Monaco, San Marino and the Vatican who could mint their own), were each designed according to national competitions, though to specifications which applied to all coins such as the requirement of including twelve stars (see euro coins for more). National designs were not allowed to change until the end of 2008, unless a monarch (whose portrait usually appears on the coins) died or abdicated. This happened in Monaco and the Vatican City resulting in three new designs in circulation (the Vatican had an interim sede vacante design until the new Pope was elected). However, starting in 2007, some national designs underwent minor changes due to regulations requiring national designs to meet a series of specifications.

As the EU's membership has since expanded in 2004 and 2007, with further expansions envisaged, the common face of all euro coins of values of 10 cents and above were redesigned in 2007 to show a new map. This map showed Europe, not just the EU, as one continuous landmass; however Cyprus was moved west as the map cut off after the Bosphorus (which was seen as excluding Turkey for political reasons). The 2007 redesign coincided with the first enlargement of the eurozone in that year, with the entry of Slovenia. Hence, the Slovenian design was added to the designs in circulation. Since then designs for Cyprus, Malta, Slovakia, Estonia, Latvia, Lithuania, and Croatia have been added as each of these states joined the eurozone. Andorra began minting its own designs in 2014 after winning the right to do so.

== Design ==
Edge of all €1 coins

The coins are composed of two alloys. The inner circle is composed of three layers (copper-nickel, nickel, copper-nickel) and the outer ring of nickel brass, giving the coin a two-colour appearance. The coin has a diameter of 23.25 mm, thickness 2.33 mm and a mass of 7.5 grams. The coins' edges consist of alternating segments: three smooth, three finely ribbed. The coins have been used from 2002, though some are dated 1999, which is the year the euro was created as a currency, but not put into general circulation.

=== Reverse (common) side ===
The reverse was designed by Luc Luycx and displays a map of Europe, not including Iceland and cutting off, in a semicircle, at the Bosphorus, north through the middle of Ukraine, then Russia and through northern Scandinavia. Cyprus is located further west than it should be and Malta is shown disproportionately large so that it appears on the map. The map has numerous indentations giving an appearance of topography rather than a flat design. Six fine lines cut across the map except where there is landmass and have a star at each end — reflecting the twelve stars on the flag of Europe. Across the map is the word EURO, and a large number 1 appears to the left hand side of the coin. The designer's initials, LL, appear next to Cyprus.

In 2007, the map was updated to reflect the EU's enlargements in 2004 and 2007. Other than depicting the newly added countries, the new design was much the same. The map was less detailed and showed no national borders. The vertical lines running across the rightmost third of the coin are interrupted in the middle to make way for eastern Europe.

=== Obverse (national) side ===
The obverse side of the coin depends on the issuing country. All have to include the name or an abbreviation of the issuing country. The national side of circulation coins shall bear a circle of 12 stars that shall fully surround the national design, including the year mark and the indication of the issuing Member State’s name. The side cannot repeat the denomination of the coin unless the issuing country uses an alphabet other than Latin. Currently, Greece, Cyprus and Bulgaria are the only such countries. Greece engraves "1 ΕΥΡΩ" (1 euro) on its coins and Bulgaria engraves "ЕВРО" (euro). Austria ignores this rule, engraving "1 EURO" on its coins, hence will have to change its design to comply this rule.

Belgium, Finland, France, the Netherlands and Spain minted coins dated 1999, 2000 and 2001 although these entered circulation in 2002. Monaco minted coins dated 2001 although these entered circulation in 2002 too.

State	Details	Years of minting (years shown)	Image
(Andorra) Andorran euro coins	The Casa de la Vall, the home of the General Council of Andorra. It features the word "Andorra" below and the year of minting.	2014 onwards	
(Austria) Austrian euro coins	Wolfgang Amadeus Mozart (with his signature), a famous Austrian composer, in reference to the idea of Austria as a "land of music". The Austrian flag is hatched below the denomination (which is against the new rules for national designs and hence will be changed at some point) on the right hand side. The year appears on the left-hand side.	2002 onwards	
(Belgium) Belgian euro coins	FIRST SERIES: An effigy of King Albert II. To the right-hand side among the stars was the kings monogram, a letter "A", underneath a crown. The year is lower down, also among the stars.	1999–2007	
(Belgium) Belgian euro coins	SECOND SERIES: A redesign to include the letters BE (standing for Belgium) beneath the monogram, which was moved out of the stars into the centre circle but still to the right of the King's renewed portrait. The date was also moved out and placed beneath the effigy and included two symbols either side (left: signature mark of the master of the mint, right: mint mark). This portrait did not comply with previous decisions by the ECOFIN in 2005 and 2008. Therefore, an amendment was made in 2009, which reverted to the portrait of Albert II found in the first series. Mint marks, year and stars remained the same.	2008–2013	
(Belgium) Belgian euro coins	THIRD SERIES: In 2013, Albert II abdicated with Philippe of Belgium becoming King. He subsequently replaced Albert on Belgian coins.	2014 onwards	
(Bulgaria) Bulgarian euro coins	Ivan of Rila, the patron saint of Bulgaria and founder of the Rila Monastery. He is shown holding a cross and a scroll. The design includes the year of issuance, the inscription “БЪЛГАРИЯ” (the country’s name in Bulgarian) and the word “ЕВРО” (“EURO”) in Cyrillic script.	2026 onwards	
(Croatia) Croatian euro coins	Silhouette design of a marten with a checkerboard in the background, and the word "Hrvatska" ("Croatia") written along the edge.	2023 onwards	
(Cyprus) Cypriot euro coins	Idol of Pomos, a prehistoric sculpture dating from the 30th century BC, is an example of the island's historic civilisation and art. It includes the name of Cyprus in Greek and Turkish (ΚΥΠΡΟΣ and KIBRIS) each side of the idol.	2008 onwards	
(Estonia) Estonian euro coins	A geographical image of Estonia and the word "Eesti" ("Estonia").	2011 onwards	
(Finland) Finnish euro coins	Two whooper swans (the national bird of Finland) flying over Finnish landscape, the date is visible in the landscape to the lower right. The coin was designed by Pertti Mäkinen and commemorates the 80th anniversary of the independence of Finland. The first series included the initial of the mint master of the Mint of Finland, Raimo Makkonen (an M), to the left side of the horizon. In 2007, the initial was replaced by the mint's mint mark and the letters FI (for Finland) were included on the right hand side of the horizon. Finland again amended the design of its coins in the 2008 issue, repositioning the mint mark and putting it on the inside of the coin.	1999 onwards	
(France) French euro coins	A stylised tree (which symbolises life, continuity and growth) upon a hexagon (l'hexagone is often used to refer to France due to its broadly hexagonal shape). The letters RF, standing for République française (French Republic), stand each side of the trunk of the tree. Around the edge, but inside the circle of stars, is the motto of France: "liberté, égalité, fraternité". The stars themselves are stylised, linked together by a pattern of lines. The date is located towards the bottom between the stars and the mint marks are located at the top.	1999–2021	
(France) French euro coins	SECOND SERIES: The design features oak and olive branches that form the tree of life and symbolise strength, solidity and peace. The tree and the motto stand within a hexagon.	2022 onwards	
(Germany) German euro coins	The German coat of arms (the German eagle) which symbolises German sovereignty. The date appears at the base of the eagle and the gold behind the stars is etched to give visual effect.	2002 onwards	
(Greece) Greek euro coins	Based on a 5th-century BC four-drachma coin from Athens. The coin is of an owl (a symbol of Athens) with an olive branch to the top left. The outline of the old coin is still shown and the value of the euro in the Greek alphabet, 1 ΕΥΡΩ, is shown on the right-hand side. The mint's mark is to the top and the date on the bottom side among the stars.	2002 onwards	
(Republic of Ireland) Irish euro coins	The national emblem of Ireland, an Irish harp (the Cláirseach). Vertically on the left-hand side is the word "Éire" ("Ireland" in the Irish language) and on the right-hand side is the date. The harp motif was designed by Jarlath Hayes.	2002 onwards	
(Italy) Italian euro coins	The 15th-century "Vitruvian Man" drawing by Leonardo da Vinci which depicted the ideal proportions of a human body. Leonardo's work is highly symbolic as it represents the Renaissance focus on man as the measure of all things, and has simultaneously a round shape that fits the coin perfectly. As Carlo Azeglio Ciampi observed, this represents the "coin to the service of Man", instead of Man to the service of money. It includes the interconnected letters IR (for Repubblica Italiana – Italian Republic). The year is to the right of the human body and the mint mark to the left.	2002 onwards	
(Latvia) Latvian euro coins	The Latvian maiden with "Latvijas Republika" written either side.	2014 onwards	
(Lithuania) Lithuanian euro coins	Vytis (symbol of the coat of arms) and the word "Lietuva", which means "Lithuania". The twelve stars, symbols of the EU, surrounds the Vytis.	2015 onwards	
(Luxembourg) Luxembourgish euro coins	FIRST SERIES: A stylised effigy of Grand Duke Henri of Luxembourg. The left 40% of the coin has the effigy cut off and the style of the stars inverted. The year, followed by "LËTZEBUERG" (Luxembourg in Luxembourgish) written vertically.	2002–2025	
(Luxembourg) Luxembourgish euro coins	SECOND SERIES: On the right, the effigy of Grand Duke Guillaume looking towards the left. Facing the effigy is the inscription of the issuing country "LËTZEBUERG" in a vertical reading. A stylised partial representation of the Luxembourg Lion is depicted at the left of the inner part of the coin.	2026 onwards	
(Malta) Maltese euro coins	The Maltese Cross (the emblem of the Sovereign Military Order of Malta: 1520–1798, now a national symbol), with the background of a darker hatched texture. The word MALTA is shown with each letter appearing in a segment across the top half of the coin to the edge of the inner circle. The date is shown at the base of the inner circle.	2008 onwards	
(Monaco) Monégasque euro coins	FIRST SERIES: Effigies of both Prince Rainier III (monarch) and Prince Albert II (next in line). The name MONACO was written across the top of the coin and the year across the bottom with the mint marks.	2001–2005	
(Monaco) Monégasque euro coins	SECOND SERIES: Upon the death of Prince Rainier III in 2005, and the accession of Prince Albert II, the coin design was changed to just show the effigy of Prince Albert II. The rest of the design stayed the same except for the name Monaco and the date moving within the inner circle.	2006–2024	
(Monaco) Monégasque euro coins	THIRD SERIES: The coin shows a more contemporary representation, along with symbolic elements to represent the Grimaldi family.	2025 onwards	
(Netherlands) Dutch euro coins	FIRST SERIES: A stylised profile of Queen Beatrix of the Netherlands over the left half of the coin, with the right hand side containing the words "Beatrix Koningin der Nederlanden" ("Beatrix Queen of The Netherlands" in Dutch) written vertically on three lines and the year written horizontally to the lower right. This design was taken from the former Dutch guilder. The mint marks are located on the bottom of the outer ring and the twelve stars are compressed onto the left side of the coin only, rather than forming a full circle.	1999–2013	
(Netherlands) Dutch euro coins	SECOND SERIES: In 2013 Willem-Alexander of the Netherlands acceded to the Dutch throne. New coins with his effigy are being minted from 2014 which maintain a similar design.	2014 onwards	
(Portugal) Portuguese euro coins	The royal seal of 1144 surrounded by the country's castles and five escutcheona with silver bezants set in relation to the surrounding European stars which is supposed to symbolise dialogue, exchange of values and dynamics in the building of Europe. Between the castles is the numbers of the year towards the bottom and the letters of the name Portugal between the upper icons. The stars are inset on a ridge.	2002 onwards	
(San Marino) Sammarinese euro coins	FIRST SERIES: The coat of arms of San Marino. The date is located to the top left and the mint mark to the top right. San Marino is written along the bottom of the coat of arms.	2002–2016	
(San Marino) Sammarinese euro coins	SECOND SERIES: The Second Tower.	2017 onwards	
(Slovakia) Slovak euro coins	The Coat of arms of Slovakia, a double cross on three hills extending across the lower three stars. The background is a relief of rocks, representing the stability and strength of Slovakia. "SLOVENSKO" (Slovakia) is written to the right of the emblem and the date to the lower left. The designer's initials appear under the right branch of the cross, and the mint mark under the left branch.	2009 onwards	
(Slovenia) Slovenian euro coins	The coin contains a portrait of Primož Trubar, a Protestant reformer and author of the first book written in Slovene. Around the portrait are the words "Stati inu obstati" (to stand and withstand) and the letters of the name SLOVENIJA (Slovenia) are placed between the stars on the right-hand side. On the left-hand side the date is located between the stars and the mint mark is next to the bottom star; however, it has changed several times since 2007.	2007 onwards	
(Spain) Spanish euro coins	FIRST SERIES: An effigy of King Juan Carlos I designed by Luis José Díaz. To his left on a curved raised area is the name "España" (Spain) and four stars on the right-hand size are on a raise area in the same manner. The mint mark is located beneath España and the date on the lower portion between the stars.	1999–2009	
(Spain) Spanish euro coins	SECOND SERIES: The second design removed the curved raised area for the country's name and the stars, and moving the date from the outer ring of the coin.	2010–2014	
(Spain) Spanish euro coins	THIRD SERIES: In 2014, Juan Carlos I of Spain abdicated in favour of his son Felipe VI. In June 2014 the coronation took place and 8 months later (February 2015) the new design was released.	2015 onwards	
(Vatican City) Vatican euro coins	FIRST SERIES: An effigy of Pope John Paul II. The name CITTA DEL VATICANO (Vatican City), followed by the year and mint mark, was written in a break between the stars below.	2002–2005	
(Vatican City) Vatican euro coins	SECOND SERIES: Following the death of John Paul II in 2005, a new coin was issued during the Sede vacante until a new Pope was chosen. This contained the insignia of the Apostolic Chamber and the coat of arms of the Cardinal Chamberlain.	2005	
(Vatican City) Vatican euro coins	THIRD SERIES: When Pope Benedict XVI was elected, his effigy appeared on the coins, with the name of the city now broken to his top right with the year and mint mark in the middle to his right.	2006–2013	
(Vatican City) Vatican euro coins	FOURTH SERIES: In 2014 the coins were updated with the election of Pope Francis. CITTA DEL VATICANO is written around the top, broken by Pope Francis's head, with the date below the O in Vaticano.	2014–2016	
(Vatican City) Vatican euro coins	FIFTH SERIES: After the announcement that Pope Francis would not appear on any coins issued by the Vatican, a new 1-euro coin was issued depicting the papal coat of arms of Francis.	2017–2025	
(Vatican City) Vatican euro coins	SIXTH SERIES: Effigy of Leo XIV.	2026 onwards	

==== Potential designs ====
Austria, Germany and Greece will also at some point need to update their designs to comply with guidelines stating they must include the issuing state's name or initial, and not repeat the denomination of the coin (Austria only). On the other hand, Slovenia and Greece have to comply with the star rule.

In addition, there are several EU states that have not yet adopted the euro, some of them have already agreed upon their coin designs; however, it is not known exactly when they will adopt the currency, and hence these are not yet minted. See enlargement of the Eurozone for expected entry dates of these countries.

==== Minting ====
One-euro coins have been minted every year since 1999 in Belgium, Finland, France, the Netherlands and Spain. In Austria, Germany, Greece, Ireland, Italy, Luxembourg, Portugal, San Marino and the Vatican City no €1 coins were minted dated 1999, 2000 and 2001. In Monaco, no €1 coins were minted in 1999, 2000, 2005, 2008 and 2010. Malta did not issue €1 coins in 2009. Slovenia and Slovakia have produced coins every year since their respective entries to the eurozone.

Proof €1 coins are minted by the majority, but not all, of the eurozone states.

One of the most valuable planned issues of a €1 coin was by Vatican City in 2002, which may sell for several hundred euro. However, the French mint marks were mistakenly not placed on some 2007 Monaco coins which are hence worth more than €200 to collectors.

Country	Issues BU/PP	1999		2000		2001		2002		2003		2004		2005		2006		2007		2008		2009		2010		2011		2012		2013		2014		2015	
Country	Issues BU/PP	BU	PP	BU	PP	BU	PP	BU	PP	BU	PP	BU	PP	BU	PP	BU	PP	BU	PP	BU	PP	BU	PP	BU	PP	BU	PP	BU	PP	BU	PP	BU	PP	BU	PP
Andorra	1/0																																		
Austria	14/14																																		
Belgium	17/17																																		
Cyprus	7/0																																		
Estonia	4/1																																		
Finland	16/16																																		
France	16/16																																		
Germany	80/80							5	5	5	5	5	5	5	5	5	5	5	5	5	5	5	5	5	5	5	5	5	5	5	5	5	5		
Greece	14/4							2																											
Ireland	13/4																																		
Italy	13/12																																		
Latvia	2/1																																		
Lithuania	1/1																																		
Luxembourg	13/13																																		
Malta	5/0																																		
Monaco	9/3																																		
Netherlands	16/16																																		
Portugal	13/13																																		
San Marino	13/7																																		
Slovenia	8/6																																		
Slovakia	6/6																																		
Spain	17/12																																		
Vatican City	14/13													2																					
Total (388)	312/255	5	4	5	4	6	5	20	14	19	15	18	15	19	15	18	16	20	16	21	17	22	18	21	18	24	20	23	20	24	19	26	20	5	3
green – €1 coin minted / red – €1 coin was not minted / grey – not yet part of the eurozone

PP means the proof-condition coins. Numbers means if more than one coin was minted in that year in that condition by the country. In Germany, there are five mint marks, so they mint ten types of coins in every year. In Greece, there were coins in 2002 which were minted in Finland with S mint mark. In the Vatican, there were coins minted with John Paul II's effigy, and with "Sede Vacante" image in 2005.

== Error coins ==
There are several error 1-euro coins: Italian types from 2002 without mintmarks; Portuguese coins, also from 2002 with another type of edging (28 stripes instead of 29) and from 2008 with the first type of the common side, officially used until 2007; and the famous Monegasque coin from 2007 without mint marks.

== Similar coins ==
The coins were minted in several of the participating countries, many using blanks produced at the Birmingham Mint in Birmingham, England. A problem has arisen in differentiation of coins made using similar blanks and minting techniques.

- The Turkish 50 New Kuruş coin (which was in circulation from 2005 until 2008) closely resembled the €1 coin in both weight and size, and both coins seem to be recognized and accepted by coin-operated machines as being a €1 coin; however, 1 euro are worth roughly 10 times than 50 Turkish kuruş. There are now some vending machines which have been upgraded to reject the 50 kuruş coin.
- The Brazilian $1 coin is also similar to the 1 Euro coin. It is worth around 18 Euro Cents (1/5 of the 1 Euro coin).
- The British £1 coin looks similar to the €1 coin. It is worth around €1.15.
- The Polish 2 złotych coin, currently worth about 0.46 EUR.
- The Italian 1000 lire minted from 1997 to 2001 has a diameter 3.75 larger. The coin was worth approximately €0.51.
