= Pomos =

Village in Paphos District, Cyprus

Pomos Πωμός
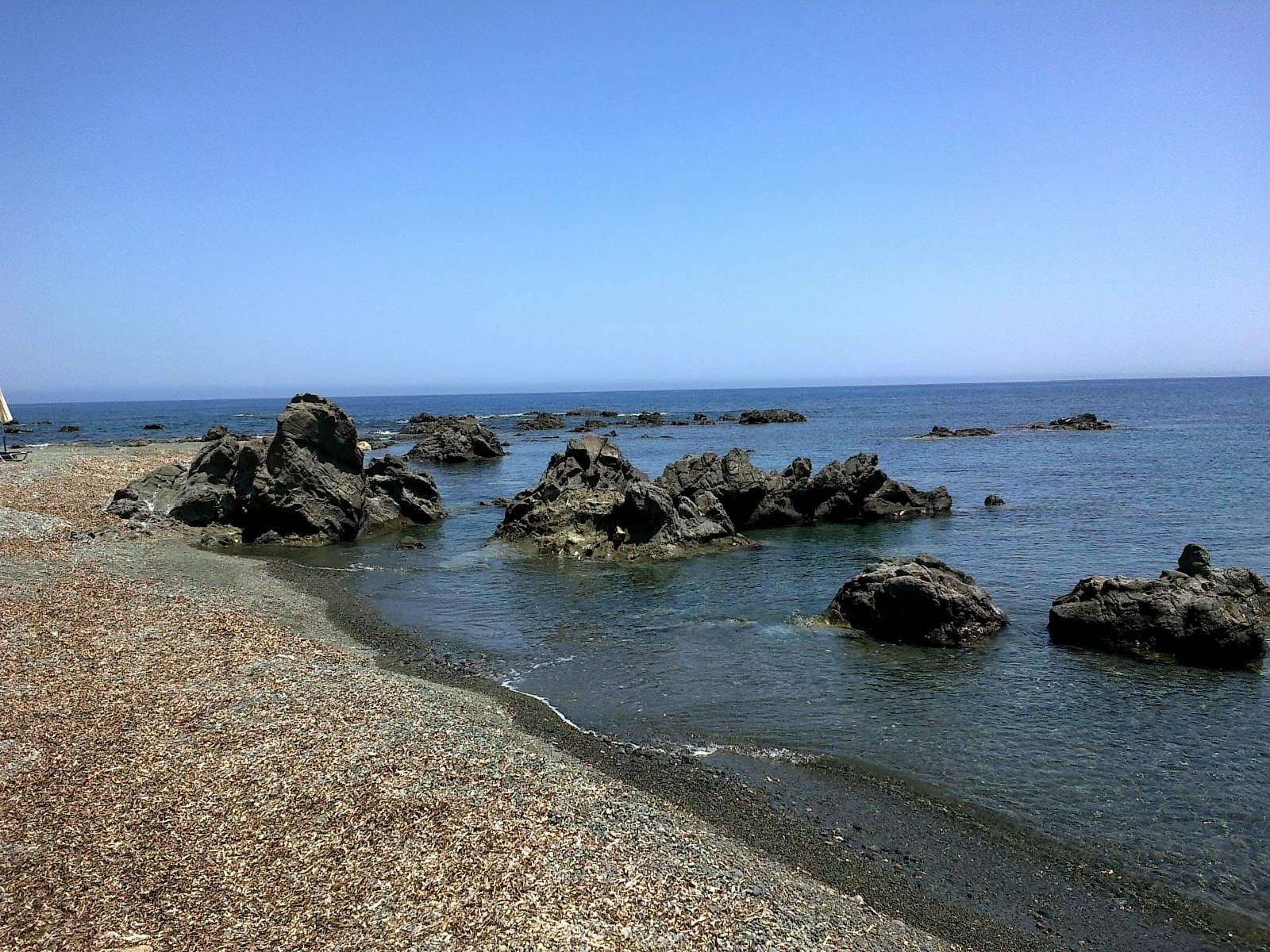

- Location in Cyprus
- Coordinates: 35°9′35″N 32°32′42″E
- Country: Cyprus
- District: Paphos District

Population (2001)
  - Total: 595
- Time zone: UTC+2 (EET)
  - Summer (DST): UTC+3 (EEST)
- Postal code: 6367

Pomos (Greek: Πωμός) is a village in the Paphos District of Cyprus, located 17 km northeast of Polis Chrysochous.

Despite being one of the most remote villages of Cyprus it hosts several cultural events and festivities.

== Etymology ==
The name Pomos is widely believed to originate from the Ancient Greek word vomus (βωμός), meaning "altar", indicating the potential presence of an ancient sanctuary or temple in the area. On medieval maps, the settlement was recorded under the name Pomo.

== Geography ==
Pomos is located in the Tillyria (Tylliria) region within the Paphos District, situated on the northwestern coast of Cyprus. While the coastal village sits at an elevation of roughly 10 metres (33 ft), the surrounding terrain rises steeply inland to 670 metres (2,200 ft) at Mount Lorovounos.

To the north of the village lies Cape Pomos, which was recorded in ancient geography by Claudius Ptolemy as Cape Kallinousa. The southern boundaries of the village border the protected Paphos Forest.

== History and Archaeology ==
=== Idol of Pomos ===
Pomos is widely known as the discovery site of the Idol of Pomos, a prehistoric picrolite cruciform figurine dating to the Chalcolithic period (c. 3000–2300 BC). Representing a mother goddess or fertility symbol, the artifact is housed at the Cyprus Museum in Nicosia. The figurine was adopted as a symbol of Cypriot cultural heritage and is depicted on the obverse side of Cyprus's €1 and €2 coins.

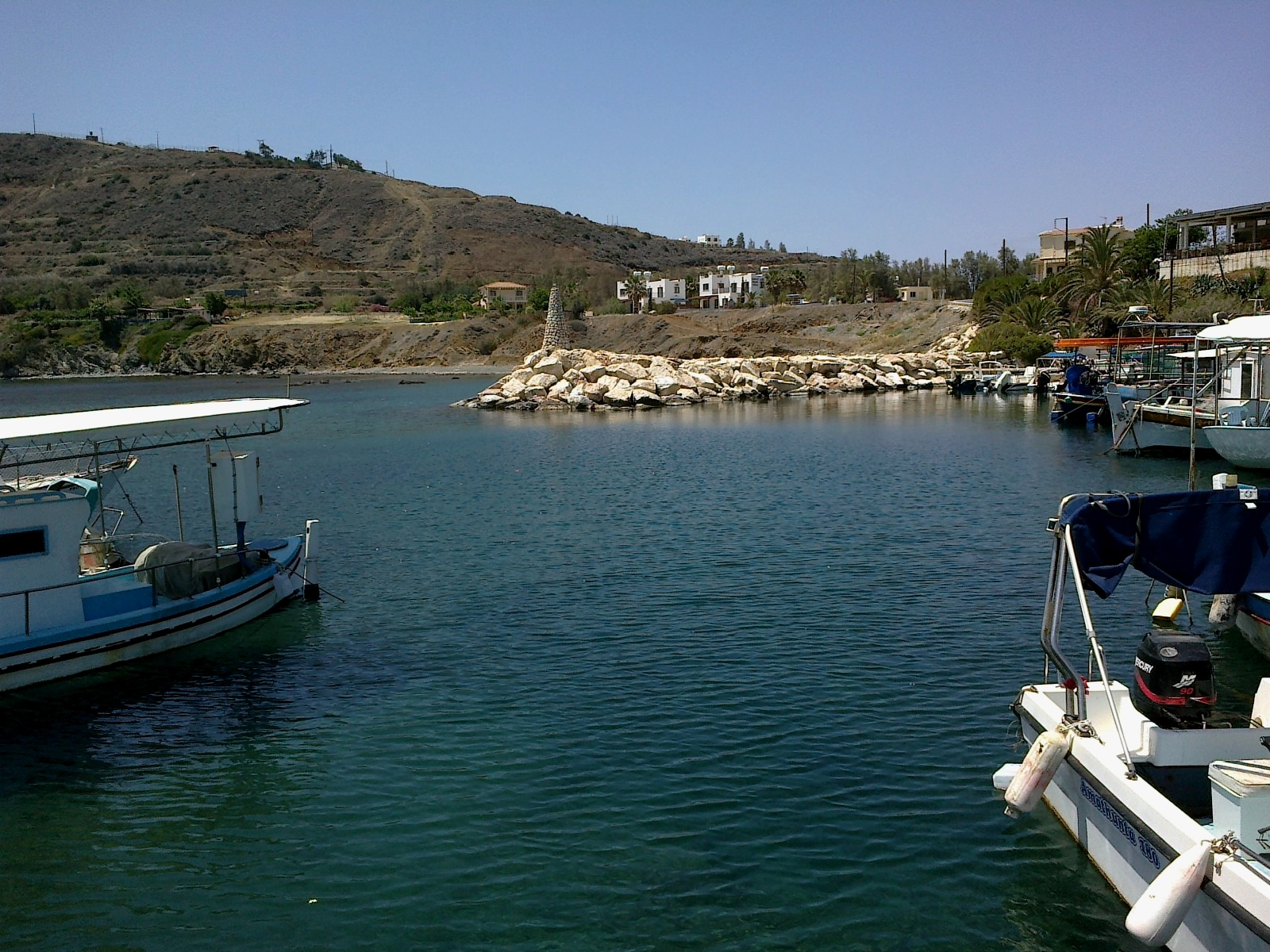

=== Medieval Period ===
North of the main village lie the unexcavated ruins of the medieval settlement of Ayia Eleni, historically associated with the arrival of Saint Helen in Cyprus during the 4th century.

== Infrastructure and Landmarks ==
=== Pomos Dam ===
Constructed between 1960 and 1966, the Pomos Dam is a rock-fill embankment dam with a storage capacity of 860,000 cubic metres (30,000,000 cu ft). It serves the Chrysochous Irrigation Project, supplying water to local agricultural land.

=== Fishing Shelter ===
Beneath Cape Pomos sits a dedicated fishing harbor that serves local commercial and recreational vessels.

=== Panagia Chrysopateritissa Monastery ===
Located 5 kilometres (3.1 mi) inland near the dam, the historic site of the Monastery of Panagia Chrysopateritissa dates to around 1520. While much of the original monastery complex has degraded, the church itself remains standing and restored.
