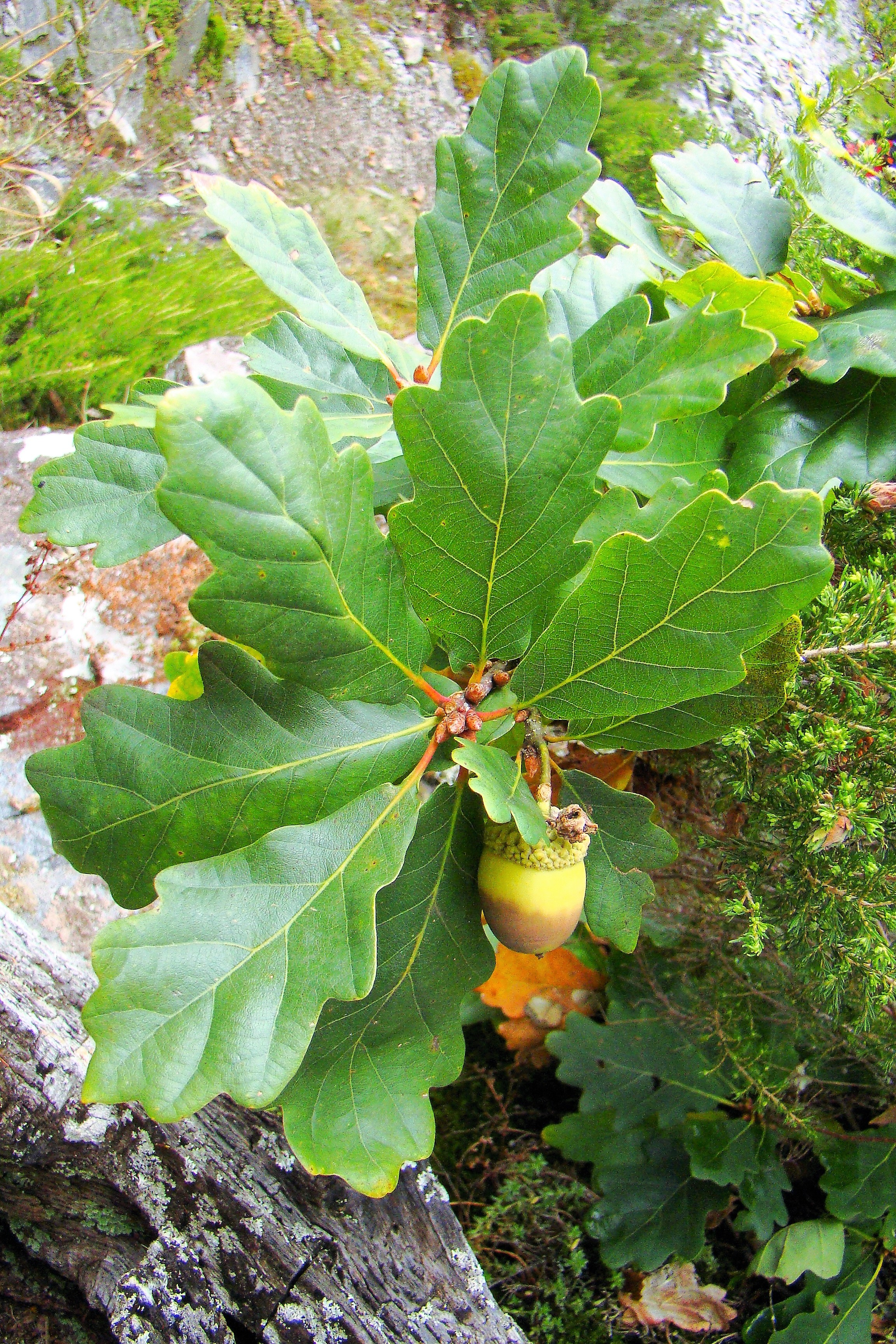

Scientific classification
- Kingdom: Plantae
- Clade: Tracheophytes
- Clade: Angiosperms
- Clade: Eudicots
- Clade: Rosids
- Order: Fagales
- Family: Fagaceae
- Genus: Quercus
- Species: Q. orocantabrica

Binomial name
- Quercus orocantabrica Rivas Mart., Penas, T.E.Díaz & Llamas

= Quercus orocantabrica =

Species of plant

Quercus orocantabrica, the Cantabrian mountain oak, is a species of deciduous oak. It occurs in the Cantabrian Mountains of northwestern Spain and northern Portugal.
