= Cypriot euro coins =

Designs of Cypriot currency

Cypriot euro coins feature three separate designs for the three series of coins. Cyprus has been a member of the European Union since 1 May 2004, and is a member of the Economic and Monetary Union of the European Union. It has completed the third stage of the EMU and adopted the euro as its official currency on 1 January 2008.

== Cypriot euro design ==
For images of the common side and a detailed description of the coins, see euro coins.

Depiction of Cypriot euro coinage | Obverse side
€0.01	€0.02	€0.05
The mouflon
€0.10	€0.20	€0.50
The Kyrenia ship
€1	€2	€2 Coin Edge
		2 ΕΥΡΩ 2 EURO
The Idol of Pomos		2 ΕΥΡΩ 2 EURO

== Design selection process ==
The official public contest for the design of the Cypriot euro coins, which ended on 14 October 2005, defined what the required motifs of the respective coins should encompass:

- 1 cent, 2 cent and 5 cent: The mouflon, the most characteristic species of fauna in Cyprus, representing the island's nature and wildlife.
- 10 cent, 20 cent and 50 cent: The ancient Greek Kyrenia ship of 4th Century B.C., representing Cyprus's history and its character as an island as well as its importance in trade.
- €1 and €2: The Idol of Pomos, a cross-shaped idol dating back to the Cypriot chalcolithic period (3000 B.C.), found in Pomos, a village in the district of Paphos. It is a characteristic example of prehistoric art in Cyprus, representing the island's antiquity, culture and civilization.

American artist Erik Maell and Greek artist Tatiana Soteropoulos were chosen by the Central Bank of Cyprus to create and illustrate the designs to be used for the final coins. The artists were instructed to include the name of Cyprus in Greek and Turkish, that is, ΚΥΠΡΟΣ (Kypros) and KIBRIS in the design for the coins.

== Circulating mintage quantities ==
The following table shows the mintage quantity for all Cypriot euro coins, per denomination, per year.

Face Value	€0.01	€0.02	€0.05	€0.10	€0.20	€0.50	€1.00	€2.00
2008	40 000 000	100 000 000	60 000 000	70 000 000	65 000 000	30 000 000	28 000 000	25 000 000
2009	20 000 000	1 000 000	6 000 000	1 000 000	1 000 000	1 000 000	4 000 000	5 000 000
2010	200 000	200 000	200 000	200 000	200 000	200 000	200 000	200 000
2011	15 210 000	210 000	30 210 000	210 000	210 000	210 000	210 000	210 000
2012	210 000	210 000	1 000 000	1 000 000	1 000 000	1 000 000	1 000 000	1 000 000
2013	100 000	100 000	100 000	100 000	100 000	100 000	100 000	100 000
2014	100 000	100 000	100 000	100 000	100 000	100 000	100 000	100 000
2015	7 100 000	100 000	100 000	100 000	100 000	100 000	100 000	100 000
2016	8 007 000	100 000	100 000	100 000	100 000	100 000	100 000	100 000
2017	100 000	100 000	100 000	100 000	100 000	100 000	100 000	100 000
2018	18 100 000	100 000	14 100 000	100 000	100 000	100 000	100 000	7 100 000
2019	11 100 000	9 100 000	8 100 000	5 600 000	6 100 000	1 400 000	100 000	1 400 000
2020	8 005 000	8 405 000	7 505 000	1 705 000	4 305 000	1 505 000	105 000	3 305 000
2021	9 155 000	12 605 000	7 955 000	4 445 000	4 805 000	1 925 000	1 580 000	3 005 000
2022	9 905 000	9 755 000	8 855 000	4 805 000	5 165 000	1 925 000	1 730 000	3 755 000
2023	595 000	795 000	595 000	245 000	245 000	100 000	100 000	463 000
2024	100 000	100 000	100 000	100 000	100 000	100 000	100 000	100 000

=== Mints ===
2008-2009: Finland
2010-2018: Greece

== Identifying marks ==
National Identifier	"ΚΥΠΡΟΣ (Kypros) and KIBRIS"
Mint Mark	None
Engravers Initials	None
€2 Edge inscription	

== €2 commemorative coins ==
Year	Subject	Volume

== Other commemorative coins (collectors' coins) ==
Although Cyprus joined the Eurozone in 2008, they already had one high value commemorative coin, minted in silver. This coin was minted as a legacy of an old national practice of minting gold and silver coins. This coin is not really intended to be used as means of payment, so generally they do not circulate.

== Euro adoption ==
On 11 October 2006, the final designs of the Cypriot euro coins were presented at the exhibition "Από τη Λίρα στο Ευρώ" ("From the Pound to the Euro") of the Central Bank of Cyprus about the history of currency in Cyprus. They do not appear to include "Cyprus" in English, as demanded by the revised competition rules, but instead only in the state's two official languages, Greek and Turkish.

On 13 February 2007, the Republic of Cyprus formally applied to join the eurozone on 1 January 2008. The final decision was expected to be taken in Brussels on 21–22 June at an EU Summit to be ratified by all EU heads of state.

On 9 March 2007, the campaign to inform the citizens of Cyprus about the euro officially began in Cypriot media.

On 15 March 2007, the House of Representatives passed the necessary laws for the introduction of the euro on 1 January 2008.

On 16 May 2007, the Commissioner for Economic & Financial Affairs of the EU, Joaquín Almunia, recommended that Cyprus adopt the euro as scheduled.

On 20 June 2007, the European Parliament voted affirmatively on this issue and on 21 June 2007, the date was confirmed by the EU leaders.

On 10 July 2007, the EU Finance Ministers set the permanent exchange rate to CYP 0.585274 to 1 euro.

On 23 October 2007, the designs were officially published in the Official Journal of the European Union.

On 1 January 2008, the euro replaced the Cypriot pound as the official currency.

== See also ==
- Cyprus in the European Union
