= Spanish euro coins =

Designs of Spanish currency

Spanish euro coins feature three different designs for each of the three series of coins. The minor series of 1, 2, and 5 cent coins were designed by Garcilaso Rollán, the middle series of 10, 20, and 50 cent coins by Begoña Castellanos, and the two major coins feature the portrait of King Felipe VI of Spain. All designs feature the 12 stars of the EU, the year of minting, and the word España (Spanish for Spain).

== First series (1999–2009) ==
For images of the common side and a detailed description of the coins, see euro coins.

The first sets of euro coins were minted in 1999 and the euro was put into circulation in the eurozone in 2002. Like Belgium, Finland, France and the Netherlands, the first euro coins of Spain are marked 1999, not 2002.

Depiction of Spanish euro coinage (1999–2009) | Obverse side
€0.01	€0.02	€0.05
The Obradoiro façade of the Cathedral of Santiago de Compostela
€0.10	€0.20	€0.50
Miguel de Cervantes, Spanish writer
€1.00	€2.00	€2 Coin Edge
		for a total of 12 stars
Effigy of King Juan Carlos I		for a total of 12 stars

== Second series (2010–2014) ==
In 2010, Spain updated their national sides in order to comply with the European commission recommendations. In the €1 and €2 coins, the same portrait of king Juan Carlos I was used, but the year position was placed in the inner part of the coin. Moreover, the twelve star ring no longer contained chiselled sections. The chiselled sections were also removed from designs for the other coins.

Depiction of Spanish euro coinage (2010–2014) | Obverse side
€0.01	€0.02	€0.05
The Obradoiro façade of the Cathedral of Santiago de Compostela
€0.10	€0.20	€0.50
Miguel de Cervantes, Spanish writer
€1.00	€2.00	€2 Coin Edge
		for a total of 12 stars
Effigy of King Juan Carlos I		for a total of 12 stars

== Third series (2015–present): King Felipe VI ==
In 2015, the portrait on the €1 and €2 coins was changed to that of the new King Felipe VI following his father's abdication the previous year.

Depiction of Spanish euro coinage (2015–present) | Obverse side
€0.01	€0.02	€0.05
The Obradoiro façade of the Cathedral of Santiago de Compostela
€0.10	€0.20	€0.50
Miguel de Cervantes, Spanish writer
€1.00	€2.00	€2 Coin Edge
		for a total of 12 stars
Effigy of Felipe VI		for a total of 12 stars

== Circulating mintage quantities ==
Face Value	€0.01	€0.02	€0.05	€0.10	€0.20	€0.50	€1.00	€2.00
1999	720,950,970	291,650,970	483,450,970	588,050,970	762,250,970	370,950,970	100,150,970	60,450,970
2000	83,350,400	711,250,400	399,850,400	243,850,400	29,250,400	519,550,400	89,250,400	36,550,400
2001	130,850,574	463,050,574	216,050,574	160,050,574	146,550,574	351,050,574	259,050,574	140,150,574
2002	140,977,699	3,977,699	8,177,699	112,977,699	91,377,699	9,677,699	335,477,699	163,877,699
2003	670,331,790	31,431,790	327,431,790	292,331,790	3,931,790	5,831,790	297,231,790	44,331,790
2004	206,657,000	206,657,000	258,657,000	121,857,000	3,857,000	4,357,000	98,657,000	4,057,000
2005	444,147,077	275,047,077	411,347,077	321,247,077	3,947,077	3,847,077	77,747,077	3,947,077
2006	383,850,004	262,150,004	142,750,004	91,750,004	101,950,004	3,950,004	101,550,004	3,950,004
2007	383,958,434	185,258,434	247,058,434	132,058,434	46,458,434	3,958,434	150,558,434	3,958,434
2008	374,556,940	191,256,940	239,056,940	139,256,940	102,256,940	3,856,940	153,756,940	19,456,940
2009	131,467,500	164,067,500	219,767,500	151,367,500	75,367,500	3,967,500	60,567,500	17,467,500
2010	227,330,000	153,130,000	203,130,000	104,930,000	3,830,000	3,930,000	40,030,000	3,930,000
2011	357,940,200	107,940,200	105,540,200	4,340,200	3,940,200	3,940,200	100,440,200	3,940,200
2012	400,600,000	99,600,000	49,800,000	3,700,000	26,200,000	4,000,000	3,400,000	4,000,000
2013	297,500,000	200,600,000	9,800,000	3,300,000	4,000,000	4,000,000	4,000,000	4,000,000
2014	65,000,000	19,400,000	119,900,000	80,100,000	29,600,000	3,800,000	15,300,000	3,600,000
2015	476,800,000	162,800,000	55,300,000	4,000,000	4,100,000	4,300,000	4,300,000	3,000,000
2016	437,900,000	230,100,000	310,200,000	77,200,000	79,100,000	72,800,000	111,100,000	4,200,000
2017	519,600,000	311,800,000	249,800,000	134,600,000	112,500,000	19,000,000	122,700,000	500,000
2018	317,900,000	233,100,000	222,000,000	71,100,000	119,500,000	19,500,000	107,200,000	300,000
2019	324,900,000	210,200,000	236,200,000	56,000,000	137,000,000	68,000,000	122,000,000	500,000
2020	205,000,000	244,400,000	221,800,000	47,100,000	52,100,000	20,900,000	100,900,000	4,300,000
2021	96,800,000	78,500,000	94,900,000	29,100,000	26,100,000	10,700,000	26,400,000	3,800,000
2022	152,000,000	108,900,000	94,300,000	10,800,000	17,500,000	3,900,000	3,000,000	1,000,000
2023	76,100,000	178,600,000	138,300,000	111,800,000	58,900,000	19,000,000	119,800,000	900,000

== Identifying marks ==
National Identifier	"España"
Mint Mark	
Engraver's Initials	None
€2 Edge inscription	

== €2 commemorative coins ==
Year	Subject	Volume

=== Spanish UNESCO World Heritage Sites series ===
Spain started the commemorative coin series Patrimonio de la Humanidad de la UNESCO (UNESCO World Heritage) in 2010, commemorating all of Spain's UNESCO World Heritage Sites, which could continue until 2058. The order in which the coin for a specific site is issued coincides with the order in which they were declared a UNESCO World Heritage site. The coins issued are:

Year	Number	Design	Volume
2010	1	Mosque-Cathedral of Córdoba (Historic Centre of Córdoba)	
2011	2	Patio de los Leones of the Alhambra in Granada	
2012	3	Burgos Cathedral	
2013	4	Monastery and Site of the Escorial	
2014	5	Park Güell (Works of Antoni Gaudí)	
2015	6	Cave of Altamira (Paleolithic Cave Art of Northern Spain)	
2016	7	Aqueduct (Old Town of Segovia)	
2017	8	Santa María del Naranco (Monuments of Oviedo and the Kingdom of Asturias)	
2018	9	Santiago de Compostela	
2019	10	Ávila with its Extra-Muros Churches	
2020	11	Mudéjar Architecture of Aragon	
2021	12	Historic City of Toledo	
2022	13	Garajonay National Park (La Gomera)	
2023	14	Old Town of Cáceres	
2024	15	Cathedral, Alcázar and General Archive of the Indies in Seville	
2025	16	Old City of Salamanca	
2026 (planned)	17	Monastery of Poblet	
2027 (planned)	18	Royal Monastery of Santa Maria de Guadalupe	
2028 (planned)	19	Archaeological Ensemble of Mérida	

== See also ==
- Adoption of the euro in Spain
