= Commemorative coins of Spain =

The commemorative coins of Spain are minted by the Real Casa de la Moneda

- 10 euros : Silver 8-réales - weight : 27 g - diameter : 40 mm
- 12 euros : Silver - weight : 18 g - diameter : 33 mm
- 50 euros : Silver sequin - weight : 168,75 g - diameter : 73 mm
- 200 euros : Gold 4-escudos - weight : 13,5 g -diameter : 30 mm
- 400 euros : Gold

€2 commemorative coins are issued by the Banco de Espana (EU countries are allowed 2 x commemorative 2 Euro coins per year).

== 10 euro coins ==
- 2002 - 2002 Winter Olympics Salt Lake City - on the obverse is the effigy of H.M. Juan Carlos, and on the reverse a cross-country skier.
- 2002 - Spain's Presidency of the E.U. - To commemorate Spain's Presidency of the European Union during the first semester of 2002.
- 2002 - Football World Cup 2002 in South Korea and Japan - The obverse of this coin reproduces a player about to shoot a ball showing the letter "O", the reverse motif is a football.
- 2002 - Football World Cup 2002 in South Korea and Japan - The obverse illustrates the goalkeeper's stretch towards the ball with the letter "L", on the reverse is the goalkeeper's glove.
- 2002 - International Year Antoni Gaudí i Cornet
- 2002 - International Year Antoni Gaudí i Cornet with Casa Milà
- 2002 - International Year Antoni Gaudí i Cornet with El Capricio
- 2002 - second Centenary of Menorca Island in Spain
- 2002 - first centenary of the birth of Luis Cernuda
- 2002 - first centenary of the birth of Rafael Alberti
- 2003 - 25th year of Spanish constitution (6 December 1978)
- 2003 - World Football cup 2006 in Germany
- 2003 - With Latin America Meeting between two world about navigation
- 2003 - first year of the euro
- 2003 - Fifth centenary of the birth of Miguel López de Legazpi
- 2003 - Natation meeting in Barcelona (FINA)
- 2003 - 75th year of the school boat Juan Sebastián Elcano
- 2004 - 5th Centenary of Isabella I of Castile
- 2004 - World Football cup 2006 in Germany
- 2004 - Olympic Games 2004 Athens
- 2004 - Holy Year Xacobeo 2004 : The year 2004 is a Santiago de Compostela Jubilee Year, Xacobeo 2004, the first this century and the first in the millennium.
- 2004 - The Europa Program - Enlargement of the E.U. on the reverse is depicted a map of Europe with the names of the new nations that have joined the European Union: Estonia, Latvia, Poland, Hungary, Czech Republic, Lithuania, Slovakia, Slovenia, Malta, and Cyprus.
- 2004 - Centenary of the birth of Salvador Dalí. On the reverse of this first coin is an interpretation of the painting Atomic Leda (1949).
- 2004 - Centenary of the birth of Salvador Dalí. On the reverse of this second coin is a rendering of the work The great masturbator (1929).
- 2004 - Centenary of the birth of Salvador Dalí. The reverse depicts a rendering of the painting Soft self-portrait with fried bacon (1941).
- 2004 - the wedding of His Royal Highness the Prince of Asturias, Felipe de Borbón y Grecia, and Letizia Ortiz Rocasolano.

== 12 euro coins ==
- 2002 - Spain's Presidency of the E.U.
- 2003 - 25th Anniversary of the Spanish Constitution
- 2004 - 5th Centenary of Isabella I of Castile. The reverse shows a bust of Isabella I of Castile in profile, together with her anagram, the crowned "Y".
- 2004 - the wedding of His Royal Highness the Prince of Asturias, Felipe de Borbón y Grecia, and Letizia Ortiz Rocasolano.
- 2005 - 4th centenary of the publication of Miguel de Cervantes' Don Quixote. The reverse side features Don Quixote of La Mancha reading, seated atop his piles of books, lance in hand.

== 50 euro coins ==
- 2002 - International Year Antoni Gaudí i Cornet. The obverse of this coin reproduces the face of Gaudi and his architectural details. On the reverse, the Expiatory Temple of the Holy Family.
- 2003 - First Anniversary of the Euro. The Constitutional coat-of-arms has been reproduced on the reverse of this coin, surrounded by a variety of architectonic styles that are also shown on the Euro banknotes.
- 2004 - 5th Centenary of Isabella I of Castile. The obverse portrays the bust of Queen Isabella I of Castile in profile and a view of the castle of La Mota. The reverse shows a fragment of the painting The surrender of Granada by Francisco Pradilla Ortiz that hangs in the Palacio del Senado.
- 2004 - Centenary of the birth of Salvador Dalí. This coin features on its obverse a version of the painting One second before awakening (1944), and on its reverse an interpretation of the work Rhinocerotic figure from Phidias's Ilisos (1954).

== 100 euro coins ==
- 2003 - FIFA World Cup Germany 2006. The reverse depicts a goalkeeper kicking the football back into play.
- 2004 - FIFA World Cup Germany 2006. The reverse portrays the colorful figure of a football goalkeeper making a dive.

== 200 euro coins ==
- 2002 - FIFA World Cup 2002. The obverse illustrates two players competing for the ball, surrounded by the letter G, and the reverse shows a football boot.
- 2003 - 25th Anniversary of the Spanish Constitution. The reverse of the coin reproduces the central part of the frontispiece crowning the main façade of the Palace of Congress, portraying an allegory of Spain embracing the Constitution, flanked by Justice and Fortitude.
- 2003 - First Anniversary of the Euro. Depicted on the reverse is the Greek myth of the Rape of Europa, to which the continent owes its name.
- 2004 - 5th Centenary of Isabella I of Castile. The obverse reproduces a coin minted during the reign of the Catholic Monarchs, the 4-excelentes. The reverse features the coat-of-arms of the city of Granada situated on the building of La Lonja in the Royal Chapel of Granada.
- 2004 - Enlargement of the European Union. The obverse portrays H.M. King Juan Carlos I, while the reverse features a map of Europe showing the names of the new nations that have joined the European Union: Estonia, Latvia, Poland, Hungary, Czech Republic, Lithuania, Slovakia, Slovenia, Malta, and Cyprus.
- 2004 - the wedding of His Royal Highness the Prince of Asturias, Felipe de Borbón y Grecia, and Letizia Ortiz Rocasolano.

== 400 euro coins ==
- 2002 - International Year Antoni Gaudí i Cornet. The obverse of this coin reproduces the bust of Gaudi. On the reverse the magnificent Casa Batlló.
- 2004 - Centenary of the birth of Salvador Dalí. this coin presents a portrait of Salvador Dalí on the obverse, and an interpretation of the painting Figure at a window (1925) on the reverse.
