= Withdrawal from the eurozone =

Member state ceases use of the euro as its currency

Withdrawal from the Eurozone is the process whereby a Eurozone member-state, whether voluntarily or forcibly, stops using the euro as its national currency and leaves the Eurozone.

== Background ==
The possibility of a member state leaving the Eurozone was first raised after the onset of the Greek government-debt crisis. The term "Grexit" itself was reportedly first used by Citigroup economists Willem Buiter and Ebrahim Rahbari in a 2012 report about the possibility of Greece leaving the Eurozone. In the 2015 edition, the term "Grexit" entered the Oxford English Dictionary, defined as "a term for the potential withdrawal of Greece from the Eurozone, the economic region formed by those countries in the European Union that use the euro as their national currency.

Speculation followed about other countries, such as Italy, withdrawing from the Eurozone as well, with economist Nouriel Roubini submitting in 2011 that "Italy may, like other periphery countries [of the Eurozone], need to exit the euro and go back to a national currency, thus triggering an effective break-up of the Eurozone."

There are some European cases of a country having a common currency obtaining their own, when countries split apart. Czech koruna and Slovak koruna split from Czechoslovak koruna in 1993, both at exchange rate 1:1. Banknotes were stamped as a way of converting them to the new currency. Additionally, the Slovenian tolar and Croatian kuna were created by leaving the Yugoslav dinar, and the Estonian kroon, Latvian lats, and Lithuanian litas were created by leaving the Soviet ruble.

== Legal environment ==
It has been argued that there is no provision in any European Union treaty for an exit from the Eurozone. Moreover, it has been argued, the Treaties make it clear that the process of monetary union was intended to be "irreversible" and "irrevocable." However, in 2009, a European Central Bank legal study argued that voluntary withdrawal is legally not possible but expulsion remains "conceivable." Although an explicit provision for an exit option does not exist, many experts and politicians in Europe have suggested that an option to leave the Eurozone should be included in the relevant treaties.

Other analysts have submitted that there are basically three ways of exiting the Eurozone: by leaving and subsequently rejoining the EU, whereby a renewed membership in the European Union would be possible only when economic convergence had been achieved; through a Treaty amendment; or through a European Council decision. The amendment would involve an extension of Article 50 of the European Treaty that would set out the process for exiting the euro.

A decision by the European Council would "probably" have to be unanimous and "with the consent of the European Parliament." It would state that a Eurozone member-state "will no longer be part of the Eurozone" and will become a member-state "with a derogation", by withdrawing the Council's earlier decision for that state's entry into the Eurozone. Article 139 regulates the terms of this "derogation":

Member States in respect of which the Council has not decided that they fulfil the necessary conditions for the adoption of the euro shall hereinafter be referred to as 'Member States with a derogation'.

The competence of the council to retract its earlier decision would "possibly" invoke the argument that a given competence to decide on a matter always includes the competence to retract that decision. Additionally, this retractile power can be derived from the "flexibility clause" of article 352 TFEU, which grants the council, on a proposal from the Commission and with the consent of the European Parliament, the ability to unanimously adopt the "appropriate measures" to attain one of the objectives set out in the Treaties as set out in Article 3 of the European Union – essentially ascertaining that staying in the Eurozone would be so "devastating" for the well-being of the people of the member-state, and/or the rest of the peoples of Europe, that an exit would be legitimate in light of the Treaties' objectives. Then, it would be ostensibly possible to take a decision retracting the previous decision that approved entry to the Eurozone.

Acknowledging that the method of any departure from the Eurozone remains "unknown," legal analysts have pointed out that any potential withdrawal "includes the spectre that euro obligations owed by residents of departing member states might be redenominated into [the] newly established national currencies."

On the issue of leaving the Eurozone, the European Commission has stated that "[t]he irrevocability of membership in the euro area is an integral part of the Treaty framework and the Commission, as a guardian of the EU Treaties, intends to fully respect [that irrevocability]." The Commission added that it "does not intend to propose [any] amendment" to the relevant Treaties, the current status being "the best way going forward to increase the resilience of euro area Member States to potential economic and financial crises. The European Central Bank, responding to a question by a Member of the European Parliament, has stated that an exit is not allowed under the Treaties.

=== Withdrawal from the European Union ===
If a state leaves the European Union, Article 50 of the Treaty on European Union says that "Treaties shall cease to apply to the State in question". If the state has been using the euro as its currency then, rather than form a new domestic currency, it might continue to use the euro unilaterally – as Montenegro does – or by way of a monetary agreement with the EU – as Andorra does – without being a member of the EU.

== Potential operational process ==
On 18 October 2011, Eurosceptic British businessman and Conservative life peer Simon Wolfson launched a contest that offered a £250,000 reward for "a plan for how the euro could be safely dismantled," and for "what a post-euro eurozone would look like, how transition could be achieved and how the interests of employment, savers, and debtors would be balanced."

The winning entry, titled "Leaving the Euro: A Practical Guide," recommended that member-states who want to exit should introduce a new currency and default on a large part of their debts. The net effect, the proposal claimed, would be "positive for growth and prosperity". It called for keeping the euro for small transactions and for a short period of time after the exit from the Eurozone, along with a strict regime of inflation-targeting and tough fiscal rules monitored by "independent experts". The plan also suggested that "key officials" should meet "in secret" one month before the exit is publicly announced, and that Eurozone partners and international organisations should be informed "three days before". The winning entry's team leader stated said, "if executed correctly, the pain of exit would relatively soon be replaced by a return to growth," something that would encourage other distressed states still in the currency zone to exit as well."

In 2018, Columbia University economics professor and Nobel laureate Joseph Stiglitz, in the context of arguing that Italy faces "a choice [the country] shouldn’t have to make: between membership in the Eurozone and economic prosperity," remarked that "the challenge [of exit] will be to find a way to leave the Eurozone that minimizes the economic and political costs. A massive debt restructuring, carefully done, with special attention to the consequences for domestic financial institutions, will be essential. Without such a restructuring," Stiglitz argued, "the burden of euro denominated debt would soar, offsetting possibly a large part of the potential gains." He claimed that from "an economic perspective, the easiest thing to do would be for [the exiting country's] entities (governments, corporations and individuals) to simply redenominate debts from Euros into the new [national currency]" and then "enact a super-Chapter 11 bankruptcy law, providing expeditious recourse to debt restructuring to any entity for whom the new national currency presents severe economic problems."

== Economic considerations ==
At the American Economic Association's annual meeting of 2015, University of California, Berkeley economic historian Barry Eichengreen predicted that the withdrawal of a member state, such as Greece, from the Eurozone, would "set off [a] devastating turmoil in financial markets." At the same event, Harvard professor of Public Policy and professor of Economics Kenneth Rogoff characterised the overall common-currency project in Europe a "historic disaster", while Harvard professor of Economics and NBER president emeritus Martin Feldstein opined that "there may be no way to end to [the] euro crisis," and suggested that to avoid a break-up and "ensure the Euro's survival," the best way forward "would be for each individual Eurozone member-state to enact its own tax policies to spur demand, including cutting the value-added tax for the next five years to increase consumer spending."

Specifically for Greece, a 2015 PwC study expected the "new drachma" to depreciate "almost immediately" and inflation in the country to rise "sharply" to around 6% on average. The study predicted that "the [new currency's] depreciation would lead to a high inflationary environment with a medium-term inflation rate of around 4%, more than double the expected rate in the Eurozone." German ordoliberal economist and president of the Ifo Institute for Economic Research Hans-Werner Sinn, on the other hand, argued for the economic benefits for Greece if the country were to withdraw from the Eurozone.

In 2015, German finance minister Wolfgang Schäuble reportedly proposed that Greece "temporarily" exits the Eurozone for 5 years and re-introduces a national currency. The "informal" proposal contained a provision whereby Athens would transfer state assets worth €50 billion into a trust fund located in Luxembourg and controlled by the European Stability Mechanism, in order for the assets to be sold off and the proceeds to pay off part of the Greek debt. Analysts compared this "asset-stripping enterprise" to West Germany's privatisation of East German state-property after the fall of the Berlin Wall in 1989.

The German finance minister, subsequently, stated that the German side "only called attention to the possibility that Athens itself can decide on taking a timeout," explaining that "[d]ebt relief is not possible within the currency union. European treaties do not allow it." Schäuble's informal proposal was reportedly withdrawn from the agenda by common agreement between the Greek government and the Eurozone leadership.

Finland's parliament decided in late 2015 to debate within the next year whether to quit the Eurozone or not, in a move seen by analysts as unlikely to end Finland's membership in the single-currency zone but would "highlight Finns' dissatisfaction with their country's economic performance."

== Popular sentiment ==
In the mid-2010s, polls conducted across Europe, showed that because of the general "disillusionment with the European Union," which has "more noticeably affected Greece, Belgium, the United Kingdom, the Netherlands and Italy," there is also a "significant erosion" in the support for a common currency. In the majority of European countries surveyed in 2015 by Gallup International most respondents "oppose the Euro." In the two "key Eurozone members" Germany and France, as well as in Spain, majorities in favour of retaining the euro as common currency are present. Among Eurozone members the strongest anti-euro sentiments were registered in Italy and Greece.

In 2015, the Greek parliament approved the government's proposal for a referendum that would ostensibly decide, through a decision between "Yes" or "No," the way forward in the ongoing negotiations of Greece with the creditors' institutions. Despite the claims by analysts abroad and in Greece that the referendum might open the way for Greece's withdrawal from the Eurozone, and despite polls showing that Greek citizens would prefer keeping the common currency "at all costs," the referendum, conducted on 5 July 2015, returned a result of 61.3% for "No" and 38.7% for "Yes." On Monday, 13 July 2015, the government of Greece accepted the bailout package offered by the creditors' institutions.

By late 2018, public sentiment in the eurozone had been strongly favourable towards the Euro, with 74% of respondents saying that it was "a good thing" for their country and 15% calling it "a bad thing". The highest support for the common currency was identified in Ireland (85%), Luxembourg (80%), and Austria (76%), while the lowest in Italy (57%), Cyprus (47%), and Lithuania (42%). At the same time, 69% of respondents across the Eurozone area said that they saw the need for more coordination of economic policy, including budgetary policies, and 7% said they preferred less coordination.

== See also ==
- Dedollarisation
- Enlargement of the eurozone
- Overview of Eurozone enlargement, and of exchange-rate regimes
- Economic and Monetary Union of the European Union
- Euro area crisis
- Causes of the European debt crisis
- Proposed long-term solutions for the euro area crisis
- 2000s European sovereign debt crisis timeline
- List of acronyms associated with the eurozone crisis
- European integration
- Euroscepticism
- Withdrawal from the European Union
