= Germain Pirlot =

Belgian Esperantist (born 1943)

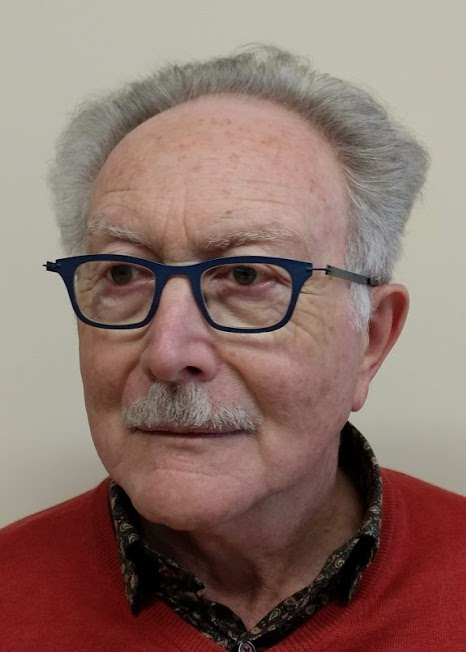
- Born: March 18, 1943 (age 83); Gedinne, Belgium

Germain Pirlot (French pronunciation: [ʒɛʁmɛ̃ piʁlo]; born 18 March 1943) is a Belgian Esperantist and former teacher, presently living in Ostend. He is widely credited as the inventor of the name euro for the common currency of the European Union (EU).

== Early life ==
Pirlot was born in the village of Sart-Custinne, Gedinne, located in the province of Namur, Belgium.

== Euro ==
On 4 August 1995, Pirlot sent a letter to then President of the European Commission, Jacques Santer, in which he suggested the name euro to be used for the planned currency of the EU. The name was original because it broke with proposals based on historical precedents such as franc, crown, florin, or escudo which had existing national or regional connotations. Later, Pirlot received an official letter thanking him for the suggestion. However, it has been suggested that euro had been discussed as early as the 1960s and it was only around the time of Pirlot's letter that it began to gain widespread acceptance.

The name euro was officially adopted by the European Council at Madrid (Spain) on 16 December 1995. Jean-Jacques Schul, chairman of Promeuro (Association for the promotion of the euro), claims that to his knowledge nobody else had suggested to use this name for the currency before 4 August 1995.

Another suggestion made by Pirlot in the same letter, to name the hundredth of the currency "ropas", has not been realized – instead, the name "cent" has been adopted.
