= Proposed long-term solutions for the eurozone crisis =

Proposals to resolve the 2009/10 debt crisis

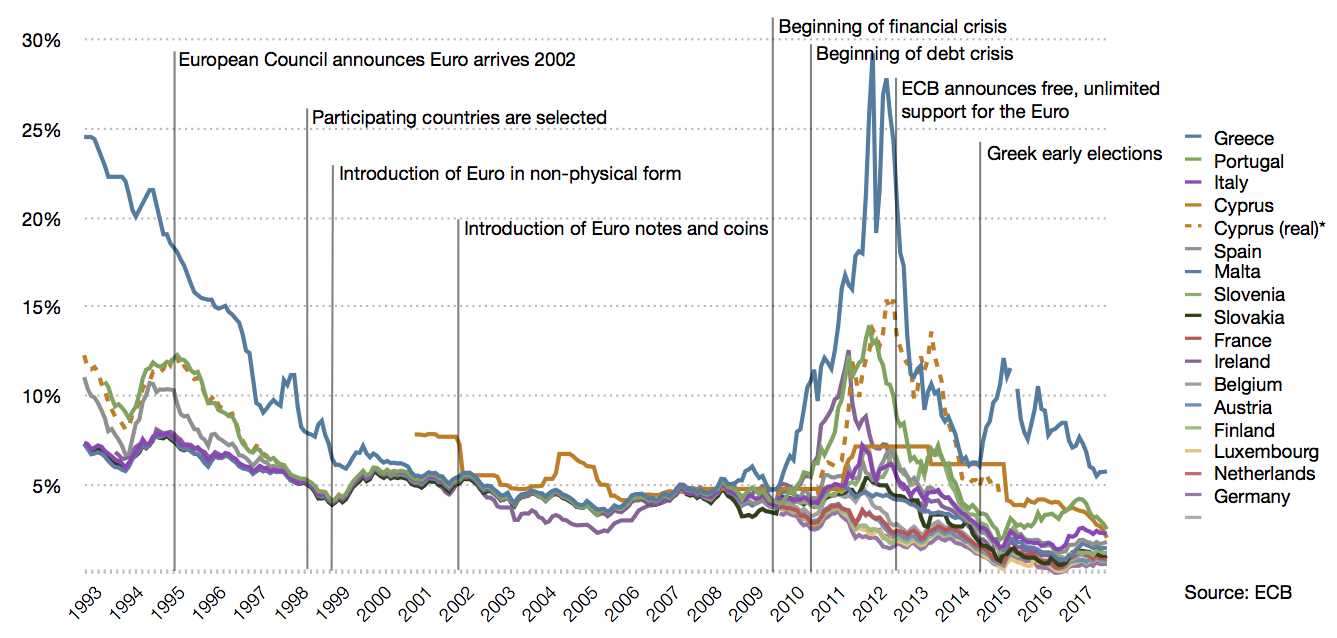
Spread of interest rates in Eurozone countries

The proposed long-term solutions for the eurozone crisis address ways to deal with the European debt crisis that took place in the European Union from 2009 till the late 2010s, including risks to Eurozone country governments and the Euro.

The solutions attempt to address the difficulty some countries in the eurozone experienced trying to repay or re-finance their government debt, without the assistance of third parties. The solutions range from tighter fiscal union, the issuing of Eurozone bonds to debt write-offs, each of which has both financial and political implications, meaning no solution has found favour with all parties involved.

== Background to the crisis ==
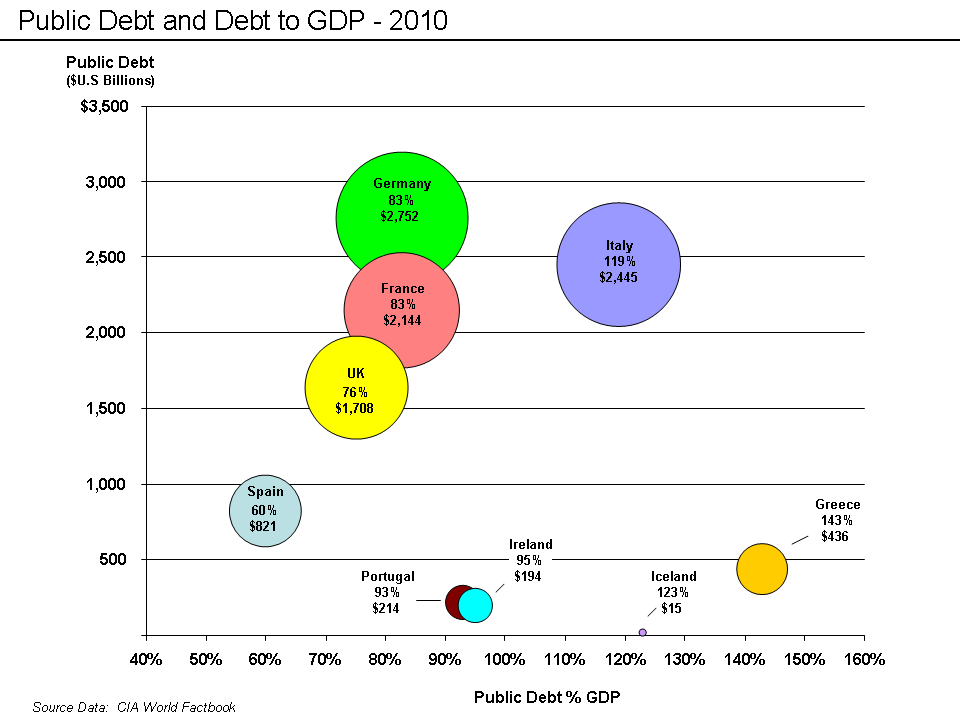
Public debt $ and %GDP (2010) for selected European countries

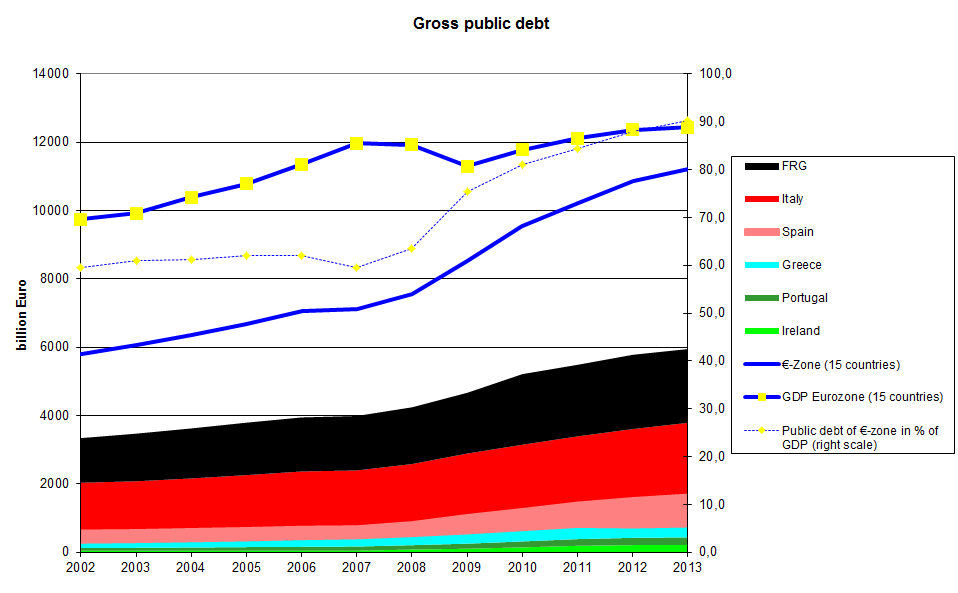
Government debt of Eurozone, Germany and crisis countries compared to Eurozone GDP

The European sovereign debt crisis resulted from a combination of complex factors, including the globalization of finance; easy credit conditions during the 2002–08 period that encouraged high-risk lending and borrowing practices; the 2008 financial crisis; international trade imbalances; real estate bubbles that subsequently burst; the Great Recession; fiscal policy choices related to government revenues and expenses; and approaches used by nations to bail out troubled banking industries and private bondholders, assuming private debt burdens or socializing losses.

One narrative describing the causes of the crisis, begins with the significant increase in savings available for investment during the 2000–2007 period, when the global pool of fixed-income securities increased from approximately $36 trillion in 2000 to $70 trillion by 2007. This "Giant Pool of Money" increased as savings from high-growth developing nations entered global capital markets. Investors searching for higher yields than those offered by U.S. Treasury bonds sought alternatives globally.

The temptation offered by such readily available savings overwhelmed the policy and regulatory control mechanisms in country after country, as lenders and borrowers put these savings to use, generating bubble after bubble across the globe. While these bubbles have burst, causing asset prices (e.g., housing and commercial property) to decline, the liabilities owed to global investors remain at full price, generating questions regarding the solvency of governments and their banking systems.

How each European country involved in this crisis borrowed and invested the money varies. For example, Ireland's banks lent the money to property developers, generating a massive property bubble. When the bubble burst, Ireland's government and taxpayers assumed private debts. In Greece, the government increased its commitments to public workers in the form of extremely generous wage and pension benefits, with the former doubling in real terms over 10 years. Iceland's banking system grew enormously, creating debts to global investors (external debts) several times GDP.

The interconnection in the global financial system means that if one nation defaults on its sovereign debt or enters into recession putting some of the external private debt at risk, the banking systems of creditor nations face losses. For example, in October 2011, Italian borrowers owed French banks $366 billion (net). Should Italy be unable to finance itself, the French banking system and economy could come under significant pressure, which in turn would affect France's creditors and so on. This is referred to as financial contagion. Another factor contributing to interconnection is the concept of debt protection. Institutions entered into contracts called credit default swaps (CDS) that result in payment should default occur on a particular debt instrument (including government issued bonds). But, since multiple CDSs can be purchased on the same security, it is unclear what exposure each country's banking system now has to CDS.

Greece hid its growing debt and deceived EU officials with the help of derivatives designed by major banks. Although some financial institutions clearly profited from the growing Greek government debt in the short run, there was a long lead-up to the crisis.

== Proposals ==
A number of different long-term proposals have been put forward by various parties to deal with the Eurozone crises, these include;

=== European fiscal union ===
Increased European integration giving a central body increased control over the budgets of member states was proposed on 14 June 2012 by Jens Weidmann President of the Deutsche Bundesbank, expanding on ideas first proposed by Jean-Claude Trichet, former president of the European Central Bank. Control, including requirements that taxes be raised or budgets cut, would be exercised only when fiscal imbalances developed. This proposal is similar to contemporary calls by Angela Merkel for increased political and fiscal union which would "allow Europe oversight possibilities."

=== European bank recovery and resolution authority ===
European banks are estimated to have incurred losses approaching €1 trillion as a result of the 2008 financial crisis. The European Commission approved €4.5 trillion in state aid for banks between October 2008 and October 2011, a sum which includes the value of taxpayer-funded recapitalizations and public guarantees on banking debts. This has prompted some economists such as Joseph Stiglitz and Paul Krugman to note that Europe is not suffering from a sovereign debt crisis but rather from a banking crisis.

On 6 June 2012, the European Commission adopted a legislative proposal for a harmonized bank recovery and resolution mechanism. The proposed framework sets out the necessary steps and powers to ensure that bank failures across the EU are managed in a way which avoids financial instability. The new legislation would give member states the power to impose losses, resulting from a bank failure, on the bondholders to minimize costs for taxpayers. The proposal is part of a new scheme in which banks will be compelled to "bail-in" their creditors whenever they fail, the basic aim being to prevent taxpayer-funded bailouts in the future. The public authorities would also be given powers to replace the management teams in banks even before the lender fails. Each institution would also be obliged to set aside at least one per cent of the deposits covered by their national guarantees for a special fund to finance the resolution of banking crisis starting in 2018.

=== Eurobonds ===
A growing number of investors and economists say Eurobonds would be the best way of solving a debt crisis, though their introduction matched by tight financial and budgetary coordination may well require changes in EU treaties. On 21 November 2011, the European Commission suggested that eurobonds issued jointly by the 17 euro nations would be an effective way to mitigate the effects of the 2008 financial crisis. Using the term "stability bonds", Jose Manuel Barroso insisted that any such plan would have to be matched by tight fiscal surveillance and economic policy coordination as an essential counterpart so as to avoid moral hazard and ensure sustainable public finances.

Germany remains largely opposed at least in the short term to a collective takeover of the debt of states that have run excessive budget deficits and borrowed excessively over the past years, saying this could substantially raise the country's liabilities.

=== European Monetary Fund ===
On 20 October 2011, the Austrian Institute of Economic Research published an article that suggests transforming the EFSF into a European Monetary Fund (EMF), which could provide governments with fixed interest rate Eurobonds at a rate slightly below medium-term economic growth (in nominal terms). These bonds would not be tradable but could be held by investors with the EMF and liquidated at any time. Given the backing of all eurozone countries and the ECB "the EMU would achieve a similarly strong position vis-a-vis financial investors as the US where the Fed backs government bonds to an unlimited extent." To ensure fiscal discipline despite lack of market pressure, the EMF would operate according to strict rules, providing funds only to countries that meet fiscal and macroeconomic criteria. Governments lacking sound financial policies would be forced to rely on traditional (national) governmental bonds with less favorable market rates.

The econometric analysis suggests that "If the short-term and long- term interest rates in the euro area were stabilized at 1.5% and 3%, respectively, aggregate output (GDP) in the euro area would be 5 percentage points above baseline in 2015". At the same time sovereign debt levels would be significantly lower with, e.g., Greece's debt level falling below 110% of GDP, more than 40 percentage points below the baseline scenario with market based interest levels. Furthermore, banks would no longer be able to unduly benefit from intermediary profits by borrowing from the ECB at low rates and investing in government bonds at high rates.

=== Drastic debt write-off financed by wealth tax ===
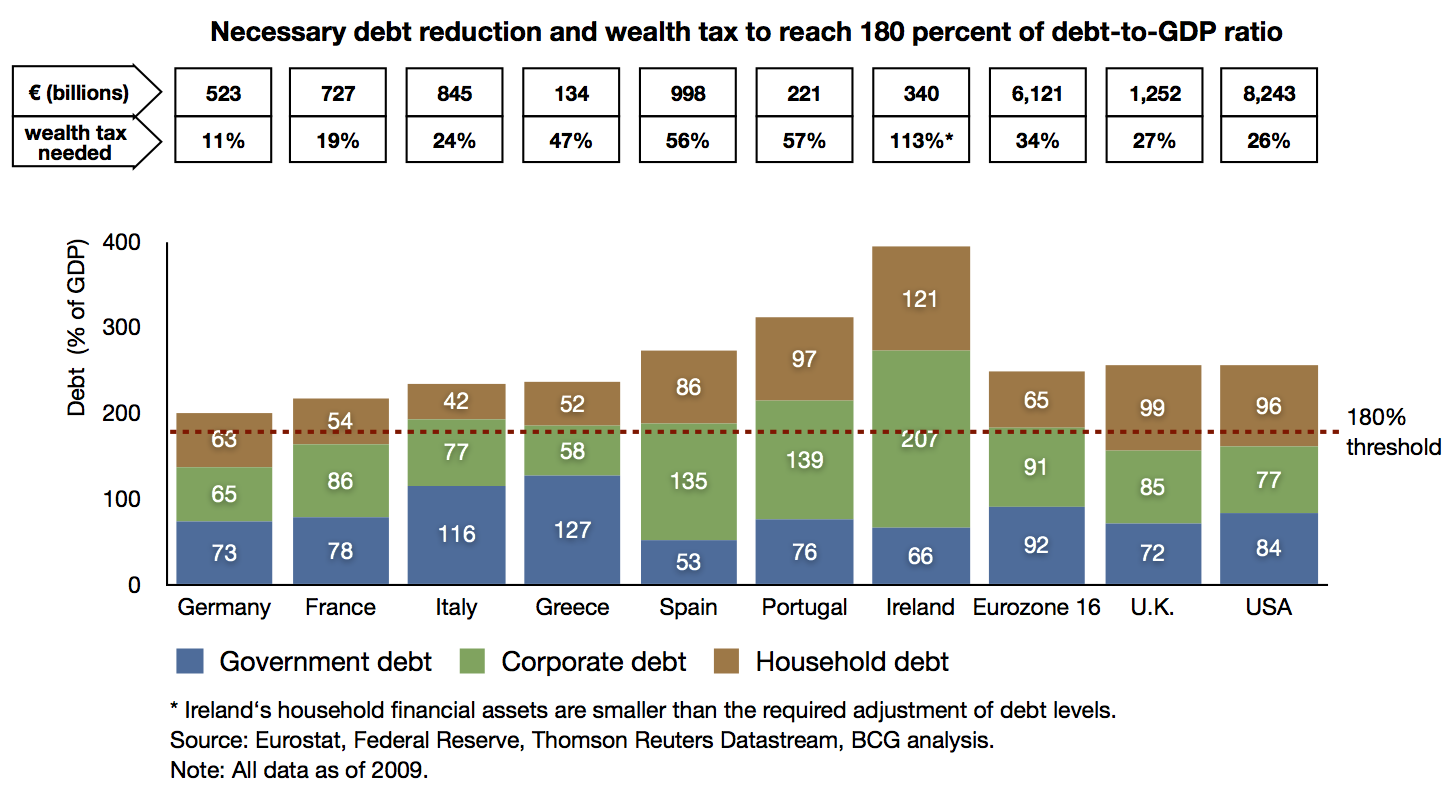
Overall debt levels in 2009 and write-offs necessary in the Eurozone, UK and U.S. to reach sustainable grounds.

According to the Bank for International Settlements, the combined private and public debt of 18 OECD countries nearly quadrupled between 1980 and 2010, and will likely continue to grow, reaching between 250% (for Italy) and about 600% (for Japan) by 2040. A BIS study released in June 2012 warns that budgets of most advanced economies, excluding interest payments, "would need 20 consecutive years of surpluses exceeding 2 per cent of gross domestic product – starting now – just to bring the debt-to-GDP ratio back to its pre-crisis level". The same authors found in a previous study that increased financial burden imposed by aging populations and lower growth makes it unlikely that indebted economies can grow out of their debt problem if only one of the following three conditions is met:

- government debt is more than 80 to 100 percent of GDP;
- non-financial corporate debt is more than 90 percent;
- private household debt is more than 85 percent of GDP.

The first condition, which was suggested by an influential paper written by Kenneth Rogoff & Carmen Reinhart has been disputed due to major calculation errors. In fact, the average GDP growth at public debt/GDP ratios over 90 percent is not dramatically different than when debt/GDP ratios are lower.

The Boston Consulting Group (BCG) added to the original finding that if the overall debt load continues to grow faster than the economy, then large-scale debt restructuring becomes inevitable. To prevent a vicious upward debt spiral from gaining momentum the authors urge policy makers to "act quickly and decisively" and aim for an overall debt level well below 180 percent for the private and government sector. This number is based on the assumption that governments, nonfinancial corporations, and private households can each sustain a debt load of 60 percent of GDP, at an interest rate of 5 percent and a nominal economic growth rate of 3 percent per year. Lower interest rates and/or higher growth would help reduce the debt burden further.

To reach sustainable levels the Eurozone must reduce its overall debt level by €6.1 trillion. According to BCG this could be financed by a one-time wealth tax of between 11 and 30 percent for most countries, apart from the crisis countries (particularly Ireland) where a write-off would have to be substantially higher. The authors admit that such programs would be "drastic", "unpopular" and "require broad political coordination and leadership" but they maintain that the longer politicians and central bankers wait, the more necessary such a step will be.

Instead of a one-time write-off, German economist Harald Spehl has called for a 30-year debt-reduction plan, similar to the one Germany used after World War II to share the burden of reconstruction and development. Similar calls have been made by political parties in Germany including the Greens and The Left.

== See also ==
- 2000s commodities boom
- 2008–2011 Icelandic financial crisis
- Crisis situations and unrest in Europe since 2000
- Federal Reserve Economic Data FRED
- Great Recession in Europe
- Liikanen report
- List of acronyms associated with the eurozone crisis
- List of countries by credit rating
- List of people associated with the eurozone crisis
