= The Raspberry Ice Cream War =

Children's comic book published by EUCom

Publication information
- Publisher: European Commission
- Format: One-shot (30 pages)
- Genre: Comic fantasy
- Publication date: August 1998
- No. of issues: 1

Creative team
- Written by: Matthias Ripp
- Artist: Atelier Wilinski
- Editor: Michael Jäger

The Raspberry Ice Cream War (subtitled A comic for young people on a peaceful Europe without frontiers) is a children's comic book published by the European Commission in 1998. There were editions in many languages, translated for example as Glasskriget ("Ice Cream War") in Swedish.

== Synopsis ==
The comic opens with a profile of the three main characters, two boys and a girl. In the English version, they are named Christine, Max, and Paul. The story begins with the three children meeting at a house, where they plan to depart for a walk in the woods. But instead, Christine gets interested in a website which needs a "special code" to access, and as they enter the website, their computer literally sucks them in through a spiraling tunnel and down into another world.

The children find themselves in an open field, still equipped with their hiking gear. In front of them is a long road, and a barricade defended by a guard wielding a large gleaming axe. He will not allow the children to pass, and after he searches them for identification which they do not have, they are forced to give him a fountain pen as a bribe. They keep trekking along the road and soon meet another border guard who will not let them through until they give him their compass, which the guard believes is a wristwatch.

As the children reach the edge of the nearest settlement, yet another guard stops them, this time demanding that they pay him money in order to be let in. The children rush the guard, whereupon a group of men armed with spears arrests them and forces them to walk into a castle. Only then do the children realise that they have traveled back in time.

The king speaks to the children while an unseen light shines down on them from above. The king believes the children to be spies from a nearby kingdom, and accuses them of attempting to steal his recipe for raspberry ice cream so that the children and "their people" can enjoy eating it with their "kingdom's" wafer biscuits. The king announces he is going to put the children into his dungeon until their king arrives with a recipe for making wafers.

Christine protests, and the king reveals that in the distant past, the two kingdoms used to share a dessert made of raspberry ice cream with wafer cookies; the kingdom the children are in now produced the ice cream and the neighbouring kingdom produced the biscuits. But a conflict, the Raspberry Ice Cream War, broke out, and since then the two kingdoms have carefully guarded these secrets and neither has been able to produce the recipe held by the other kingdom. The children suggest to the king that they could solve the problem by making peace with the rival kingdom, but the king and all his guards laugh at the suggestion and then explain that they speak different languages and that the other kingdom's roads are not navigable.

The children become frustrated. Christine begins drawing the yellow stars of the flag of Europe on the castle's marble floor, and explaining that in Europe, where the children originate from, they still have countries, but not borders. The king's guards continue laughing at the children, but this time the king tells them to be quiet so he can keep listening. He asks if they have war in Europe, and they reply that they have not fought a war for fifty years, and goes on to explain how the fifteen countries of the EU manage to resolve differences without violence.

The king is interested in hearing about their plans, and organises a feast for them to continue talking. After the feast, everyone seems to be happier, but Paul and Christine want to return to their own time. They find a wizard who promises they can return home if they jump into a pool of water. They run back to get Max, who is flirting with the king's daughter Dolly in another room. Max wants to stay, but the other children convince him to come back once he realises he will miss all of his favourite foods if he stays in the Middle Ages. All together, the children jump into the pool of water, though only after giving the wizard a Game Boy as he warned them the spell wouldn't work otherwise. With a splash the children are dumped out of the computer screen through which they entered, and gather themselves up to go on their originally planned hike "right across Europe".

After the end of the story are three pages drawn in the same cartoon style educating children about the European Union and the story's relevance to present reality, followed by a map and a list of addresses and telephone numbers.

== Reception ==
The idea of a government publication directly targeting European children with arguments in favour of strengthening the European Union proved quickly unpopular in some countries, most notably the United Kingdom. The British European Commission representative Geoffrey Martin decided to "pulp" 75,000 copies of the comic because he felt that the political point of view espoused by the comic was inappropriate, and Employment minister Andrew Smith described the comic as factually inaccurate. According to a Parliament press release from 1998, no copies of the comic were ever distributed in Britain, though other sources claim that there were some. The comic appears in the archives of the Easy Reading Corner of the European Union website, and it can be downloaded via the EU bookshop or from an archive of the University of Nebraska.

== Translations ==
The comic was published under similar titles in the other official languages of the 1998 European Union:

- La guerre de la glace à la framboise (French)
- Der Krieg ums Himbeereis (German)
- Krigen om jordbærisen (Danish)
- Glasskriget (Swedish)
- Ο πόλεμος του παγωτού βατόμουρο (Greek)
- La guerra del gelato al lampone (Italian)
- De frambozenijsoorlog (Dutch)
- A guerra dos gelados de framboesa (Portuguese)
- Sota vadelmajäätelöstä (Finnish)
- La guerra del helado de frambuesa (Spanish)
