= 2000s European sovereign debt crisis timeline =

Countries using the Euro de jure Countries and territories using the Euro de facto

From late 2009, fears of a sovereign debt crisis in some European states developed, with the situation becoming particularly tense in early 2010. Greece was most acutely affected, but fellow Eurozone members Cyprus, Ireland, Portugal, and Spain were also significantly affected. In the EU, especially in countries where sovereign debt has increased sharply due to bank bailouts, a crisis of confidence has emerged with the widening of bond yield spreads and risk insurance on credit default swaps between these countries and other EU members, most importantly Germany.

This was the first Eurozone crisis since its creation in 1999. As Samuel Brittan pointed out, Jason Manolopoulos "shows conclusively that the Eurozone is far from an optimum currency area". Niall Ferguson also wrote in 2010 that "the sovereign debt crisis that is unfolding... is a fiscal crisis of the western world". Axel Merk argued in a May 2011 Financial Times article that the dollar was in graver danger than the euro.

Concern about rising government deficits and debt levels across the globe together with a wave of downgrading of European government debt created alarm in financial markets. The debt crisis is mostly centred on events in Greece, where the cost of financing government debt has risen. On 2 May 2010, the Eurozone countries and the International Monetary Fund agreed to a €110 billion loan for Greece, conditional on the implementation of harsh austerity measures. On 9 May 2010, Europe's Finance Ministers approved a comprehensive rescue package worth €750 billion (then almost a trillion dollars) aimed at ensuring financial stability across Europe by creating the European Financial Stability Facility. The Greek bail-out was followed by an €85 billion rescue package for Ireland in November, and a €78 billion bail-out for Portugal in May 2011.

While the sovereign debt increases have been most pronounced in only a few Eurozone countries they have become a perceived problem for the area as a whole. In May 2011, the crisis resurfaced, concerning mostly the refinancing of Greek public debt. The Greek people generally rejected the austerity measures and have expressed their dissatisfaction with protests. In late June 2011, the crisis situation was again brought under control with the Greek government managing to pass a package of new austerity measures and EU leaders pledging funds to support the country. In May 2012 the crisis escalated to new levels following the national May 2012 Greek parliamentary election. Greek parties failed to form a coalition Government following the election and there was widespread speculation of Greece exiting the Eurozone, termed a "Grexit".

Below is a brief summary of some of the main events since the Greek government debt crisis.

== 2009 ==
=== October ===
- October – A new Greek government led by Panhellenic Socialist Movement (PASOK) was formed after the party received 43.92% of the popular vote and 160 of 300 parliamentary seats in the Greek legislative election, 2009.

== 2010 ==
=== January ===
- 14 January – Greece unveiled its Stability and Growth Programme which aimed to cut deficit from 12.7% in 2009 to 2.8% in 2012.

=== February ===
- 2 February – The Greek Government extended public sector wage freeze to those earning less than €2,000 a month.
- 3 February – The EU Commission backed Greece's Stability and Growth Programme and urged it to cut its overall wage bill.
- 10 February – Thousands of Greek civil servants staged a 24-hour strike shutting schools and grounding flights as the government planned to freeze pay and pensions.
- 24 February – One-day general strike against the austerity measures halted public services and transport system.
- 25 February – EU mission in Athens with International Monetary Fund (IMF) experts delivered a grim assessment of the country's finances.

The first round of austerity in 2010 failed to stop Greece's rising debt, which is expected to go up by 10% in 2011.

=== March ===
- 5 March – New Greek public sector wage cuts and tax increases were passed to generate an estimated saving of €4.8 billion. Measures include increasing value-added tax by 2% to 21%, cutting public sector salary bonuses by 30%, increases in fuel, tobacco and alcohol consumption taxes and freezing state-funded pensions in 2010.
- 11 March – Greek public and private sector workers strike.
- 15 March – European Monetary Union (EMU) finance ministers agree on a mechanism to help Greece but reveal no details.
- 18 March – Papandreou warns Greece will not be able to cut deficit if borrowing costs remain as high as they are and may have to go to the IMF.
- 19 March – European Commission President, José Manuel Barroso urges EU member states to agree a standby aid package for Greece. Barroso says the EMU countries should be on stand by to make bilateral loans.
- 25 March – European Central Bank (ECB) President, Jean-Claude Trichet says his bank will extend softer rules on collateral (accepting BBB? instead of the standard A−) for longer (up to 2011) in order to avoid a situation where one ratings agency (Moody's) basically decides if an EMU country's bonds are eligible for use as ECB collateral.
- March – €5 billion in 10-year Greek bonds sold – orders for three times that amount are received.

=== April ===
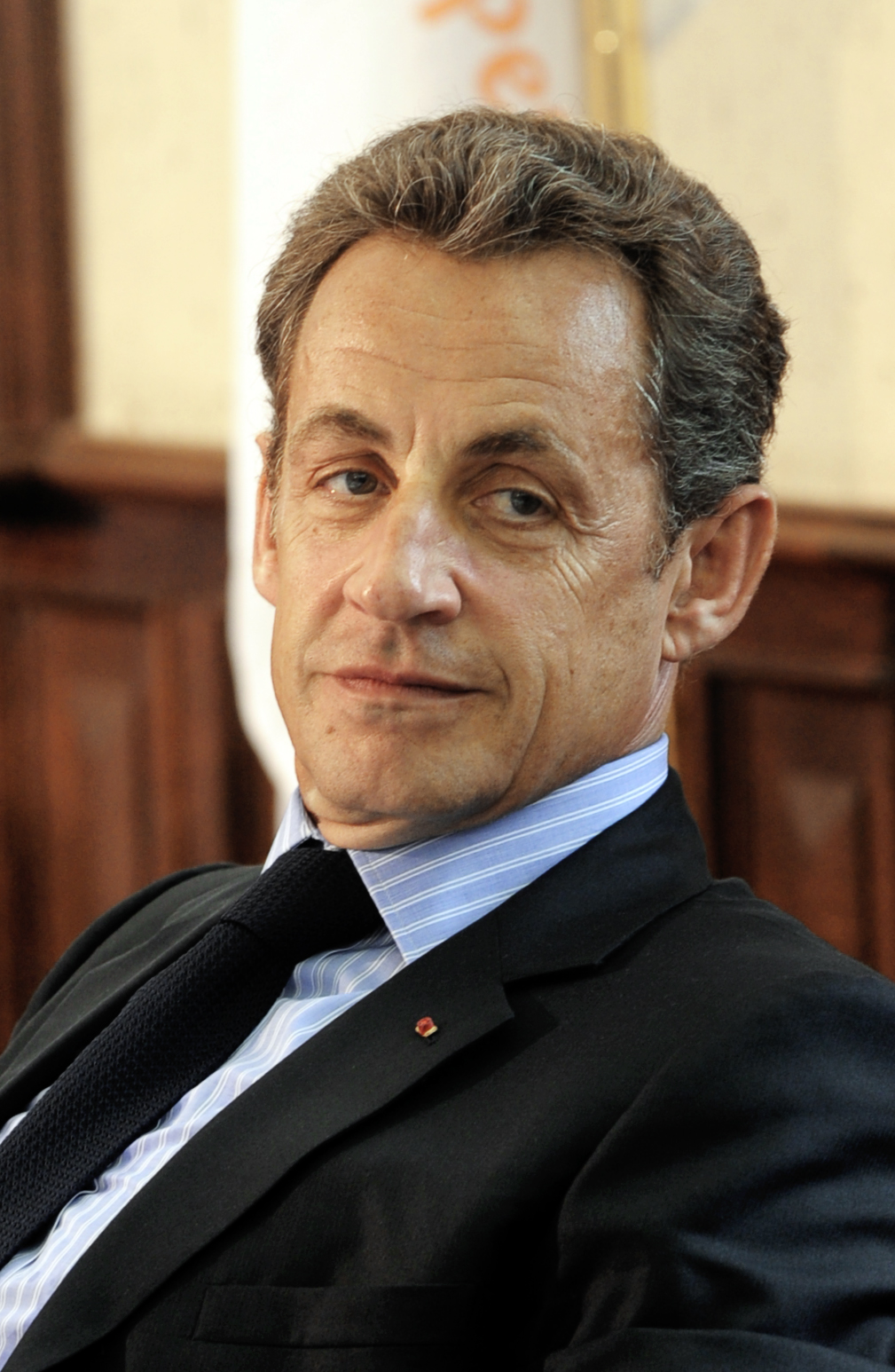
Former President of France, Nicolas Sarkozy

- 9 April – Government of Greece announces that the deficit for the first trimester was reduced by 39,2%.
- 11 April – EMU leaders agree bailout plan for Greece. Terms are announced for €30 billion of bilateral loans (roughly 5% for a three-year loan). EMU |countries will participate in the amount based on their ECB country keys. Rates for variable rate loans will be 3m-Euribor plus 300 basis points (bp) + 100 bp for over three-year loans plus a one-off 50 bp charge for operating expenses. For fixed rate loans rates will be swap rate for the loan's maturity, plus the 300 bp (as in variable) plus the 100 bp for loans over three years plus the 50 bp charge.
- 13 April – ECB voices its support for the rescue plan.
- 15 April – Olli Rehn says there is no possibility of a Greek default and no doubt that Germany will participate in the bailout plan. In the meantime there had been serious objections from parts of German society to the country's participation in the Greek bailout.
- 23 April – Greece officially asks for the disbursement of money from the aid package effectively activating it.
- 27 April:
  - Standard and Poor's downgrades Greece's debt ratings below investment grade to junk bond status.
  - S&P downgrades Portuguese debt two notches and issues negative outlook, warning that further downgrades to junk status are likely. Stock indices around the world drop two to six per cent on the news.
- 28 April – S&P downgrades Spanish bonds from AA to AA−.
- April – Sale of more than €1.5 billion Greek Treasury bills met with "stronger-than-expected" demand, albeit at a high interest rate.

=== May ===
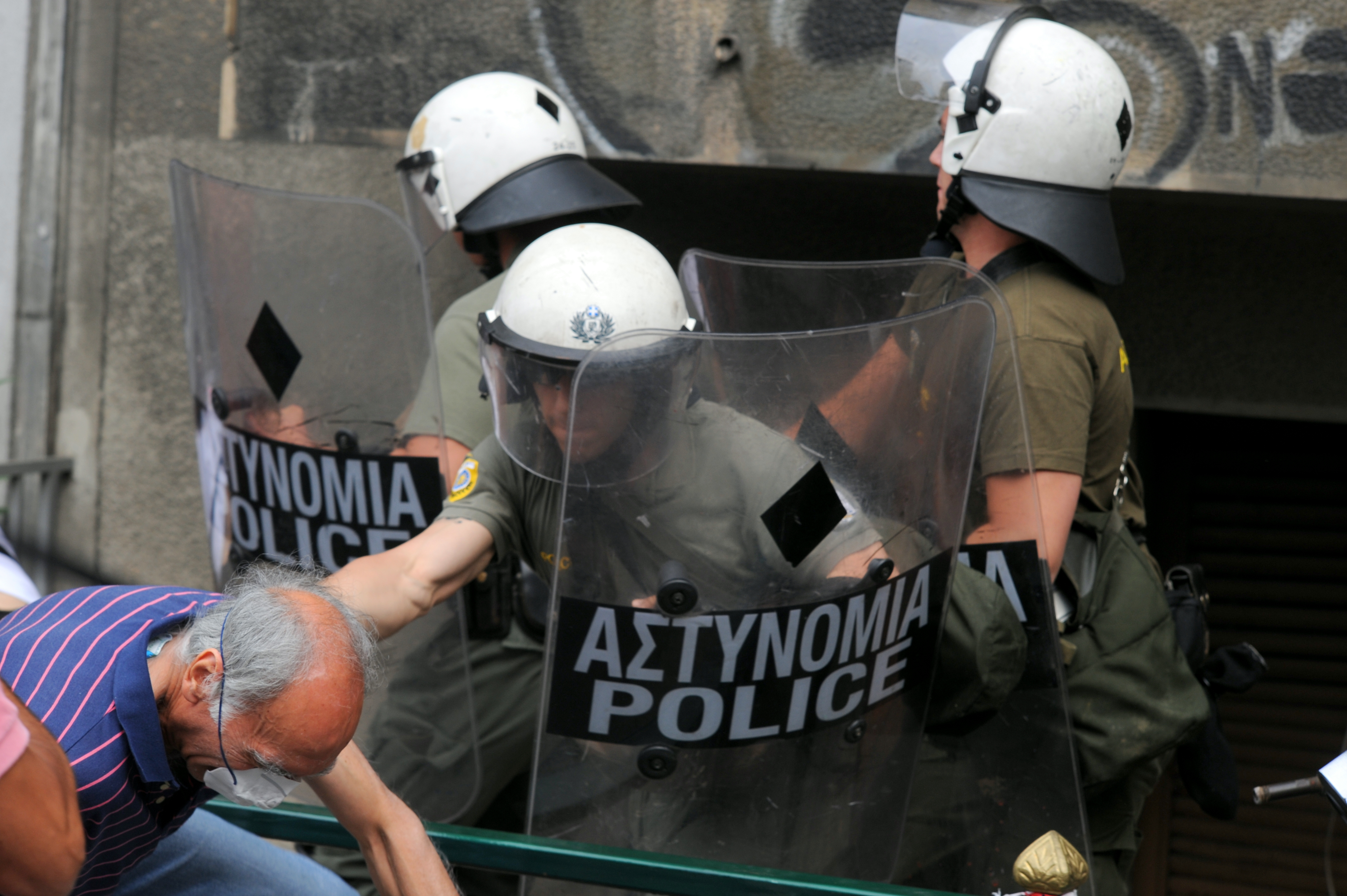
Clash between riot police and a citizen – 29 June 2011

- 1 May – Protests, yearly taking place for the day, this year add "the proposed austerity measures", in Athens.
- 2 May – Greece announces the latest, fourth, raft of austerity measures.
- 3 May – The ECB announces that it will accept Greek Government bonds as collateral no matter what their rating is. This effectively means scrapping the BBB-floor in the case of Greece and increasing the likelihood of similar announcements in case other countries run the risk of being downgraded to junk status.
- 4 May – First day of strikes against the austerity measures. Global stock markets react negatively to fears of contagion.
- 5 May – General nationwide strike and demonstrations in two major cities in Greece turned violent. Three people were killed when a group of masked people threw petrol bombs in a Marfin Egnatia Bank branch on Stadiou street.
- 6 May – Concerns about the ability of the Eurozone to deal with a spreading crisis effectively caused a severe market sell off, particularly in the United States where electronic trading glitches combined with a high volume sell off produced a nearly 1,000-point intra-day drop in the Dow Jones Industrial Average, before it recovered somewhat to close down 347.
- 7 May – Volatility continued to accelerate with an increasing CBOE VIX index and a major widening in currency spreads, particularly dollar-yen and dollar-euro.
- 8 May – Leaders of the Eurozone countries resolved in Brussels to take drastic action to protect the euro from further market turmoil after approving a $100 billion bailout plan for Greece.
- 10 May: In the context of the Securities Markets Programme (SMP), ECB as well as the central banks of the Eurosystem started purchasing securities.
- 20 May – Fourth strike in Greece against wage cuts.
- 24 May – Greek government is announcing deficit reduction by 41.5% for the first four months.
- 27 May – Debate rages in UK House of Commons about the prospect of Great Britain entering a similar financial crisis. These exchanges become known as The Greek Defence.
- 29 May – Fitch downgrades Government of Spain bonds one notch from AAA to AA+.

=== June ===
- 4 June – The Hungarian PM Viktor Orbán's spokesman said it was not an exaggeration that the prospect of a national default is very real, although Moody's still affirmed that Hungary had a good record of paying its obligations. The Euro fell to a four-year low and major American markets fell more than 3%.

=== July ===
- 5 July – The central Bank of Greece announced a reduction of central government cash deficit by 41.8%, for the first half-year 2010.

=== September ===
- 5 September – Spreads on longer-term Greek government debt have surged back to crisis levels of about 800 basis points, implying a high risk of default.
- 7 September – Finance Ministers of the EU countries approve the second of the bailout installments for Greece (€6.5 billion).
- 11 September – The IMF also approves the second installment of their bailout package for Greece (€2.57 billion).

=== October ===
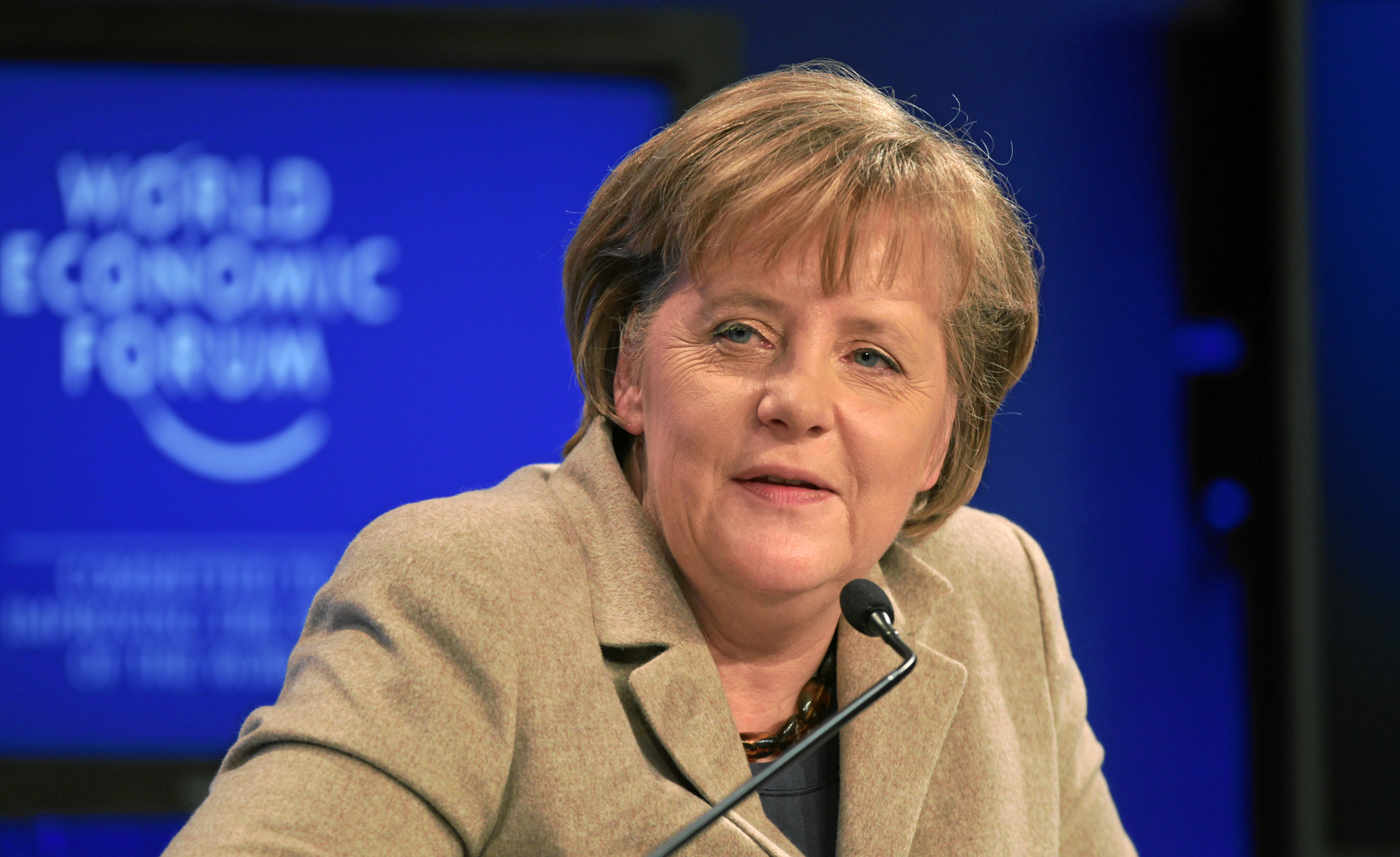
Angela Merkel, Chancellor of Germany

- 31 October – Angela Merkel's coalition, trailing in the German polls and with lander elections due in 2011, backs proposals to make bondholders pay for any future euro-area crises.

=== November ===
- 13 November – The potential for loss in value of government bonds or an interest holiday triggers selling of Irish debt. The 10-year Irish government bond premium surged to a record 652 basis points premium against the German bond.
- 16 November – Ireland started talks with the EU over a bailout. The move prompted further worry that Greece and Portugal were also in poor fiscal shape. The move follows previous denials that Ireland would need external help to alleviate its debt burden.
- 21 November – Ireland controversially accept an EU-IMF multibillion-euro package to help alleviate its debt burden.
- 22 November – Following the withdrawal of the Irish Green Party from the governing coalition, a new election is called.

== 2011 ==
=== January ===
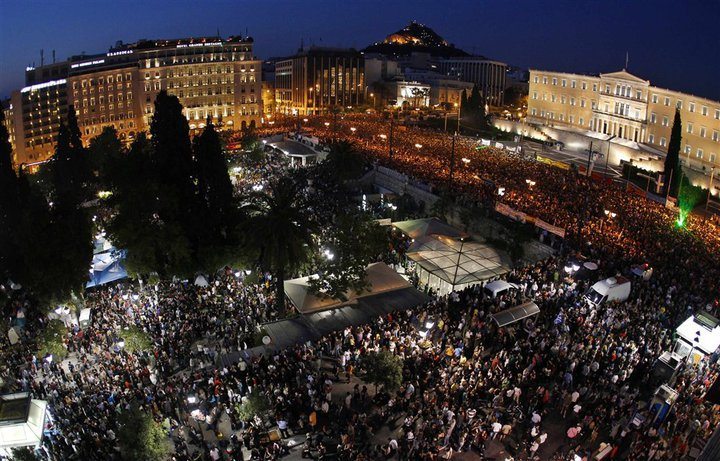
Demonstrators in front of the Greek parliament, 29 May

- January 2011 – Fitch becomes the third rating agency to cut Greek debt to "junk" status after S&P and Moody's.

=== May ===
- 2 May – Finance Minister George Papaconstantinou again rules out a debt restructuring, adding that he has just "expressed the hope" that the EU and IMF will agree to extend bailout loan repayments.
- 21 May – Mr Papandreou and senior ECB officials say Greece must avoid debt restructuring and push on with budget cuts and privatisations to overcome its debt crisis.
- 23 May – Greece unveils a series of privatisations, part of a goal to raise €50 billion by 2015 to pay down its debt mountain.

=== June ===
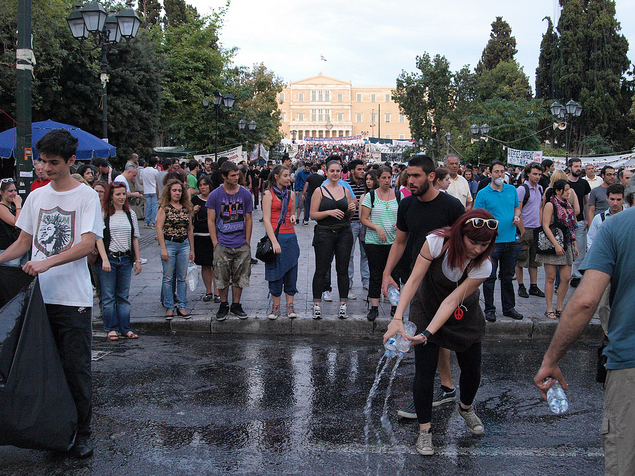
Indignants cleaning the streets around Syntagma Square on their 22nd day of protest on 15 June.

- 1 June – The Greek government criticised Moody's decision to cut its credit rating to Caa1, which brought it seven notches into junk territory, saying the move did not take into account the country's effort to tidy up the country's finances.
- 4 June – Greece hit by further protests in central Athens, as PM Papandreou agreed to make "significant" cuts in public sector employment.
- 9 June – In an open letter to European and international authorities, German finance minister Wolfgang Schäuble said that "Any additional financial support for Greece has to involve a fair burden sharing between taxpayers and private investors."
- 11 June – Jean-Claude Juncker, head of the Eurozone finance ministers, backed Germany's proposal for a "soft restructuring" of Greek debt, but said any contribution from private sector creditors should be "voluntary".
- 15 June – Waiting from both markets and the Greek population turned violent. The failure of European leaders to resolve their disagreements over the Greek debt crisis combined to rattle credit markets.
- 17 June – The French President, Nicolas Sarkozy and the German Chancellor, Angela Merkel agreed to a voluntary Greece bondholder role, backing down from earlier demands that bondholders be forced to shoulder a "substantial" share of a Greek rescue.
- 18 June – Angela Merkel changes her position and confirms she will work with the European Central Bank to resolve the Mediterranean nation's sovereign debt crisis.

=== July ===
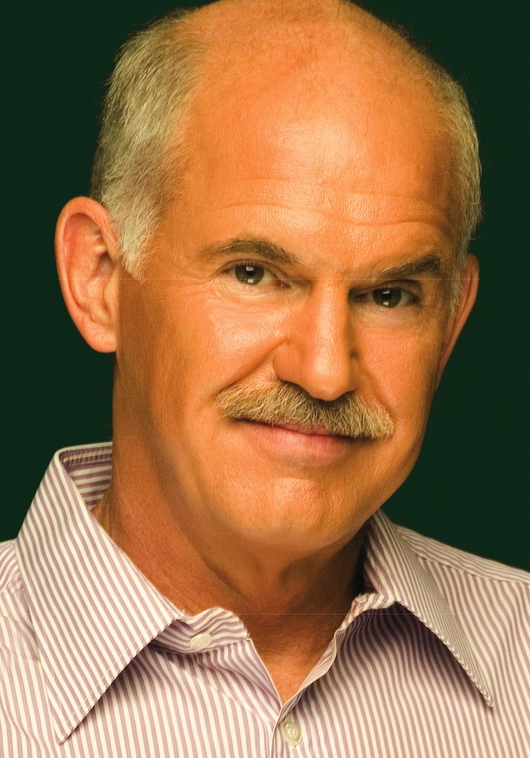
George Papandreou, the previous Prime Minister of Greece

- 21 July – The Council of the European Union reached an agreement on measures aimed at solving the Greek debt crisis.

=== August ===
- ?? – significant purchases of Eurozone sovereign bonds restart under ECB's SMP programme. Spanish and Italian yields breach 6%.
- 18 August – The European stock markets suffered further heavy falls due to persistent fears about the world economic outlook.
- 24 August – The French government unveiled a €12 billion deficit cutting package that raised taxes on the rich and closed some tax loopholes.

=== September ===
- 13 September – An international alarm over a Eurozone crisis grows.
- 21 September – S&P have downgraded seven Italian banks after they've dropped Italy's sovereign rating two days ago.
- 22 September – Greeks reacted with anger and disbelief at a new wave of austerity cuts enacted to keep the country in the Eurozone.
- 24 September – The IMF urged EU leaders to act decisively on Greece to stem the debt crisis.
- 26 September – The US president, Barack Obama, says the debt crisis in Europe is "scaring the world" and that leaders in the Eurozone are not dealing with the issue quickly enough.
- 29 September – The Bundestag approved expanded EU bailout fund, reducing market concerns.

=== October ===
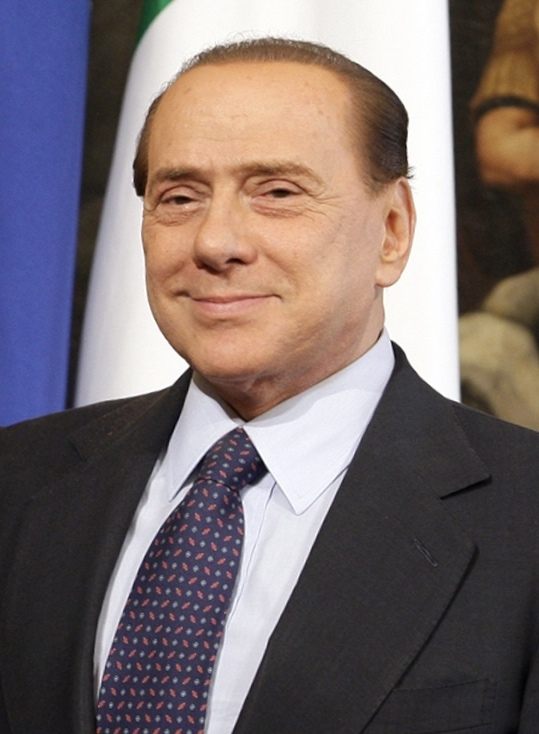
Silvio Berlusconi, a former Prime Minister of Italy

- 4 October – European shares declined for a second day on fears that Franco-Belgian bank Dexia may need to be rescued due to its exposure to Greek debt. Concern increased that the Eurozone sovereign debt crisis is spreading to the banking sector.
- 7 October – Credit ratings agency Fitch cut Italy's credit rating by one notch to A+ from AA− and cut Spain's rating to AA− from AA+.
- 9 October – British PM David Cameron exhorted EU leaders to act more quickly as French and German leaders promised new crisis plan as pressure builds.
- 10 October – Belgium nationalised Dexia Bank Belgium, stricken with Greek debt.
- 13 October – S&P cut Spain's long-term credit rating by one notch from AA to AA− with a negative outlook.
- 28 October:
  - The German government found itself €55 billion richer after a discovery of an accounting error at Hypo Real Estate, the troubled bank it nationalised in 2009.
  - The head of the Eurozone's bailout fund has begun attempts to persuade the People's Republic of China to invest in a scheme to help rescue member countries facing debt crises.

=== November ===
- 1 November – The Greek PM Papandreou has announced a referendum on the new Eurozone debt deal which shocked European markets and had thrown the future of the euro back into disarray.
- 3 November – Prime Minister Papandreouthe withdraws from promised Greek referendum on the bailout package amid heavy pressure from Germany and France.
- 8 November – Italian Prime Minister Silvio Berlusconi said that he will resign of his office after budget reforms were passed, while Italy's cost of borrowing had hit record levels on bond markets.
- 11 November – Italian 10-year borrowing costs fall sharply from 7.5 to 6.7% after Italian legislature approves further austerity measures and the formation of an emergency government to replace that of Prime Minister Silvio Berlusconi.
- 13 November – Silvio Berlusconi resigns as Prime Minister of Italy as a result of the country's debt crisis.
- 15 November – The Lisbon Council publishes the Euro Plus Monitor 2011, which attests the most critical eurozone member countries Greece, Ireland and Spain to be in the process of rapid reforms.
- 21 November – The European Commission suggests "stability bonds" (eurobonds) issued jointly by the 17 euro nations would be an effective way to tackle the financial crisis.
- 25 November – Standard and Poor's downgrades Belgium's long-term sovereign credit rating from AA+ to AA, and 10-year bond yields reach 5.66%.
- 30 November – The European Central Bank, the U.S. Federal Reserve Federal Reserve, the central banks of Canada, Japan, Britain and the Swiss National Bank provide global financial markets with additional liquidity to ward off the debt crisis and to support the real economy. The central banks agree to provide each other with abundant liquidity to make sure that commercial banks stay liquid in other currencies.

=== December ===
- 2 December – Belgian negotiating parties reach an agreement to form a new government. The deal includes spending cuts and tax rises worth about €11 billion, which should bring the budget deficit down to 2.8% of GDP by 2012, and to balance the books in 2015. Following the announcement Belgium 10-year bond yields fell sharply to 4.6%.
- 5 December – The central banks agree to lower the cost of dollar currency swaps by 50 basis points.
- 7 December – The new interim national union government led by Lucas Papademos submits its plans for the 2012 budget, promising to cut its deficit from 9% of GDP 2011 to 5.4% in 2012, mostly due to the write-off of debt held by banks.
- 8 December – Fitch cuts Greece's rating to BBB+ from A−, with a negative outlook.
- 9 December – All 17 members of the eurozone and six countries that aspire to join agree at the European Council meeting on a new intergovernmental treaty to put strict caps on government spending and borrowing, with penalties for those countries who violate the limits. All other non-eurozone countries except Great Britain are also prepared to join in, subject to parliamentary vote.
- 14 December – Greek PM Papandreou outlines the first round of policies to cut deficit and regain investor trust.
- 22 December – Portugal reports its estimated budget deficit of 4.5% in 2011 will be substantially lower than expected and it will meet its 2012 target already a year earlier due to a one-off transfer of pension funds.
  Moody's cuts Greece's rating to A2 from A1.
  The ECB starts the biggest infusion of credit into the European banking system in the euro's 13-year history, loaning €489 billion to 523 banks for an exceptionally long period of three years at a rate of just one per cent.

== 2012 ==
=== January ===
- 13 January – Standard & Poor's downgrades France and Austria from AAA rating, lowers Spain, Italy and five other euro members further, and maintains the top credit rating for Finland, Germany, Luxembourg, and the Netherlands.
- 16 January – S&P downgrades the EFSF from AAA to AA+.
- 30 January – German consulting company Roland Berger says it has started collecting funds from financial institutions and business intelligence agencies to set up an independent non-profit ratings agency by Mid-2012, which could provide its first country ratings by the end of the year.

=== February ===
- 21 February – The Eurogroup finalises the Second bailout package with the private holders of Greek governmental bonds accepting a slightly bigger haircut of 53.5%. EU Member States agree to an additional retroactive lowering of the bailout interest rates and pass on all central bank profits related to Greece until 2020. Altogether this should bring down Greece's debt to 120.5% by 2020.
- 29 February 2012 – The ECB holds a second auction, providing 800 Eurozone banks with further €529.5 billion in cheap loans.

=== May ===
- 6 May – In Greek legislative election, May 2012 no party gains an overall majority, this worsens market falls.
- 13 May – Greece's President tries to form a coalition government.
- 18 May – German Chancellor Angela Merkel allegedly tells the Greek president to hold a referendum on euro memberships. The Bundestag denies this.

== 2013 ==
=== May ===
- 8 May – European Central Bank cuts its bank rate to 0.50% to aid recovery. Marginal lending rate (including Emergency Liquidity Assistance rate) to 1.00%

=== November ===
- 7 November – European Central Bank cuts its bank rate to 0.25% to aid recovery. Deposit rate stays at 0.00%.

== 2014 ==
=== June ===
- First foray into a negative interest rate territory. Deposit rate cut to −0.10%, main refi rate to +0.15%, marginal lending rate to 0.40%

=== September ===
- Deposit rate cut to −0.20%, main refi rate to +0.05%, marginal lending rate to 0.30%

=== October ===
- Discussions over insufficiency of ECB ABSPP and CBPP3, potential for Sov Purchases.
- ECB in ECJ over legality of OMT could prevent further sovereign purchases. Greece yields hit by 75bp intraday, and largest rates move in G3 markets since 2011.
- Greek government coalition weakens in opinion polls, left Syriza strengthens with knock-on effect to debt restructuring and own currency plans.

== See also ==
- Greek government-debt crisis
- Post-2008 Irish economic downturn
- 2008–15 Spanish financial crisis
- 2008–11 Icelandic financial crisis
- 2008–09 Belgian financial crisis
- 2010–12 Greek protests
- European Financial Stabilisation Mechanism
- Late-2000s recession in Europe
- 1980s austerity policy in Romania
- Latin American debt crisis
