= 20 euro note =

Euro banknote

Twenty euro
- Country: Eurozone (mainly) and other countries
- Value: 20 euro
- Width: 133 mm
- Height: 72 mm
- Security features: First series: hologram stripe with perforations, reflective glossy stripe, EURion constellation, watermarks, microprinting, ultraviolet ink, raised printing, security thread, matted surface, see-through number, barcodes and serial number Europa series: portrait watermark, portrait hologram, portrait window, emerald number
- Material used: 100% pure cotton fibre
- Years of printing: 1999–2014 (1st series); Since 2014 (Europa series)

Obverse
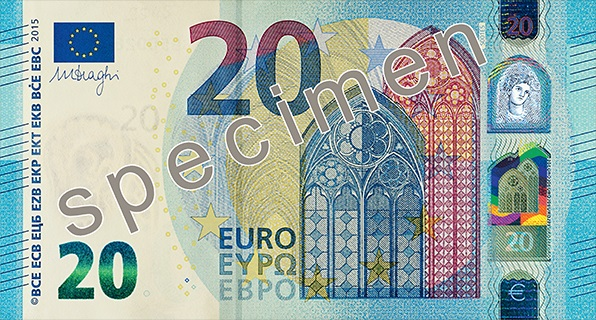
- Design: Window in Gothic architecture
- Designer: Robert Kalina (1st series); Reinhold Gerstetter (Europa series)
- Design date: 3 December 1996 (1st series); 24 February 2015 (Europa series)

Reverse
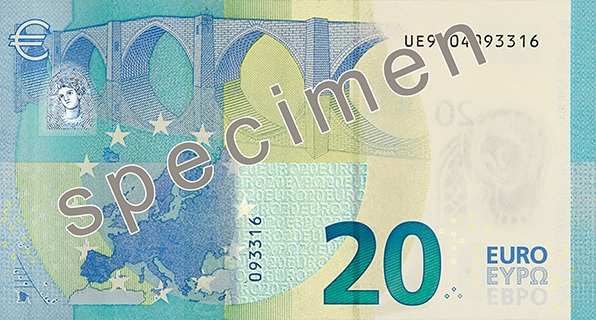
- Design: Bridge in Gothic architecture and map of Europe
- Designer: Robert Kalina (1st series); Reinhold Gerstetter (Europa series)
- Design date: 3 December 1996 (1st series); 24 February 2015 (Europa series)

The twenty-euro note (€20) is the third-lowest value euro banknote and has been used since the introduction of the euro (in its cash form) in 2002.

The note is the official currency of 21 of the 27 member states of the European Union, which are part of the Eurozone. The 21 Eurozone members are: Austria, Belgium, Bulgaria, Croatia, Cyprus, Estonia, Finland, France, Germany, Greece, Ireland, Italy, Latvia, Lithuania, Luxembourg, Malta, the Netherlands, Portugal, Slovakia, Slovenia, and Spain.

A number of non-EU member states, namely Andorra, Monaco, San Marino, and Vatican City have formal agreements with the EU to use the euro as their official currency and issue their own coins. In addition, Kosovo and Montenegro have adopted the euro unilaterally.

The countries that use the euro have a total population of about 350 million currently. In April 2026, there were approximately 4,992,000,000 twenty euro banknotes in circulation around the eurozone. It is the second most widely circulated denomination, accounting for 16.3% of the total banknotes. Estimates suggest that the average life of a twenty euro banknote is about two years before it is replaced due to wear.

It is the third-smallest note, measuring 133 x 72 mm with a blue colour scheme. The twenty euro banknotes depict bridges and arches/doorways in Gothic architecture (between the 13th and 14th centuries). The twenty euro note contains several complex security features such as watermarks, invisible ink, holograms and microprinting that document its authenticity.

The design of the Europa series 20 euro banknote was revealed on 24 February 2015 and launched on 25 November 2015.

== History ==
The euro was founded on 1 January 1999, when it became the currency of over 300 million people in Europe. For the first three years of its existence it was an invisible currency, only used in accountancy. Euro cash was not introduced until 1 January 2002, when it replaced the national banknotes and coins of the countries in eurozone 12, such as the Belgian franc and the Greek drachma.

Slovenia joined the Eurozone on 1 January 2007, Cyprus and Malta on 1 January 2008, Slovakia on 1 January 2009, Estonia on 1 January 2011, Latvia on 1 January 2014, Lithuania on 1 January 2015, Croatia on 1 January 2023 and Bulgaria on 1 January 2026.

=== The changeover period ===
The changeover period during which the former currencies' notes and coins were exchanged for those of the euro lasted about two months, going from 1 January 2002 until 28 February 2002. The official date on which the national currencies ceased to be legal tender varied from member state to member state. The earliest date was in Germany, where the mark officially ceased to be legal tender on 31 December 2001, though the exchange period lasted for two months more. Even after the old currencies ceased to be legal tender, they continued to be accepted by national central banks for periods ranging from ten years to forever.

=== Changes ===
Design for the first series of twenty euro notes

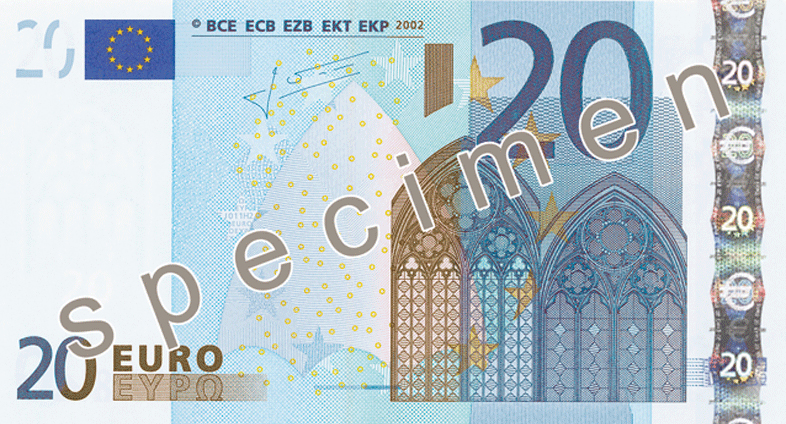
Obverse

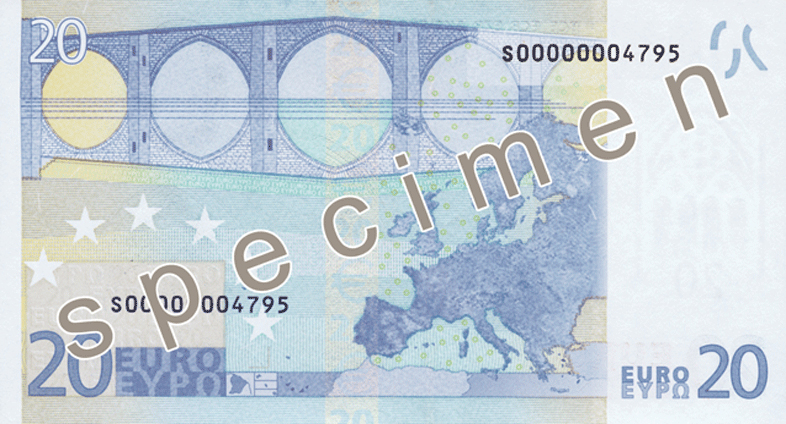
Reverse

Notes printed before November 2003 bear the signature of the first President of the European Central Bank, Wim Duisenberg, who was replaced on 1 November 2003 by Jean-Claude Trichet, whose signature appears on issues from November 2003 to March 2012. Notes issued from March 2012 to July 2020 bear the signature of the third President, Mario Draghi. Notes issued since July 2020 bear the signature of the fourth President, Christine Lagarde.

Until May 2013 there was only one series of euro notes, however a new series, similar to the first one, was planned to be released. The bank notes would be replaced in ascending order. Therefore, the first new note was the five-euro note that has been in circulation since 2 May 2013. Its new design was made public on 10 January 2013 in the Archaeological Museum of Frankfurt (Germany). While broadly similar to the previous notes, minor design changes include an updated map and a hologram of Europa. Moreover, the new notes reflect the expansion of the European Union; the previous issues do not include the members Cyprus and Malta (Cyprus is off the map to the east and Malta was too small to be depicted). It would be the first time in which the Bulgarian Cyrillic alphabet would be used on the banknotes as a result of Bulgaria joining the European Union in 2007. Therefore, the new series of Euro banknotes would include "ЕВРО", which is the Bulgarian spelling for EURO as well as the abbreviation "ЕЦБ" (short for Европейска централна банка in Bulgarian).

The design of the Europa series 20 euro banknote was revealed on 24 February 2015 and launched on 25 November 2015. Banknotes from the first series are legal tender and will always retain their value. They will continue to circulate alongside the Europa series until the remaining stocks have been used up.

A third series of banknotes, with an entirely new design, is due to be issued by the ECB starting in the late 2020s. Two themes for the new design, "European culture" and "Rivers and birds" were presented in November 2023, with the motifs chosen for each theme and denomination and theme being presented in January 2025. If the former theme is chosen, twenty-euro notes will depict the Polish and French scientist Marie Curie (née Skłodowska) on the obverse, and a teacher with students in a classroom on the reverse. If the latter theme is chosen, they will depict a colony of bee-eaters in a large valley on the obverse, and the seat of the European Central Bank on the reverse.

== Design ==
20 euro banknote under fluorescent light (UV-A)

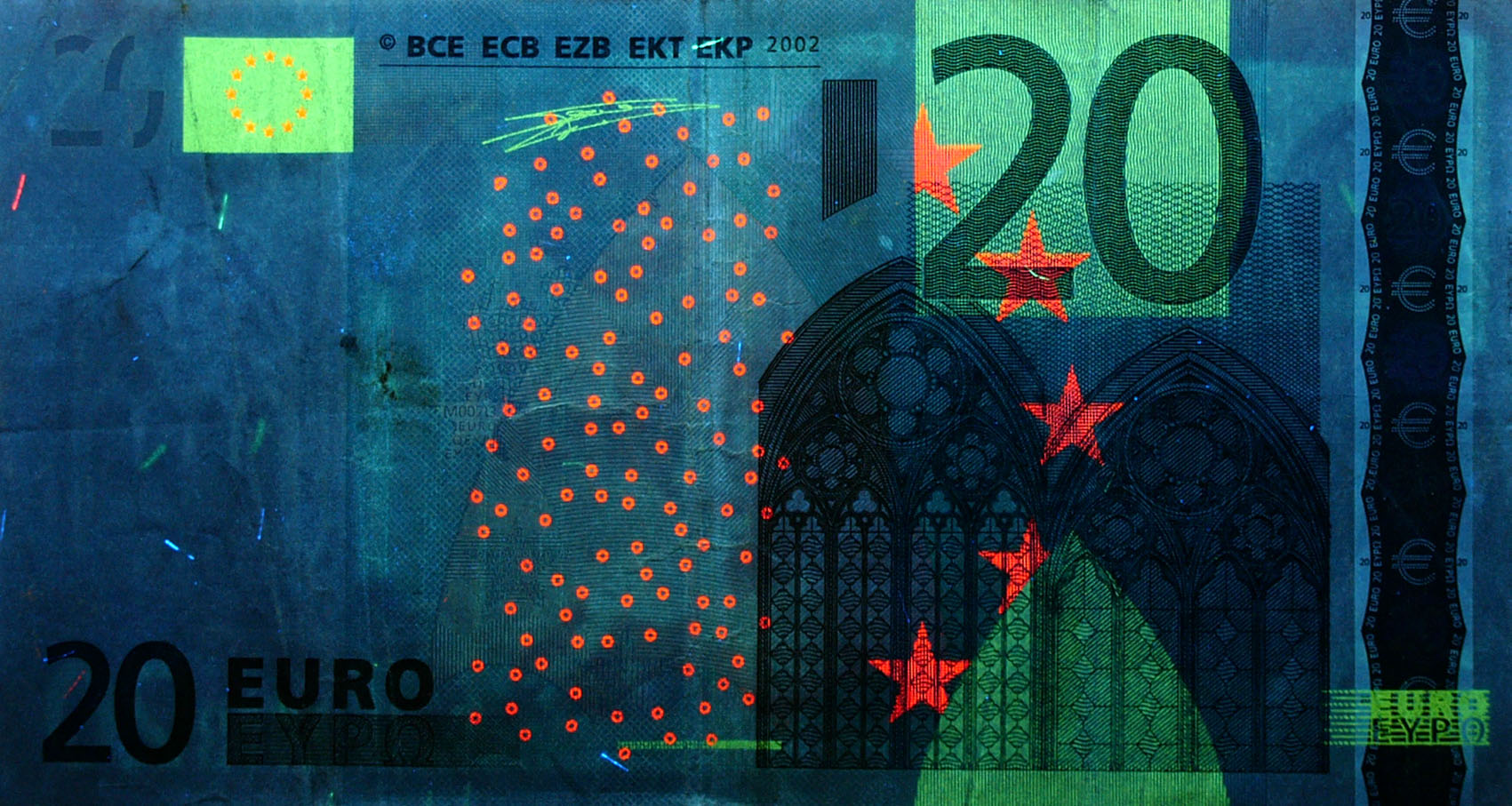
Obverse

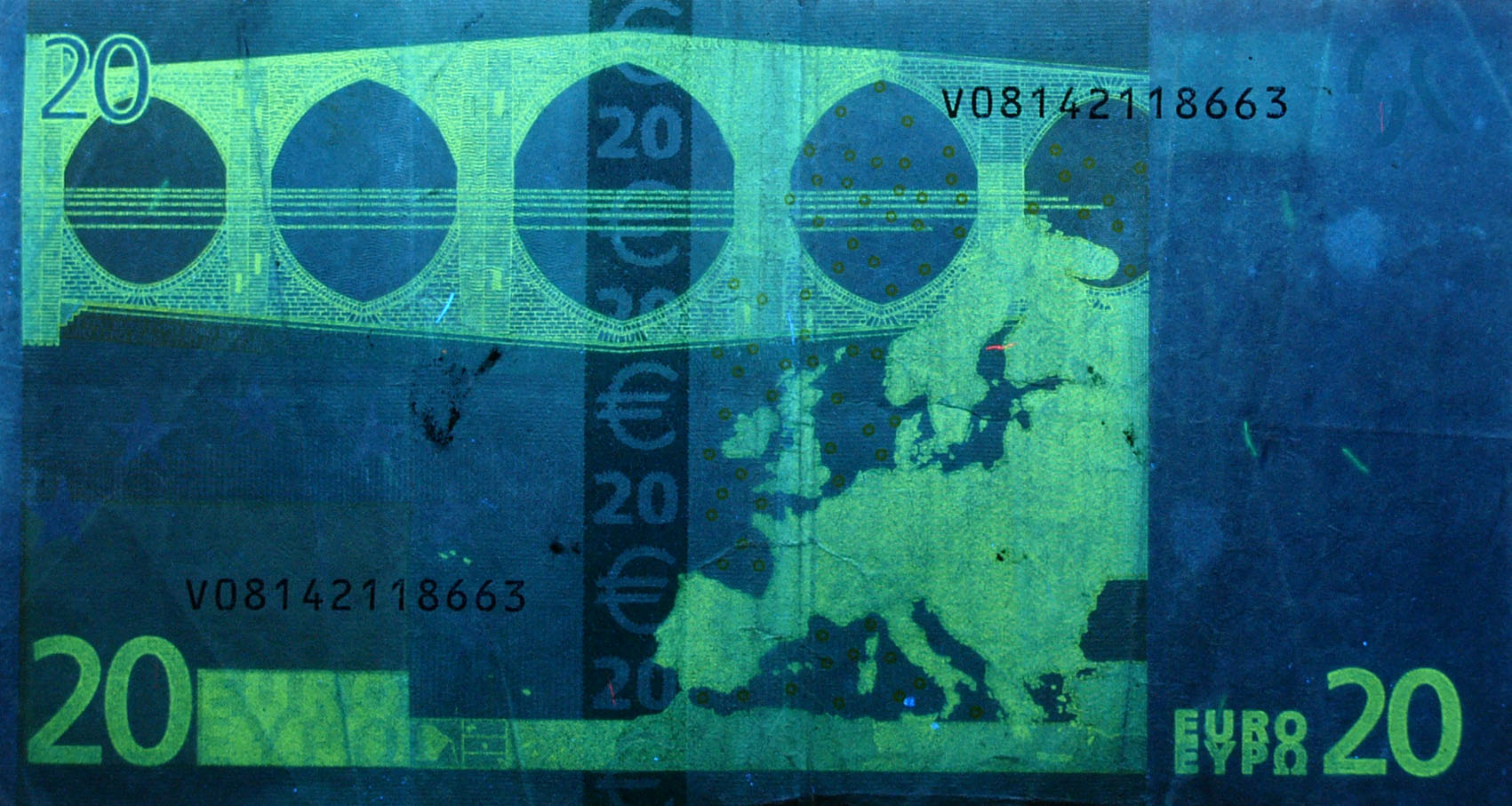
Reverse

The twenty euro note is the third smallest euro note at 133 millimetres (5.2 in) × 72 millimetres (2.8 in) with a blue colour scheme. All bank notes depict bridges and arches/doorways in a different historical European style; the twenty euro note shows the gothic era (between the 13th and 14th centuries). Although Robert Kalina's original designs were intended to show real monuments, for political reasons the bridge and art are merely hypothetical examples of the architectural era.

Like all euro notes, it contains the denomination, the EU flag, the signature of the president of the ECB and the initials of said bank in different EU languages, a map of Europe, a depiction of EU territories overseas, the stars from the EU flag and thirteen security features as listed below.

The ECB released a game on 5 February 2015 to discover some of the new security features embedded in the new €20 note. The most significant new anti-counterfeit measure is a transparent window, containing a hologram which shows a portrait of Europa and the number 20. The Europa series design of the 20 euro note was officially revealed on 24 February 2015.

=== Security features (first series) ===
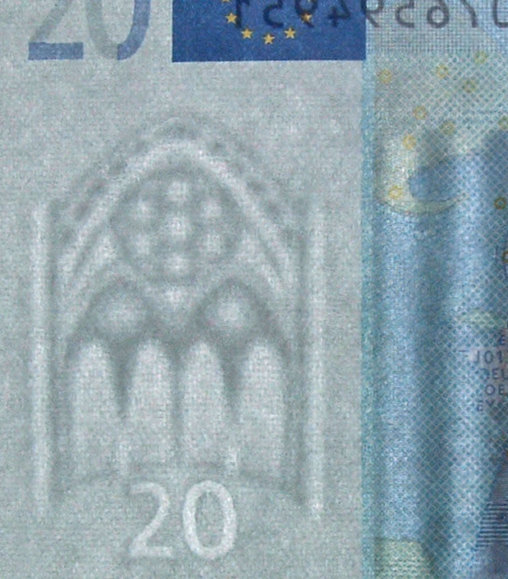
The watermark on the 20 euro note

As a lower value note, the security features of the twenty euro note are not as high as the other denominations; however, it is protected by:

- A hologram, tilt the note and one should see the hologram image change between the value and a window or doorway, but in the background, one should see rainbow-coloured concentric circles of micro-letters moving from the centre to the edges of the patch.
- The EURion constellation.
- A special printing processes give the euro notes their unique feel.
- A glossy stripe, tilt the note and a glossy stripe showing the value numeral and the euro symbol will appear.
- Watermarks, it appears when the banknote is against the light.
- Raised printing, special methods of printing makes the ink feel raised or thicker in the main image, the lettering and the value numerals on the front of the banknotes. To feel the raised print, run your finger over it or scratch it gently with your fingernail.
- Ultraviolet ink, Under ultraviolet light, the paper itself should not glow, fibres embedded in the paper should appear, and should be coloured red, blue and green, the European Union flag looks green and has orange stars, the ECB President signature turns green, the large stars and small circles on the front glow and the European map, a bridge and the value numeral on the back appear in yellow.
- Microprinting, On numerous areas of the banknotes you can see microprinting, for example, inside the "ΕΥΡΩ" (EURO in Greek characters) on the front. You will need a magnifying glass to see it. The tiny text is sharp, and not blurred.
- A security thread, The security thread is embedded in the banknote paper. Hold the banknote against the light – the thread will appear as a dark stripe. The word "EURO" and the value can be seen in tiny letters on the stripe.
- Perforations, Hold the banknote against the light. You should see perforations in the hologram which will form the € symbol. You should also see small numbers showing the value.
- A matted surface, the note paper is made out of pure cotton, which feels crisp and firm, but not limp or waxy.
- Barcodes.
- A serial number.

=== Security features (Europa series) ===
- Watermark: When the note is held under a normal light source, a portrait of Europa and an electrotype denomination appear on either side.
- Portrait Window: When the note is held against the light, the window in the hologram becomes transparent and reveals a portrait of Europa, which is visible on both sides of the note.
- Portrait Hologram: When the note is tilted, the hologram – the silver-coloured stripe on the right of the note – reveals a portrait of Europa as well as the "€" symbol, the main image and the value of the banknote.
- Emerald Number: When the note is tilted, the number "20" on the bottom left corner of the note displays an effect of the light that moves up and down. The number "20" also changes colour from emerald green to deep blue.
- Glossy stripe: When the note is tilted, a glossy stripe, situated at the back of the note, showing the value numeral and the euro symbol appears golden or nearly invisible, depending on viewing angle.
- Security Thread: When the note is held to the light, the security thread appears as a dark line. The "€" symbol and the value of the note can be seen in tiny white lettering in the stripe.
- Microprinting: Some areas of the banknote feature a series of tiny letters. The microprinting can be read with a magnifying glass. The letters are sharp, not blurred.
- Ultraviolet ink: Some parts of the banknote shine when under UV or UV-C light. These are the stars in the flag, the small circles, the large stars and several other areas on the front. On the back, a quarter of a circle in the centre as well as several other areas glow green. The horizontal serial number and a stripe appear in red.
- Infrared light: Under infrared light, the emerald number, the right side of the main image and the silvery stripe are visible on the obverse of the banknote, while on the reverse, only the denomination and the horizontal serial number are visible.

== Circulation ==
The European Central Bank is closely monitoring the circulation and stock of the euro coins and banknotes. It is a task of the Eurosystem to ensure an efficient and smooth supply of euro notes and to maintain their integrity throughout the euro area.

In December 2025, there were 5,018,391,853 €20 banknotes in circulation around the Eurozone. for €100,367,837,060.

This is a net number, i.e. the number of banknotes issued by the Eurosystem central banks, without further distinction as to who is holding the currency issued, thus also including the stocks held by credit institutions.

Besides the date of the introduction of the first set to January 2002, the publication of figures is more significant through the maximum number of banknotes raised each year. The number is higher the end of the year.

The figures are as follows (3 Nov 2017):

Date	Banknotes	€ Value	Date	Banknotes	€ Value
January 2002	1,961,761,089	39,235,221,780	December 2008	2,617,914,839	52,358,296,780
December 2002	1,974,764,476	39,495,289,520	December 2009	2,690,208,898	53,804,177,960
December 2003	2,053,751,069	41,075,021,380	December 2010	2,751,808,438	55,036,168,760
December 2004	2,079,431,718	41,588,634,360	December 2011	2,853,452,345	57,069,046,900
December 2005	2,159,677,359	43,193,547,180	December 2012	2,988,384,283	59,767,685,660
December 2006	2,336,568,793	46,731,375,860	December 2013	3,088,833,405	61,776,668,100
December 2007	2,467,676,850	49,353,537,000	December 2014	3,233,284,025	64,665,680,500

In November 2015, a new 'Europe' series was issued.

The first series of notes were issued in conjunction with those for a few weeks in the series 'Europe' until existing stocks are exhausted, then gradually withdrawn from circulation. Both series thus run parallel but the proportion tends inevitably to a sharp decrease in the first series.

Date	Banknotes	€ Value	Series '1' remainder	€ Value	Proportion
December 2015	3,439,563,088	68,791,261,760	2,814,523,557	56,290,471,140	81,8%
December 2016	3,590,492,061	71,809,841,220	1,336,184,040	26,723,680,800	37,2%
December 2017	3,829,512,086	76,590,241,720	943,462,935	18,869,258,700	24.6%
December 2018	4,020,474,877	80,409,497,540	744,039,941	14,880,798,820	18.5%
December 2019	4,190,497,224	83,809,944,480	624,415,397	12,488,307,940	14.9%
December 2020	4,498,520,808	89,970,416,160	560,639,492	11,212,789,840	12.5%
December 2021	4,646,581,743	92,931,634,860	515,951,168	10,319,023,360	11.1%
December 2022	4,805,243,241	96,104,864,820	464,955,889	9,299,117,780	9.7%
December 2023	4,858,043,996	97,160,879,920	421,546,239	8,430,924,780	8.7%
December 2024	4,931,353,356	98,627,067,120	384,119,963	7,682,399,260	7.8%
December 2025	5,018,391,853	100,367,837,060	352,966,330	7,059,326,600	7.0%

The latest figures provided by the ECB are the following:

Date	Banknotes	€ Value	Series '1' remainder	€ Value	Proportion
April 2026	4,992,407,122	99,848,142,440	342,524,457	6,850,489,140	6.9%

== Legal information ==
Legally, both the European Central Bank and the central banks of the eurozone countries have the right to issue the seven different euro banknotes. In practice, only the national central banks of the zone physically issue and withdraw euro banknotes. The European Central Bank does not have a cash office and is not involved in any cash operations.

== Tracking ==
There are several communities of people at European level, an example of which is EuroBillTracker, that, as a hobby, keep track of the euro banknotes that pass through their hands, to record and know where they travel or have travelled. The aim is to record as many notes as possible to know details about their spread, like from where and to where they travel in general, follow it up, like where a bill has been seen in particular, and generate statistics and rankings, for example, in which countries there are more bills. EuroBillTracker has registered over 155 million notes as of May 2016, worth more than €2.897 billion.
