= 10 euro note =

Euro banknote

Ten euro
- Country: Eurozone (mainly) and other countries
- Value: 10 euro
- Width: 127 mm
- Height: 67 mm
- Security features: First series: hologram stripe with perforations, reflective glossy stripe, EURion constellation, watermarks, raised printing, microprinting, ultraviolet ink, security thread, matted surface, see-through number, barcodes and serial number Europa series: portrait watermark, portrait hologram, emerald number
- Material used: Cotton fibre
- Years of printing: 1999–2013 (1st series); Since 2013 (Europa series)

Obverse
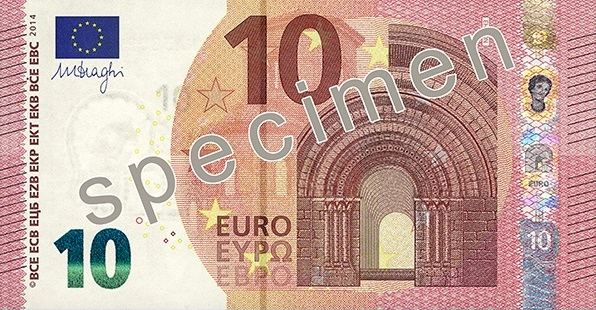
- Design: Arch in romanesque architecture
- Designer: Robert Kalina (1st series); Reinhold Gerstetter (Europa series)
- Design date: 3 December 1996 (1st series); 13 January 2014 (Europa series)

Reverse
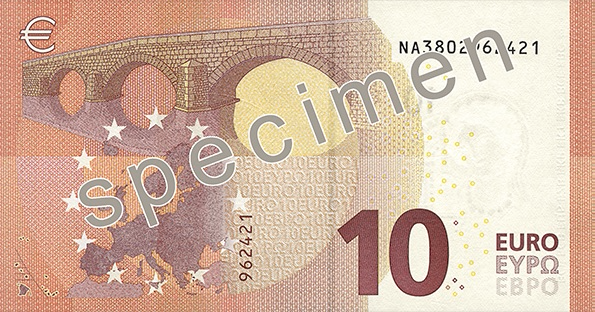
- Design: Bridge in romanesque architecture and map of Europe
- Designer: Robert Kalina (1st series); Reinhold Gerstetter (Europa series)
- Design date: 3 December 1996 (1st series); 13 January 2014 (Europa series)

The ten-euro note (€10) is the second-lowest value euro banknote and has been used since the introduction of the euro (in its cash form) in 2002.

The note is the official currency of 21 of the 27 member states of the European Union, which are part of the Eurozone. The 21 Eurozone members are: Austria, Belgium, Bulgaria, Croatia, Cyprus, Estonia, Finland, France, Germany, Greece, Ireland, Italy, Latvia, Lithuania, Luxembourg, Malta, the Netherlands, Portugal, Slovakia, Slovenia, and Spain.

A number of non-EU member states, namely Andorra, Monaco, San Marino, and Vatican City have formal agreements with the EU to use the euro as their official currency and issue their own coins. In addition, Kosovo and Montenegro have adopted the euro unilaterally.

The countries that use the euro have a total population of about 350 million currently. In April 2026, there were approximately 3 198 000 000 ten euro banknotes in circulation around the eurozone. It is the fourth most widely circulated denomination, accounting for 10.2% of the total banknotes. Estimates suggest that the average life of a ten euro banknote is about 1.5 years before it is replaced due to wear.

It is the second-smallest note measuring 127 × 67 mm with a pink colour scheme. The ten euro banknotes depict bridges and arches/doorways in romanesque architecture (between the 11th and 12th centuries). The ten euro note contains several complex security features such as watermarks, invisible ink, holograms and microprinting that document its authenticity.

The design of the Europa series 10 euro banknote was revealed on 13 January 2014 and launched on 23 September 2014.

== History ==
The euro was founded on 1 January 1999, when it became the currency of over 300 million people in Europe. For the first three years of its existence it was an invisible currency, only used in accountancy. euro cash was not introduced until 1 January 2002, when it replaced the national banknotes and coins of the countries in eurozone 12, such as the Italian lira and the German mark.

Slovenia joined the eurozone on 1 January 2007, Cyprus and Malta on 1 January 2008, Slovakia on 1 January 2009, Estonia on 1 January 2011, Latvia on 1 January 2014, Lithuania on 1 January 2015, Croatia on 1 January 2023 and Bulgaria on 1 January 2026.

=== The changeover period ===
The changeover period during which the former currencies' notes and coins were exchanged for those of the euro lasted about two months, going from 1 January 2002 until 28 February 2002. The official date on which the national currencies ceased to be legal tender varied from member state to member state. The earliest date was in Germany, where the mark officially ceased to be legal tender on 31 December 2001, though the exchange period lasted for two months more. Even after the old currencies ceased to be legal tender, they continued to be accepted by national central banks for periods ranging from ten years to forever.

=== Changes ===
Design for the first series of ten euro notes

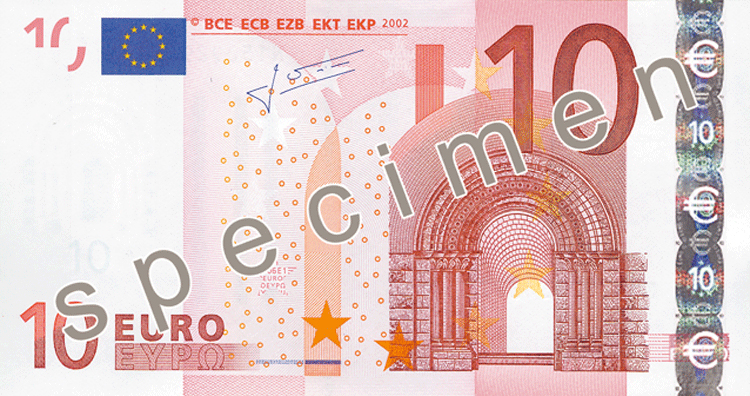
Obverse

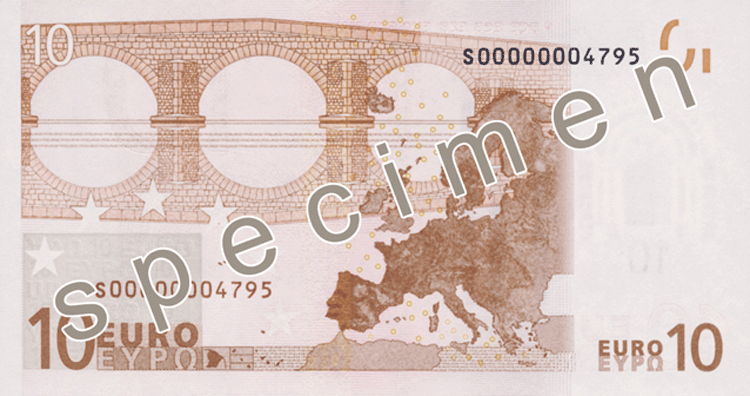
Reverse

Notes printed before November 2003 bear the signature of the first President of the European Central Bank, Wim Duisenberg, who was replaced on 1 November 2003 by Jean-Claude Trichet, whose signature appears on issues from November 2003 to March 2012. Notes issued from March 2012 to July 2020 bear the signature of the third President, Mario Draghi. Notes issued since July 2020 bear the signature of the fourth President, Christine Lagarde.

Until May 2013 there was only one series of euro notes, however a new series, similar to the first one, was planned to be released. The bank notes would be replaced in ascending order. Therefore, the first new note was the five-euro note that has been in circulation since 2 May 2013. Its new design was made public on 10 January 2013 in the Archaeological Museum of Frankfurt (Germany). While broadly similar to the previous notes, minor design changes include an updated map and a hologram of Europa. Moreover, the new notes reflect the expansion of the European Union; the previous issues do not include the members Cyprus and Malta (Cyprus is off the map to the east and Malta was too small to be depicted). It would be the first time in which the Bulgarian Cyrillic alphabet would be used on the banknotes as a result of Bulgaria joining the European Union in 2007. Therefore, the new series of Euro banknotes would include "ЕВРО", which is the Bulgarian spelling for EURO as well as the abbreviation "ЕЦБ" (short for Европейска централна банка in Bulgarian).

The design of the Europa series 10 euro banknote was revealed on 13 January 2014 and launched on 23 September 2014. Banknotes from the first series are legal tender and will always retain their value. They will continue to circulate alongside the Europa series until the remaining stocks have been used up.

A third series of banknotes, with an entirely new design, is due to be issued by the ECB starting in the late 2020s. Two themes for the new design, "European culture" and "Rivers and birds" were presented in November 2023, with the motifs chosen for each theme and denomination and theme being presented in January 2025. If the former theme is chosen, ten-euro notes will depict the German composer Ludwig van Beethoven on the obverse, and a choir singing at a song festival on the reverse. If the latter theme is chosen, they will depict a kingfisher in a waterfall on the obverse, and the seat of the European Commission on the reverse.

== Design ==
10 euro banknote under fluorescent light (UV-A)

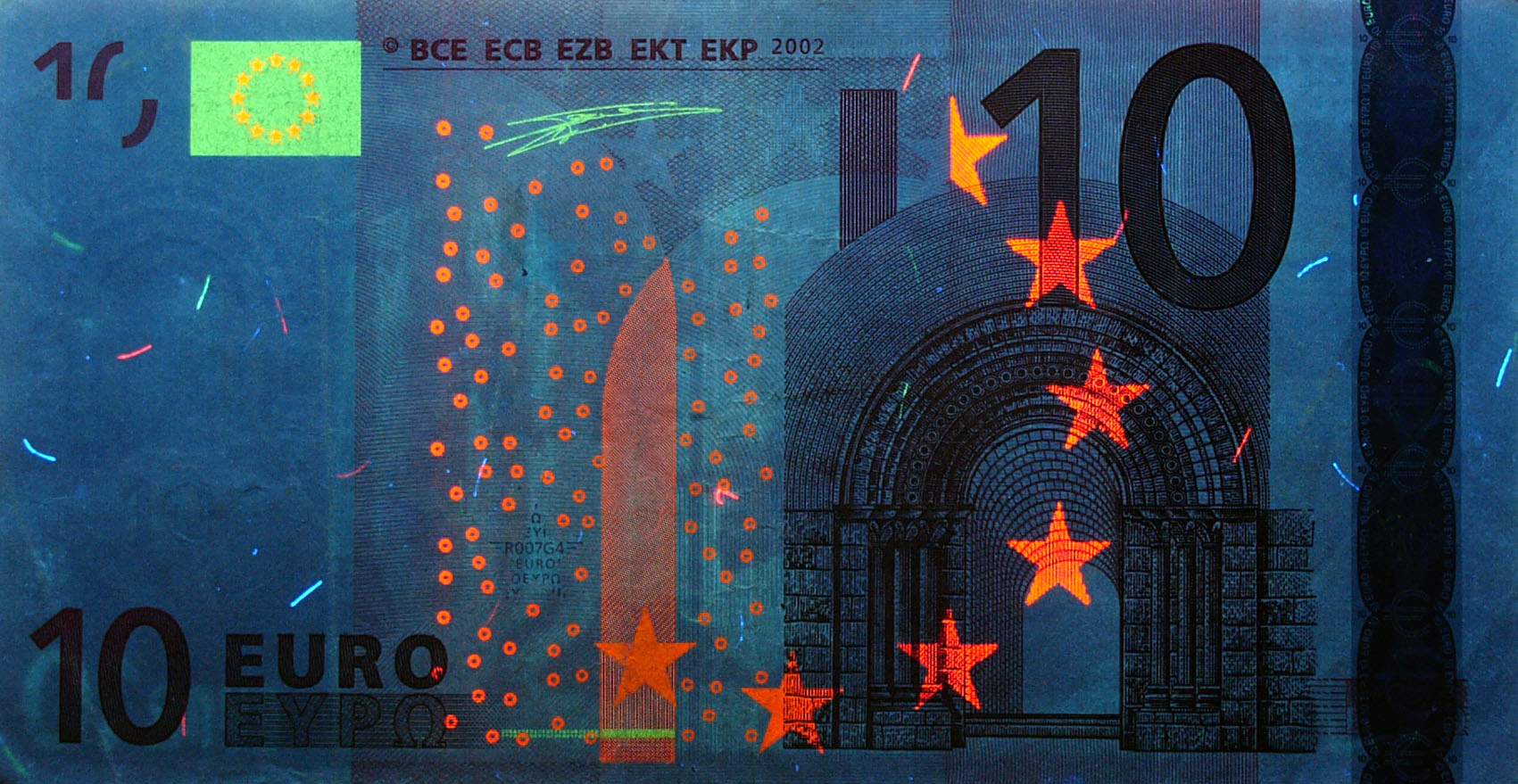
Obverse

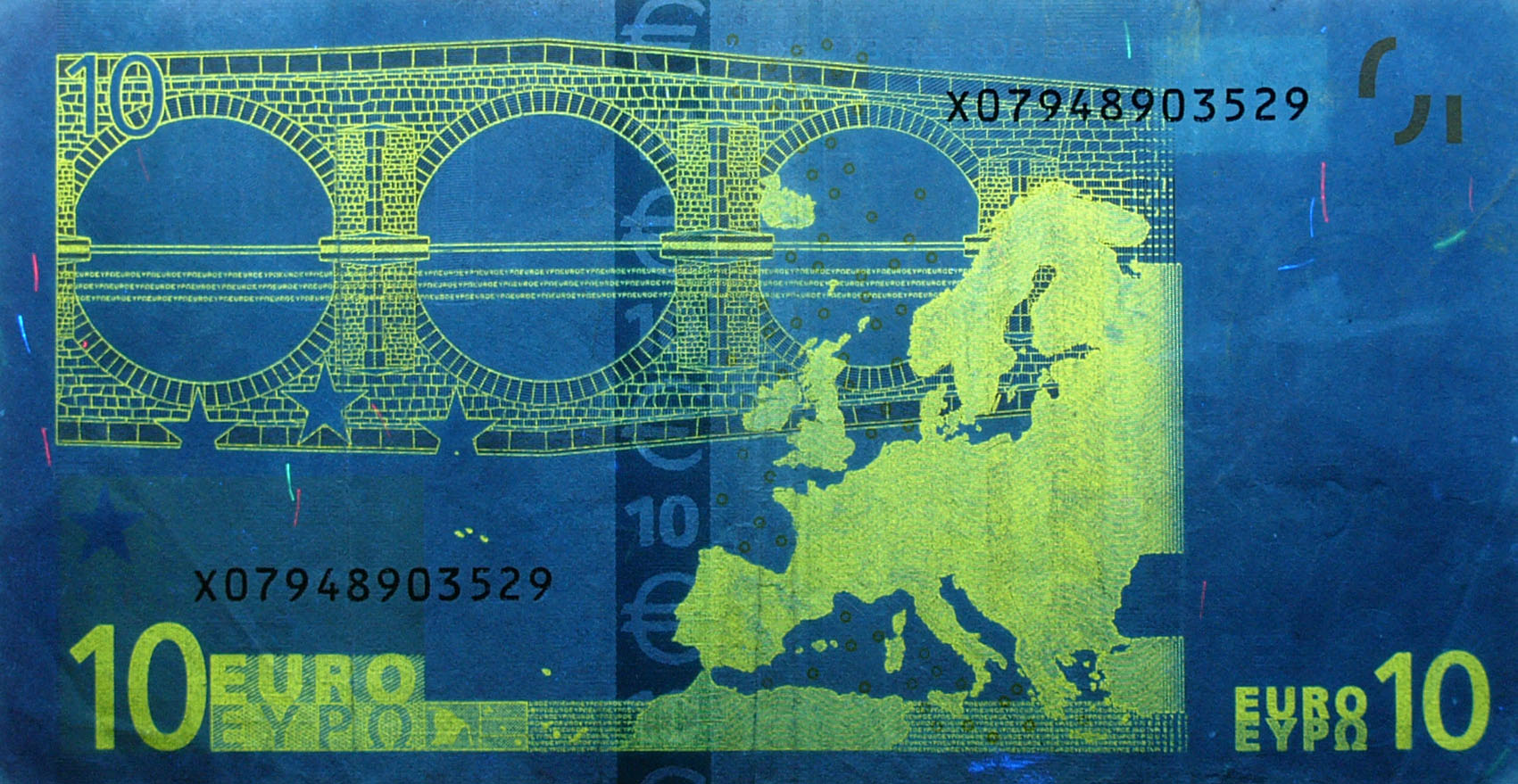
Reverse

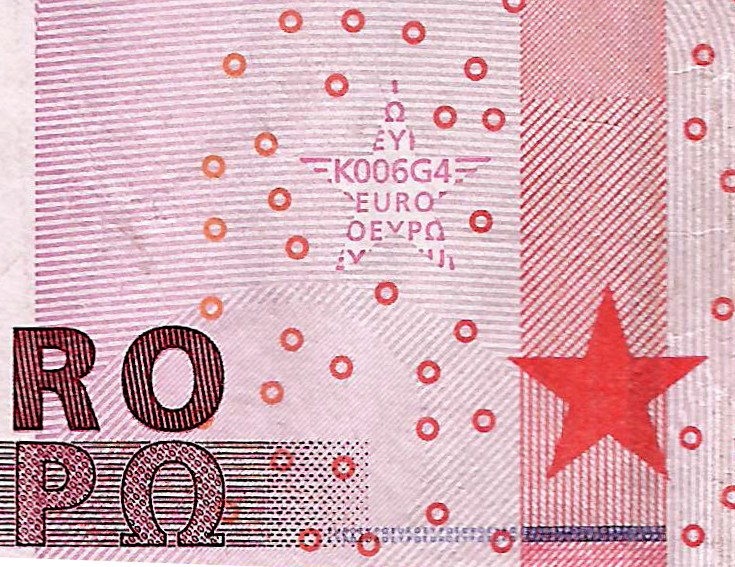
Close up of the printer code on the 10 euro note, showing micro printing, raised lettering and EURion design

The ten euro note is the second smallest at 127 millimetres (5.0 in) × 67 millimetres (2.6 in) with a red colour scheme. All bank notes depict bridges and arches/doorways in a different historical European style; the ten euro note shows the Romanesque era (between the 11th and 12th centuries). Although Robert Kalina's original designs were intended to show real monuments, for political reasons the bridge and art are merely hypothetical examples of the architectural era.

Like all euro notes, it contains the denomination, the EU flag, the signature of the president of the ECB and the initials of said bank in different EU languages, a map of Europe, a depiction of EU territories overseas, the stars from the EU flag and twelve security features as listed below.

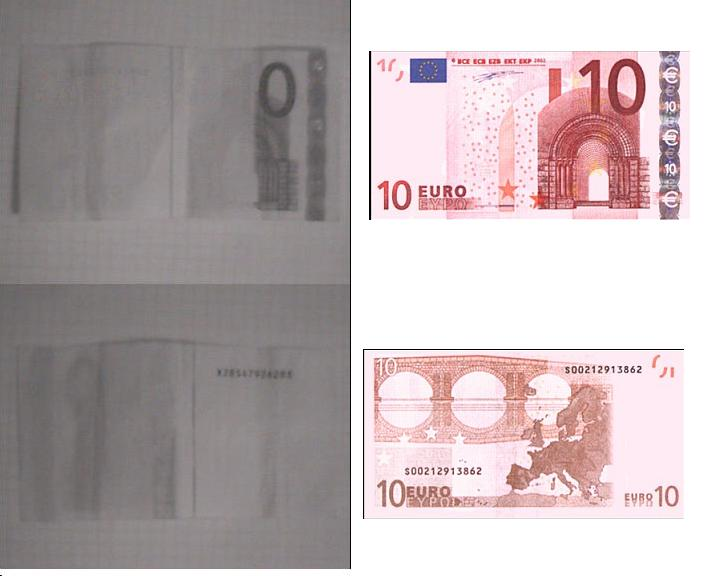
Comparison of a note under infrared light (left), and a note under normal light (right)

=== Security features (first series) ===
As a lower value note, the security features of the ten euro note are not as high as the other denominations, however, it is protected by:

- A hologram, tilt the note and one should see the hologram image change between the value and a window or doorway, but in the background, one should see rainbow-coloured concentric circles of micro-letters moving from the centre to the edges of the patch.
- A EURion constellation,
- Special printing processes give the euro notes their unique feel.
- A glossy stripe, tilt the note and a glossy stripe showing the value numeral and the euro symbol will appear.
- Watermarks, it appears when the banknote is against the light.
- Raised printing, special methods of printing makes the ink feel raised or thicker in the main image, the lettering and the value numerals on the front of the banknotes. To feel the raised print, run your finger over it or scratch it gently with your fingernail.
- Ultraviolet ink, Under ultraviolet light, the paper itself should not glow, fibres embedded in the paper should appear, and should be coloured red, blue and green, the European Union flag looks green and has orange stars, the ECB President signature turns green, the large stars and small circles on the front glow and the European map, a bridge and the value numeral on the back appear in yellow.
- Microprinting, On numerous areas of the banknotes you can see microprinting, for example, inside the "ΕΥΡΩ" (EURO in Greek characters) on the front. You will need a magnifying glass to see it. The tiny text is sharp, and not blurred.
- A security thread, The security thread is embedded in the banknote paper. Hold the banknote against the light - the thread will appear as a dark stripe. The word "EURO" and the value can be seen in tiny letters on the stripe.
- Perforations, Hold the banknote against the light. You should see perforations in the hologram which will form the € symbol. You should also see small numbers showing the value.
- A matted surface, the note paper is made out of pure cotton, which feels crisp and firm, but not limp or waxy.
- Barcodes,
- A serial number.

=== Security features (Europa series) ===
- Watermark: When the note is held under a normal light source, a portrait of Europa and an electrotype denomination appear on either side.
- Portrait Hologram: When the note is tilted, the silver-coloured holographic stripe reveals the portrait of Europa-the same one as in the watermark. The stripe also reveals a window and the value of the banknote.
- Emerald Number: When the note is tilted, the number on the note displays an effect of light that moves up and down. The number also changes colour from emerald green to deep blue.
- Raised Printing: On the front of the note, there is a series of short raised lines on the left and right edges. The main edge, the lettering and the large value numeral also feel thicker.
- Security Thread: When the note is held against the light, the security thread appears as a dark line. The Euro symbol (€) and the value of the banknote can be seen in tiny white lettering in the thread.
- Microprint: Tiny letters which can be read with a magnifying glass. The letters should be sharp, not blurred.
- Ultraviolet ink: Some parts of the banknote shine when under UV or UV-C light. These are the stars in the flag, the small circles, the large stars and several other areas on the front. On the back, a quarter of a circle in the centre as well as several other areas glow green. The horizontal serial number and a stripe appear in red.
- Infrared light: Under infrared light, the emerald number, the right side of the main image and the silvery stripe are visible on the obverse of the banknote, while on the reverse, only the denomination and the horizontal serial number are visible.

== Circulation ==
The European Central Bank is closely monitoring the circulation and stock of the euro coins and banknotes. It is a task of the Eurosystem to ensure an efficient and smooth supply of euro notes and to maintain their integrity throughout the euro area.

In December 2025, there were 3,204,664,144 ten euro banknotes in circulation around the eurozone. for €32,046,641,440.

This is a net number, i.e. the number of banknotes issued by the Eurosystem central banks, without further distinction as to who is holding the currency issued, thus also including the stocks held by credit institutions.

Besides the date of the introduction of the first set to January 2002, the publication of figures is more significant through the maximum number of banknotes raised each year. The number is higher the end of the year, except for this note in 2002.

The figures are as follows (3 November 2017):

Date	Banknotes	€ Value	Date	Banknotes	€ Value
January 2002	1,999,737,481	19,997,374,810	December 2008	2,029,872,213	20,298,722,130
December 2003	1,684,604,749	16,846,047,490	December 2009	2,042,277,282	20,422,772,820
December 2004	1,700,450,847	17,004,508,470	December 2010	2,039,265,727	20,392,657,270
December 2005	1,761,362,710	17,613,627,100	December 2011	2,072,931,644	20,729,316,440
December 2006	1,900,510,721	19,005,107,210	December 2012	2,170,679,774	21,706,797,740
December 2007	1,965,455,883	19,654,558,830	December 2013	2,155,551,029	21,555,510,290

In September 2014, a new 'Europe' series was issued.

The first series of notes were issued in conjunction with those for a few weeks in the series 'Europe' until existing stocks are exhausted, then gradually withdrawn from circulation. Both series thus run parallel but the proportion tends inevitably to a sharp decrease in the first series.

Date	Banknotes	€ Value	Series '1' remainder	€ Value	Proportion
December 2014	2,244,302,134	22,443,021,340	1,361,256,964	13,612,569,640	60.7%
December 2015	2,325,766,992	23,257,669,920	605,953,384	6,059,533,840	26.1%
December 2016	2,387,340,411	23,873,404,110	435,990,864	4,359,908,640	18.3%
December 2017	2,504,086,915	25,040,869,150	360,166,544	3,601,665,440	14.4%
December 2018	2,629,767,998	26,297,679,980	318,176,885	3,181,768,850	12.1%
December 2019	2,752,030,608	27,520,306,080	305,435,695	3,054,356,950	11.1%
December 2020	2,831,279,179	28,312,791,790	286,827,750	2,868,277,500	10.1%
December 2021	2,899,677,558	28,996,775,580	277,991,976	2,779,919,760	9.6%
December 2022	3,009,540,842	30,095,408,420	261,175,059	2,611,750,590	8.7%
December 2023	3,077,244,980	30,772,449,800	246,231,674	2,462,316,740	8.0%
December 2024	3,162,143,241	31,621,432,410	211,033,498	2,110,334,980	6.7%
December 2025	3,204,664,144	32,046,641,440	200,964,487	2,009,644,870	6.3%

The latest figures provided by the ECB are the following:

Date	Banknotes	€ Value	Series '1' remainder	€ Value	Proportion
April 2026	3,198,355,367	31,983,553,670	197,775,696	1,977,756,960	6.2%

== Legal information ==
Legally, both the European Central Bank and the central banks of the eurozone countries have the right to issue the 7 different euro banknotes. In practice, only the national central banks of the zone physically issue and withdraw euro banknotes. The European Central Bank does not have a cash office and is not involved in any cash operations.

== Tracking ==
There are several communities of people at European level, most of which is EuroBillTracker, that, as a hobby, it keeps track of the euro banknotes that pass through their hands, to keep track and know where they travel or have travelled. The aim is to record as many notes as possible to know details about its spread, like from where and to where they travel in general, follow it up, like where a ticket has been seen in particular, and generate statistics and rankings, for example, in which countries there are more tickets. EuroBillTracker has registered over 155 million notes as of May 2016, worth more than €2.897 billion.
