= Euro banknotes =

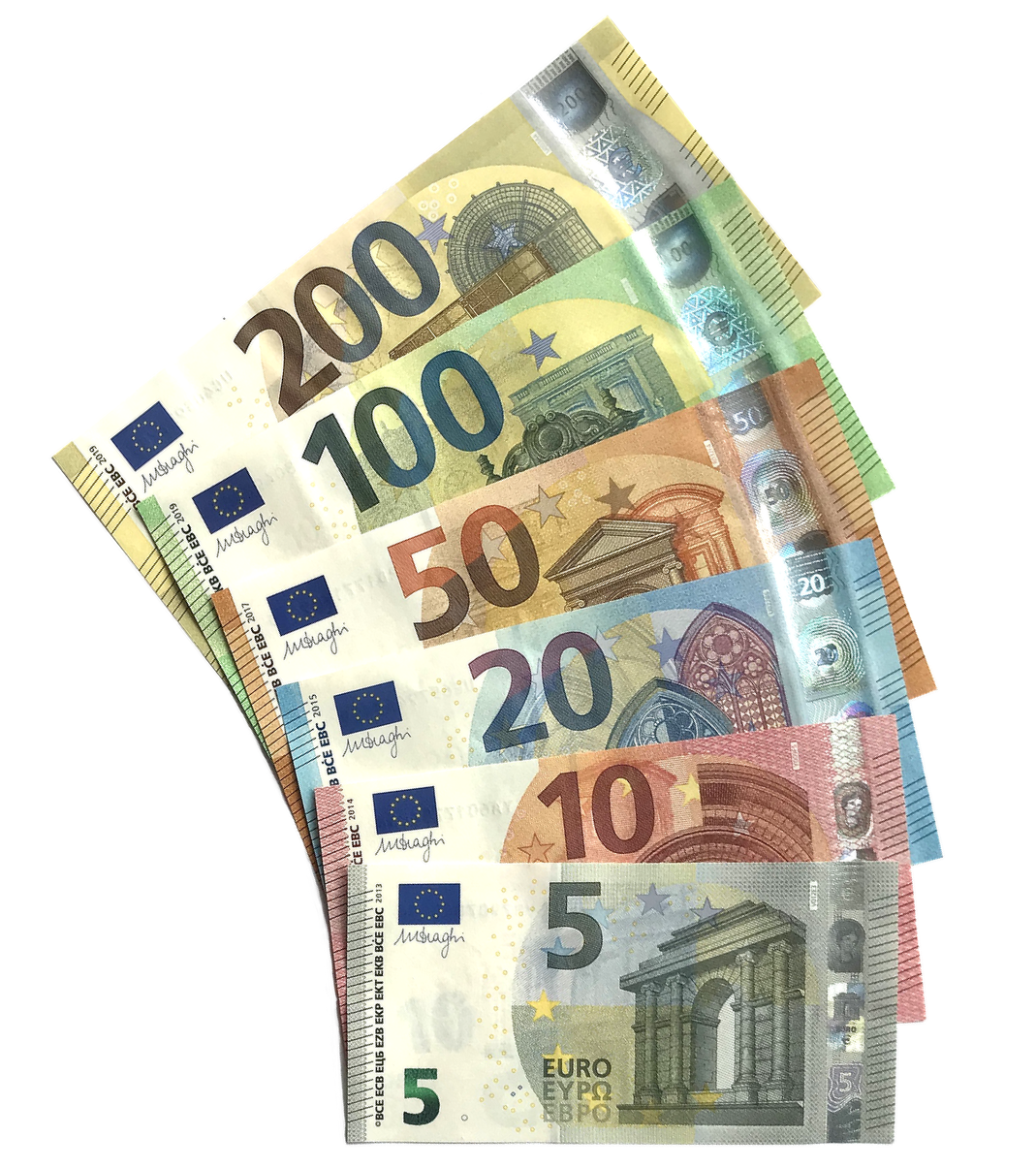
Euro banknotes from the Europa series (since 2013) (Note: The €5 banknotes were put into circulation in 2013, the €10 banknotes in 2014, the €20 banknotes in 2015, the €50 banknotes in 2017 and the €100 and €200 banknotes in 2019.)

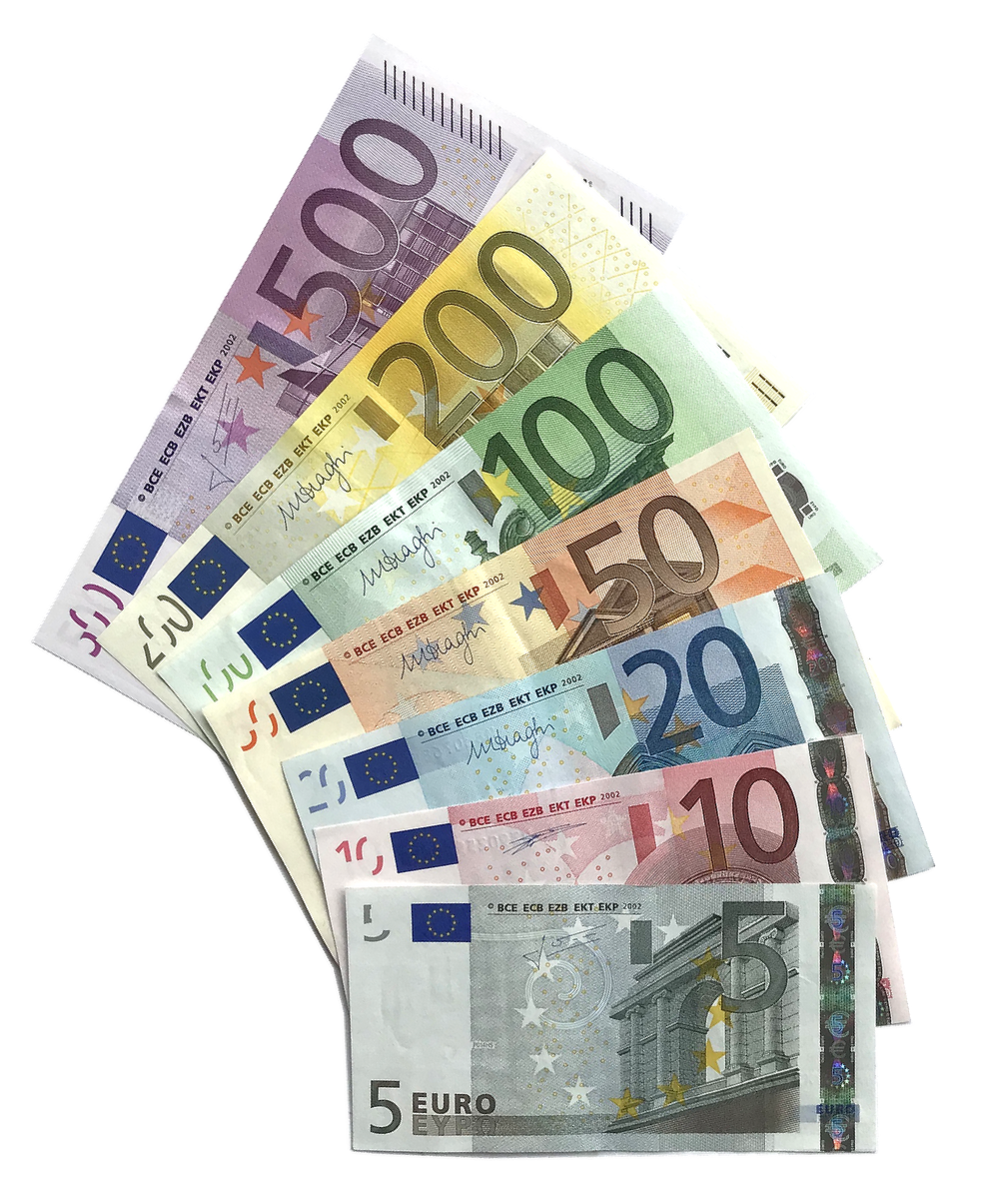
Euro banknotes from the first series (The Ages and Styles of Europe) (2002–2013) (Note: Depending on the denomination, they continued to be printed until 2019.) Both series are legal tender in the eurozone.

The euro banknotes, the common currency of the eurozone, have been in circulation since the first series (also called ES1) was issued in 2002. They are issued by the national central banks of the Eurosystem or the European Central Bank. The euro was established in 1999, but "for the first three years it was an invisible currency, used for accounting purposes only, e.g. in electronic payments". In 2002, notes and coins began to circulate. The euro rapidly took over from the former national currencies and slowly expanded around the European Union.

Denominations of the notes range from €5 to €500 and, unlike euro coins, the design is identical across the whole of the eurozone, although they are issued and printed in various member states. The euro banknotes are pure cotton fibre, which improves their durability as well as giving the banknotes a distinctive feel. They have a variety of color schemes and measure from 120 by 62 millimetres (4.7 in × 2.4 in) to 160 by 82 millimetres (6.3 in × 3.2 in) (first series) and from 120 by 62 millimetres (4.7 in × 2.4 in) to 153 by 77 millimetres (6.0 in × 3.0 in) (second series). The euro notes contain many complex security features such as watermarks, invisible ink characteristics, holograms, optically variable inks and microprinting that document their authenticity. While euro coins have a national side indicating the country of issue (although not necessarily of minting), euro notes lack this. Instead, this information is shown by the first character of each note's serial number.

On 8 November 2012, the ECB announced that the first series of notes would be replaced by the Europa series (also called ES2), starting with the 5 euro note. This series does not have a €500 note, as the ECB have decided to permanently cease its production over concerns that it could facilitate illicit activities.

According to European Central Bank estimates, in September 2026, there were about 31.6 billion banknotes in circulation around the eurozone, with a total value of about €1.631 trillion.

Estimates suggest that the average life of a euro banknote is about three years before replacement due to wear, but with a wide variation by denomination level, from less than a year for €5 banknotes to over 30 years for €500 banknotes, on average. High denomination banknotes (€100, €200, €500) typically last longer as they are less frequently used. The Europa series lower denomination €5 and €10 banknotes are designed to last longer, thanks to additional coating.

== History ==
International adoption of the euro Eurozone members Monetary agreement Unilaterally adopted

The euro came into existence on 1 January 1999. The euro's creation had been a goal of the European Union (EU) and its predecessors since the 1960s. The Maastricht Treaty entered into force in 1993 with the goal of creating economic and monetary union by 1999 for all EU states except the UK and Denmark (though Denmark has a policy of a fixed exchange rate with the euro).

Though the currency was born virtually in 1999, notes and coins did not begin to circulate until 2002. The euro rapidly took over from the former national currencies and slowly expanded around the growing EU. In 2009, the Lisbon Treaty formalised the euro's political authority, the Eurogroup, alongside the European Central Bank.

Slovenia joined the eurozone on 1 January 2007, Cyprus and Malta on 1 January 2008, Slovakia on 1 January 2009, Estonia on 1 January 2011, Latvia on 1 January 2014, Lithuania on 1 January 2015, Croatia on 1 January 2023 and Bulgaria on 1 January 2026.

== Specification ==
There are seven different denominations of euro banknotes: €5, €10, €20, €50, €100, €200, and €500. Each has a distinctive colour and size, and displays examples of a historical European architectural style: windows or gateways on the obverse, and bridges on the reverse. The architectural examples featured are stylised illustrations of the corresponding style, rather than representations of existing structures.

The euro banknotes are made of pure cotton fibre, which improves their durability as well as giving the banknotes a distinctive feel.

=== First series ===
The following table depicts the design characteristics of the 1st series (ES1) of euro notes.

Image		Value	Year	Dimensions (millimetres)	Main colour	Design		printing code position	Issue	Issue suspended	Replacement
Obverse	Reverse	Value	Year	Dimensions (millimetres)	Main colour	Architecture	Century	printing code position	Issue	Issue suspended	Replacement
		€5	2002	120 × 62 mm	Grey	Classical	8th BC–4th AD	Left image edge	1 January 2002	10 January 2013	2 May 2013
		€10	2002	127 × 67 mm	Red	Romanesque	11–12th	8 o'clock star	1 January 2002	13 January 2014	23 September 2014
		€20	2002	133 × 72 mm	Blue	Gothic	13–14th	9 o'clock star	1 January 2002	24 February 2015	25 November 2015
		€50	2002	140 × 77 mm	Orange	Renaissance	15–16th	Right image edge	1 January 2002	5 July 2016	4 April 2017
		€100	2002	147 × 82 mm	Green	Baroque and Rococo	17–18th	Right of 9 o'clock star	1 January 2002	17 September 2018	28 May 2019
		€200	2002	153 × 82 mm	Yellow	Art Nouveau	19th	Above 7 o'clock star	1 January 2002	17 September 2018	28 May 2019
		€500	2002	160 × 82 mm	Purple	Modern architecture (20th century)	20th	9 o'clock star	1 January 2002	26 April 2019	Last of denomination
These images are to scale at 0.7 pixel per millimetre (18 pixel per inch). For table standards, see the banknote specification table.

All the notes of the initial series of euro notes bear the European flag, a map of the continent on the reverse, the name "euro" in both Latin and Greek script (EURO / ΕΥΡΩ) and the signature of a president of the ECB, depending on when the banknote was printed. The 12 stars from the flag are also incorporated into every note.

The notes also carry the acronyms of the name of the European Central Bank in five linguistic variants, covering all official languages of the EU in 2002 (the time of the banknote introduction), and now 19 out of 24 official languages of the EU27, in the following order:

- BCE (French: Banque centrale européenne, Irish: Banc Ceannais Eorpach, Italian: Banca centrale europea, Portuguese: Banco Central Europeu, Spanish: Banco Central Europeo)
- ECB (English: European Central Bank, Danish: Europæiske Centralbank, Dutch: Europese Centrale Bank, Swedish: Europeiska centralbanken)
- EZB (German: Europäische Zentralbank)
- ΕΚΤ (Greek: Ευρωπαϊκή Κεντρική Τράπεζα)
- EKP (Finnish: Euroopan keskuspankki)

The order is determined by the EU country listing order, with BCE ahead of ECB because of the national precedence of Belgium's two main languages, followed by the remaining languages of Germany and Austria (Deutschland, Österreich), Greece (Ελλάδα, Elláda) and Finland (Suomi), in that order.

The initial designs for the banknotes were chosen from 44 proposals in a design competition, launched by the Council of the European Monetary Institute (EMI) on 12 February 1996. The winning entry, created by Robert Kalina from the Oesterreichische Nationalbank, was selected on 3 December 1996.

In the first and Europa series, the Azores, French Guiana, Guadeloupe, Madeira, alba, Réunion, and the Canary Islands, overseas territories of the eurozone member states, which also use the euro, were shown under the map in separate boxes. Cyprus and Malta were not shown on the first series because they were not in the EU in 2002, when the banknotes were issued, even though they joined the eurozone in 2008. The map did not stretch as far east as Cyprus, while Malta was too small to be depicted. Both Cyprus and Malta are however depicted on the Europa series note.

=== Second series ===
The following table depicts the design characteristics of the second series of euro banknotes (ES2), also known as the Europa series, after the holographic depiction of the mythological Europa common to these banknotes.

Image		Value	Year	Dimensions (millimetres)	Main colour	Design		printing code position	Issue
Obverse	Reverse	Value	Year	Dimensions (millimetres)	Main colour	Architecture	Century	printing code position	Issue
		€5	2013	120 × 62 mm	Grey	Classical	8th BC–4th AD	Top right	2 May 2013
		€10	2014	127 × 67 mm	Red	Romanesque	11–12th	Top right	23 September 2014
		€20	2015	133 × 72 mm	Blue	Gothic	13–14th	Top right	25 November 2015
		€50	2017	140 × 77 mm	Orange	Renaissance	15–16th	Top right	4 April 2017
		€100	2019	147 × 77 mm	Green	Baroque & Rococo	17–18th	Top right	28 May 2019
		€200	2019	153 × 77 mm	Yellow	Art Nouveau	19th	Top right	28 May 2019
These images are to scale at 0.7 pixel per millimetre (18 pixel per inch). For table standards, see the banknote specification table.

100 euro note

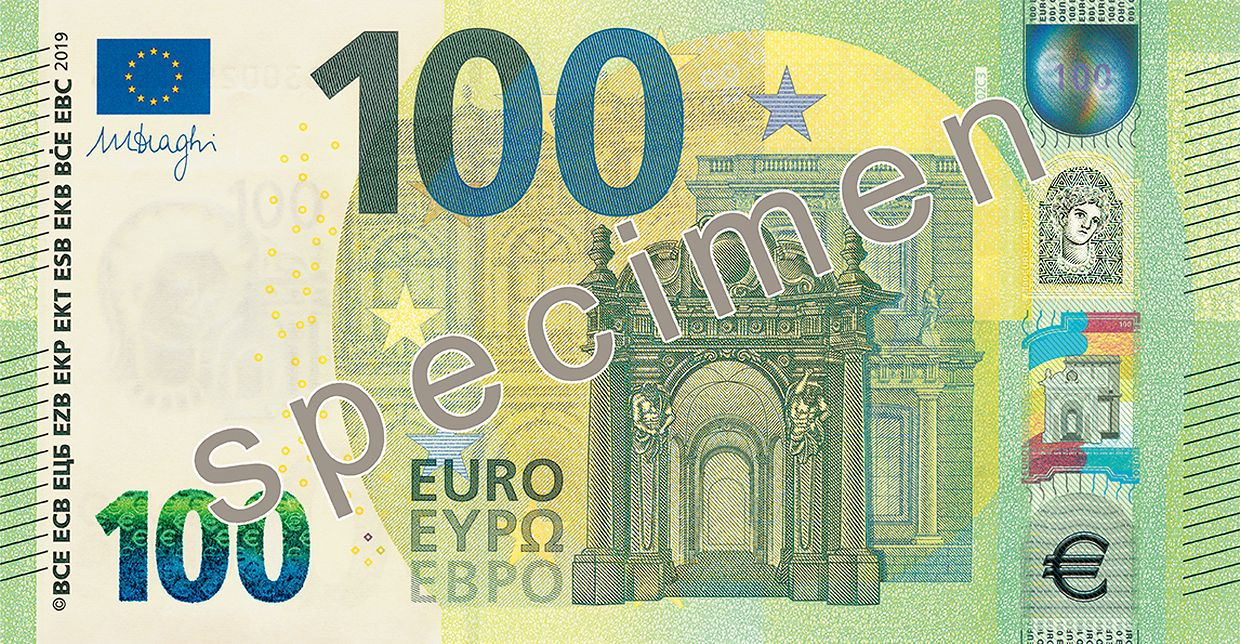
147 x 77 mm (ES2)

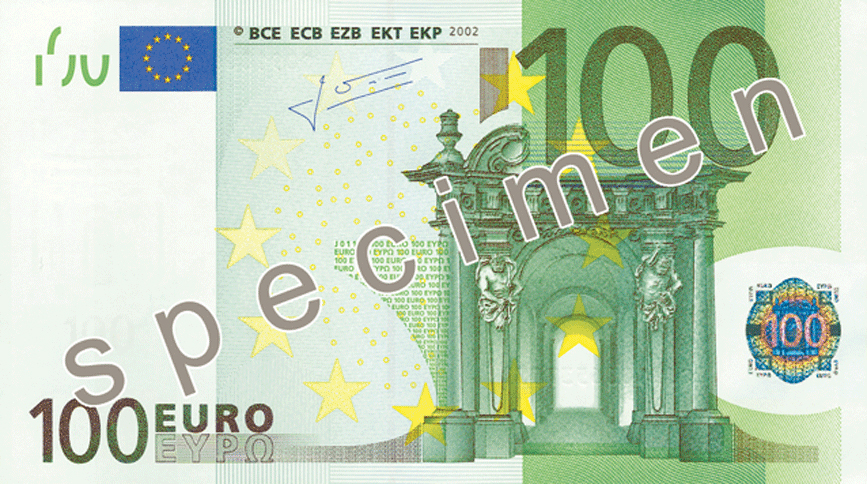
147 x 82 mm (ES1)

200 euro note

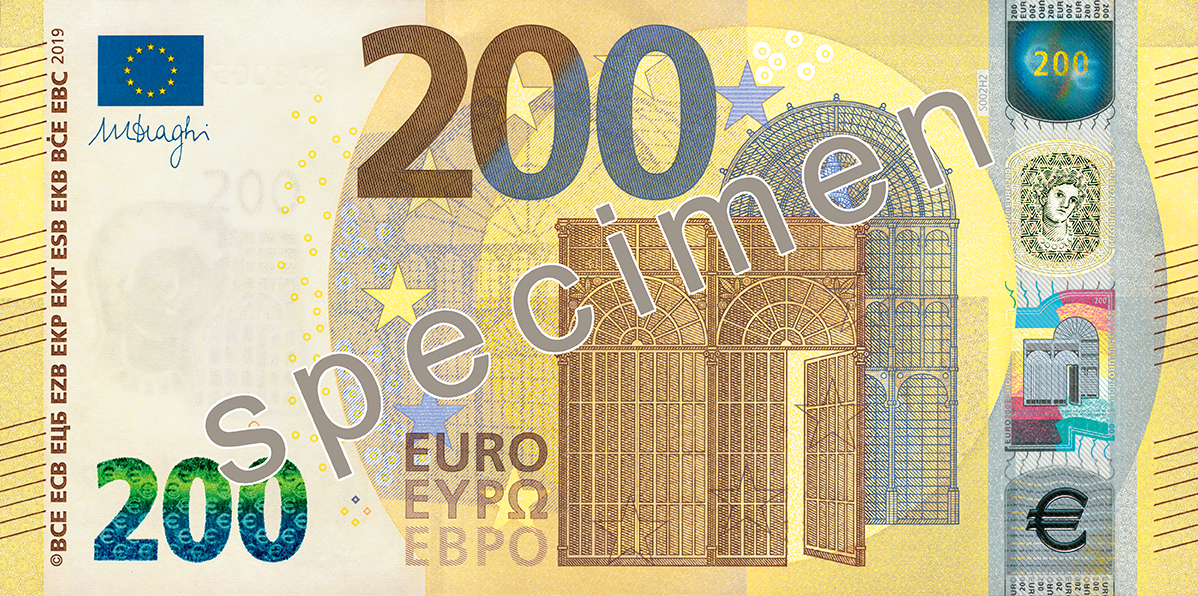
153 x 77 mm (ES2)

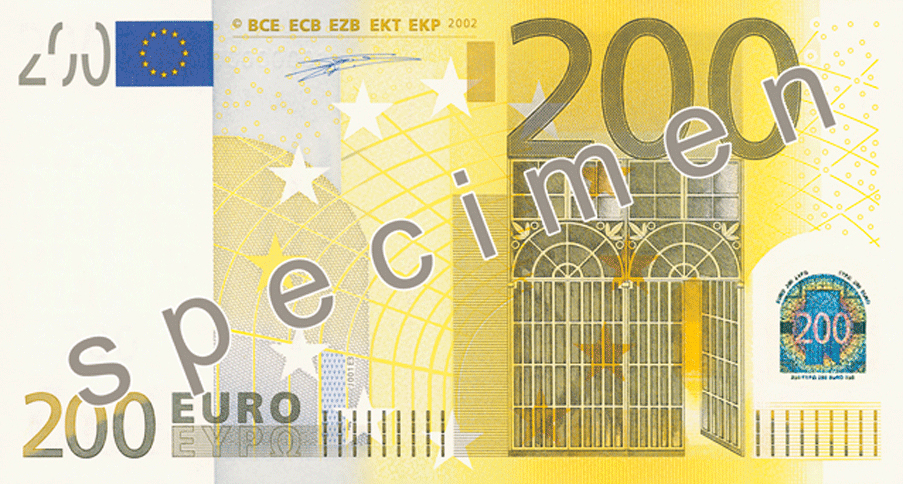
153 x 82 mm (ES1)

The Europa series banknotes, similarly to the first series, bear the European flag, a map of the continent on the reverse and the signature of Mario Draghi, president of the ECB from 1 November 2011 to 31 October 2019. The 12 stars from the flag are also incorporated into the notes. On 4 May 2016 the European Central Bank decided not to issue a 500 euro banknote for the Europa series.

The series also bears the name of the currency in capital letters, but in three scripts: Latin (EURO), Greek (ΕΥΡΩ), and Cyrillic (ЕВРО).

The 2nd series €100 and €200 notes are a different size to the €100 and €200 notes from the 1st series. Both denominations are now the same height (77 mm) as the €50 banknote, which makes them more comfortable to use. Their length remains unchanged.

The design for the 50, 100 and 200 euro notes features the acronyms of the name of the European Central Bank in ten linguistic variants, covering all official languages of the European Union, in the following order:

- BCE (French: Banque centrale européenne, Irish: Banc Ceannais Eorpach, Italian: Banca centrale europea, Portuguese: Banco Central Europeu, Romanian: Banca Centrală Europeană, Spanish: Banco Central Europeo)
- ECB (English: European Central Bank, Czech: Evropská centrální banka, Danish: Europæiske Centralbank, Dutch: Europese Centrale Bank, Latvian: Eiropas Centrālā banka, Lithuanian: Europos Centrinis Bankas, Slovak: Európska centrálna banka, Slovene: Evropska centralna banka, Swedish: Europeiska centralbanken)
- ЕЦБ (Bulgarian: Европейска централна банка)
- EZB (German: Europäische Zentralbank)
- EKP (Estonian: Euroopa Keskpank, Finnish: Euroopan keskuspankki)
- ΕΚΤ (Greek: Ευρωπαϊκή Κεντρική Τράπεζα)
- ESB (Croatian: Europska središnja banka)
- EKB (Hungarian: Európai Központi Bank)
- BĊE (Maltese: Bank Ċentrali Ewropew)
- EBC (Polish: Europejski Bank Centralny)

The 5 euro, 10 euro and 20 euro notes do not feature ESB, as Croatian became an official language only in July 2013 with the accession of Croatia, after the introduction of the banknote design earlier that year. The order in which the acronyms are shown is determined by the same principles as for Series 1: the language of Bulgaria (България/Bulgaria) precedes that of Germany (Deutschland); EKP now precedes ΕΚΤ due to the accession of Estonia (Eesti); and the languages of Croatia (Hrvatska), Hungary (Magyarország), Malta and Poland (Polska) trail the list.

The notes of the Europa series do not show the same year. The year shown is the year the note is issued.

Reinhold Gerstetter, an independent banknote designer (and one of participants of the 1996 design contest), was chosen by the European Central Bank to redesign the euro notes.

The Europa series euro banknotes are supposedly more durable than the first series banknotes.

== Design ==
=== Bridges ===
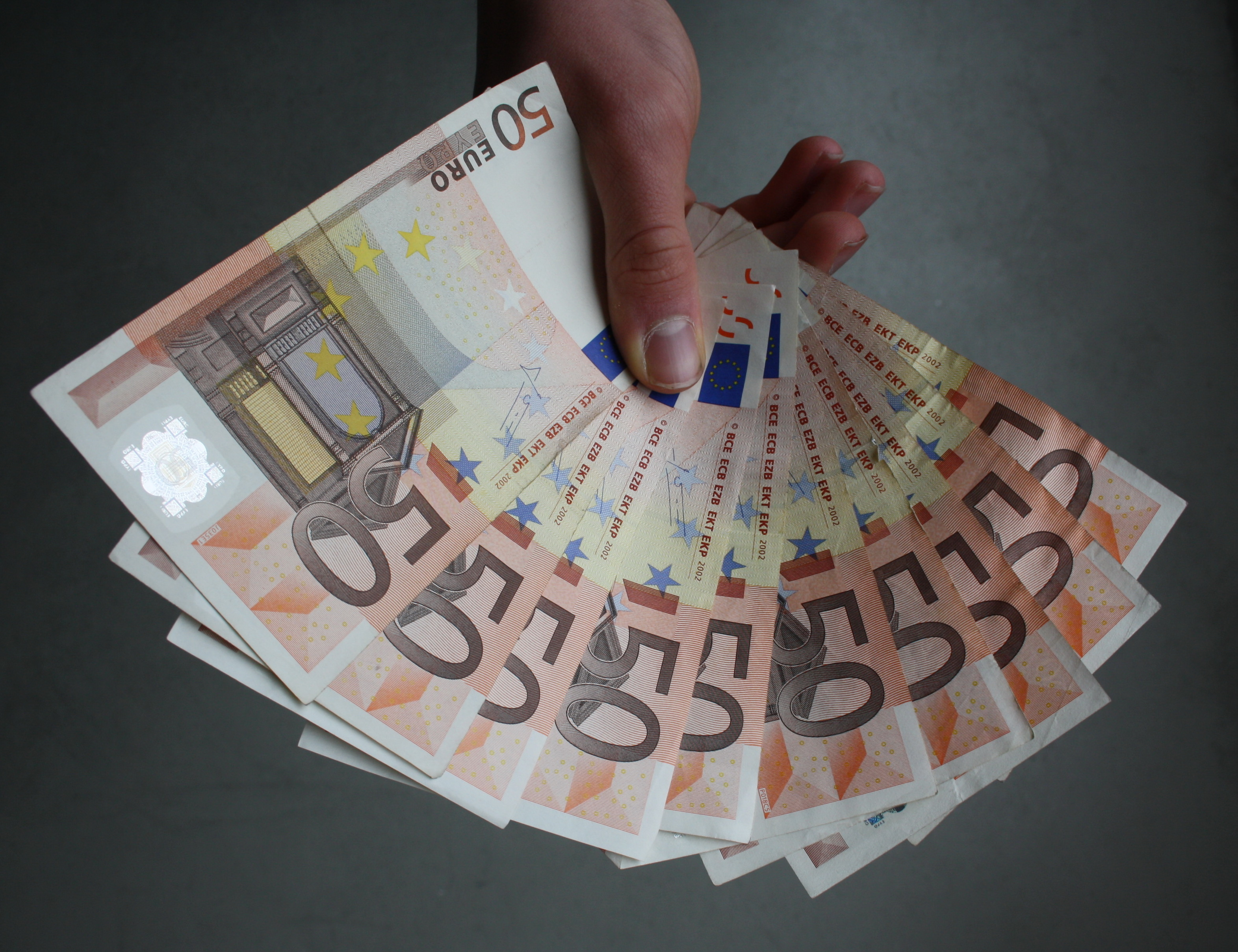
The 50 euro banknote has an orange colour scheme, and its gateway and bridge are from the Renaissance.

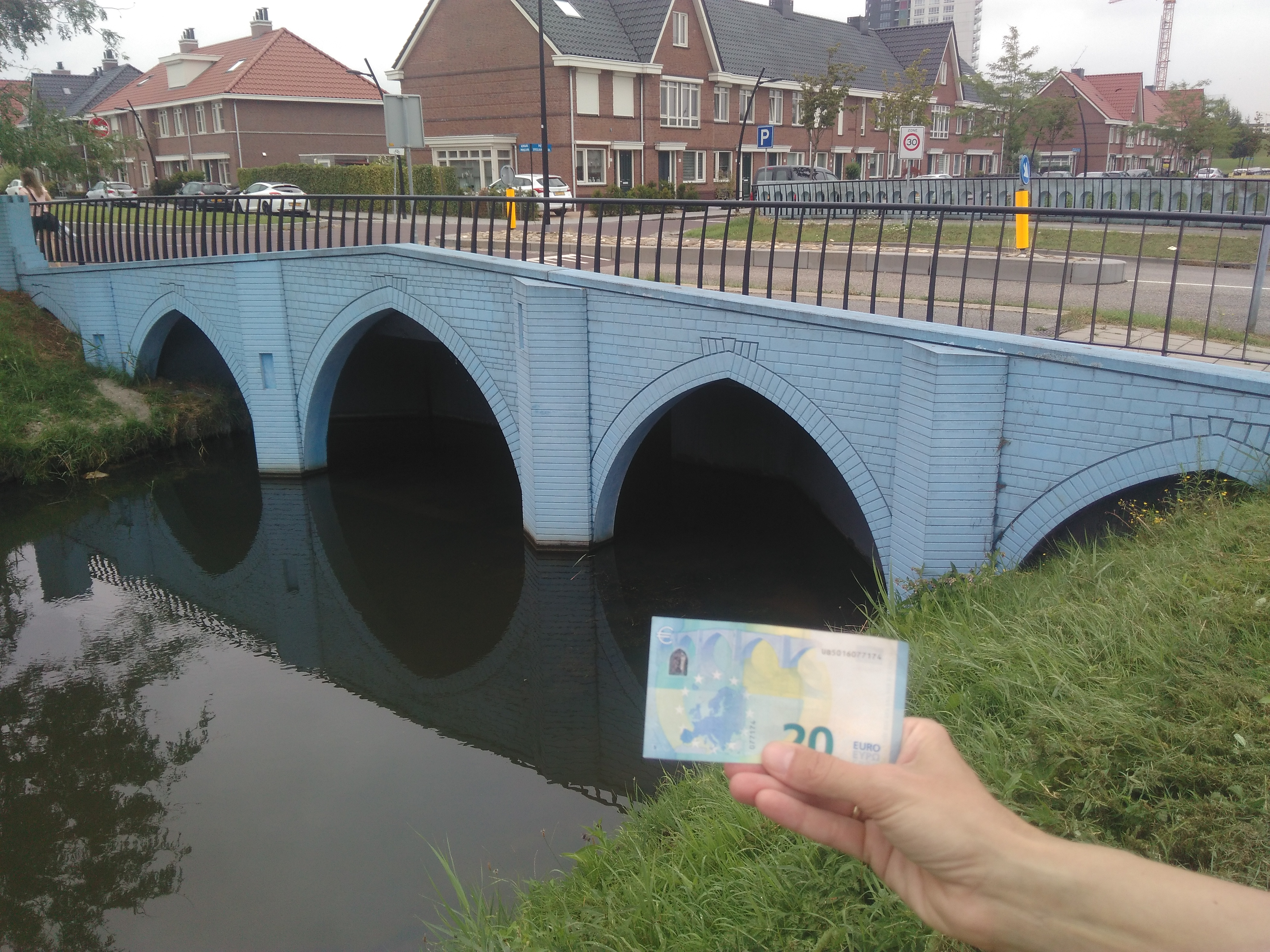
The bridge depicted on the 20 euro banknote built in Spijkenisse

Due to the great number of historic bridges, arches, and gateways throughout the European continent, all the structures represented on the notes are entirely stylized illustrations of the relevant architectural styles, designed to evoke the landmarks within the European Union, representing various European ages and styles. For example, the 5 euro note has a generic rendition of Classical architecture, the 10 euro note of Romanesque architecture, the 20 euro note of Gothic architecture, the 50 euro note of the Renaissance, the 100 euro note of Baroque and Rococo, the 200 euro note of Art Nouveau and the 500 euro note of modern architecture. The initial designs by Robert Kalina were of actual bridges, including the Rialto Bridge in Venice and the Pont de Neuilly in Paris, and were subsequently rendered more generic. In 2011, Dutch artist Robin Stam and the town of Spijkenisse in the Netherlands built seven bridges of colored concrete after the designs on the seven euro banknotes.

=== Signature ===
Banknotes printed from 2004 to 2012 show the signature of the second president of the ECB, Jean-Claude Trichet.

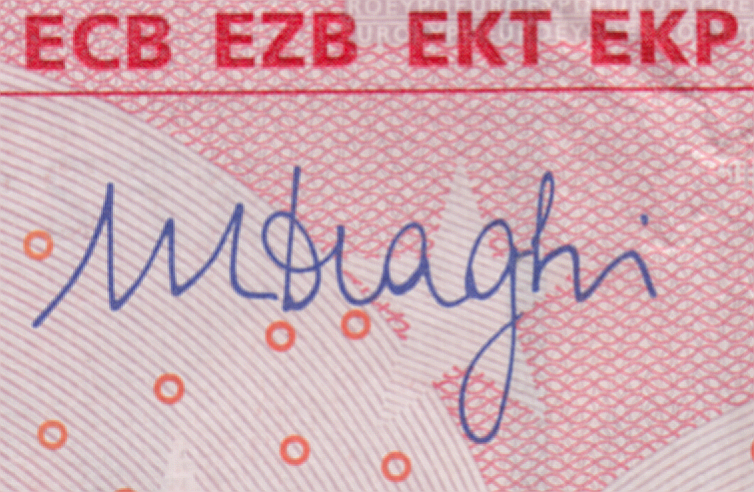
Mario Draghi's signature on a 10-euro banknote (ES1)

The euro banknotes bear the signature of the President of the European Central Bank.

Wim Duisenberg was the first ECB president when the first euro banknotes and coins were issued until 2003. Notes printed between November 2003 and March 2012 show the signature of Jean-Claude Trichet, the second President of the ECB. Banknotes printed after March 2012 bear the signature of the third ECB President Mario Draghi.

From 2020, Christine Lagarde's signature would gradually begin to appear on banknotes entering circulation, becoming the fourth signature to appear on euro banknotes.

As a curiosity, the five euro banknotes of the first series did not bear the signature of Mario Draghi, despite the fact that his mandate began on 1 November 2011 and the design of the five euro banknotes of the second series is from January 2013.

=== Security features ===
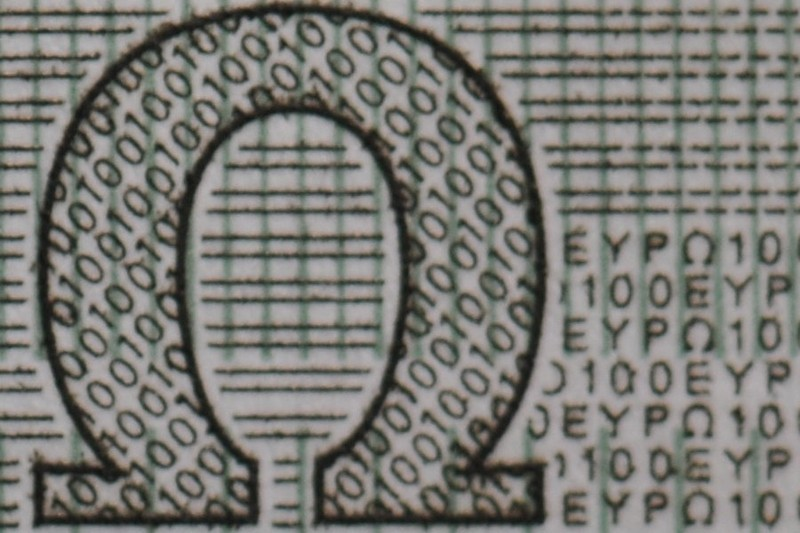
Microprinting on a 100 euro note (ES1)

The European Central Bank has described some of the basic security features of the euro notes that allow the general public to recognise the authenticity of their currency at a glance:

- For the first series: the firm and crisp paper, the raised print, the watermark, the security thread, the see-through number, the hologram, the micro-perforations, the glossy stripe for €20 and below, the color-changing number for €50 and above, UV light, infrared and the microprint.
- For the Europa series: the firm and crisp paper, the raised print, the portrait watermark, the security thread, the emerald number, the portrait hologram, UV and UV-C, infrared and the microprint.

However, in the interest of advanced security of the euro notes, the full list of these features is a closely guarded secret of the European Central Bank and the National Central Banks of the Eurosystem.

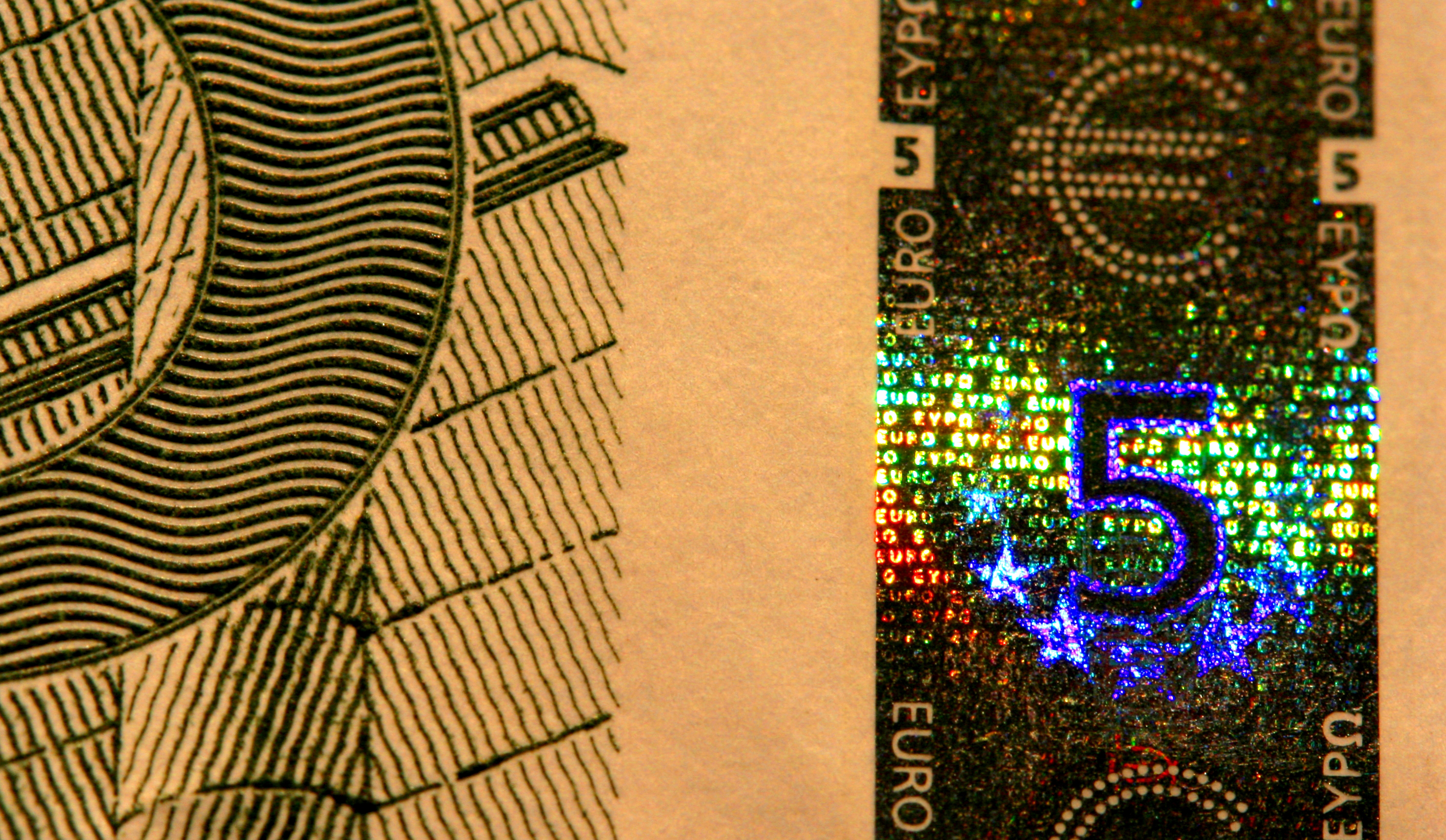
€5 (ES1) holographic band

Still, between the official descriptions and independent discoveries made by observant users, it is thought that the euro notes have at least eleven different security features, which are:

- Holograms – The lower value notes carry a holographic band to the right of the obverse. This band contains the denomination, the euro sign, the stars of the EU flag and perforations in the shape of the euro sign. In the Europa series €5 banknote, there is Europa, a gate, 'EURO' and the euro sign, the number 5 and perforations in the shape of a euro sign. The higher-value notes include a holographic decal containing the denomination, the obverse illustration, microprinting, and perforations in the shape of the euro sign.
- Variable colour ink – This appears on the lower right-hand side corner of the reverse of the higher-value notes. When observed from different angles, the colour will change from purple to olive green or brown. This special ink is also on the left bottom on the Europa series notes.
- Checksum – Each note has a unique serial number. The remainder from dividing the serial number by 9 gives checksum corresponding to the initial letter indicated on the note. Using a variation of the divisibility rule shortcut, the remainder from division by 9 can easily be found by adding the constituent digits and, if the sum still does not make the remainder obvious, adding the digits of the sum. Alternatively, substituting the letter with its ASCII value makes the resulting number exactly divisible by 9. Taking the same example, Z10708476264, the ASCII code for Z is 90, so the resulting number is 9010708476264. Dividing by 9 yields a remainder of 0. Using the divisibility rule again, the result can be checked speedily since the addition of all digits gives 54; 5 + 4 = 9—so the number is divisible by 9, or 9010708476264 modulo 9 is 0.

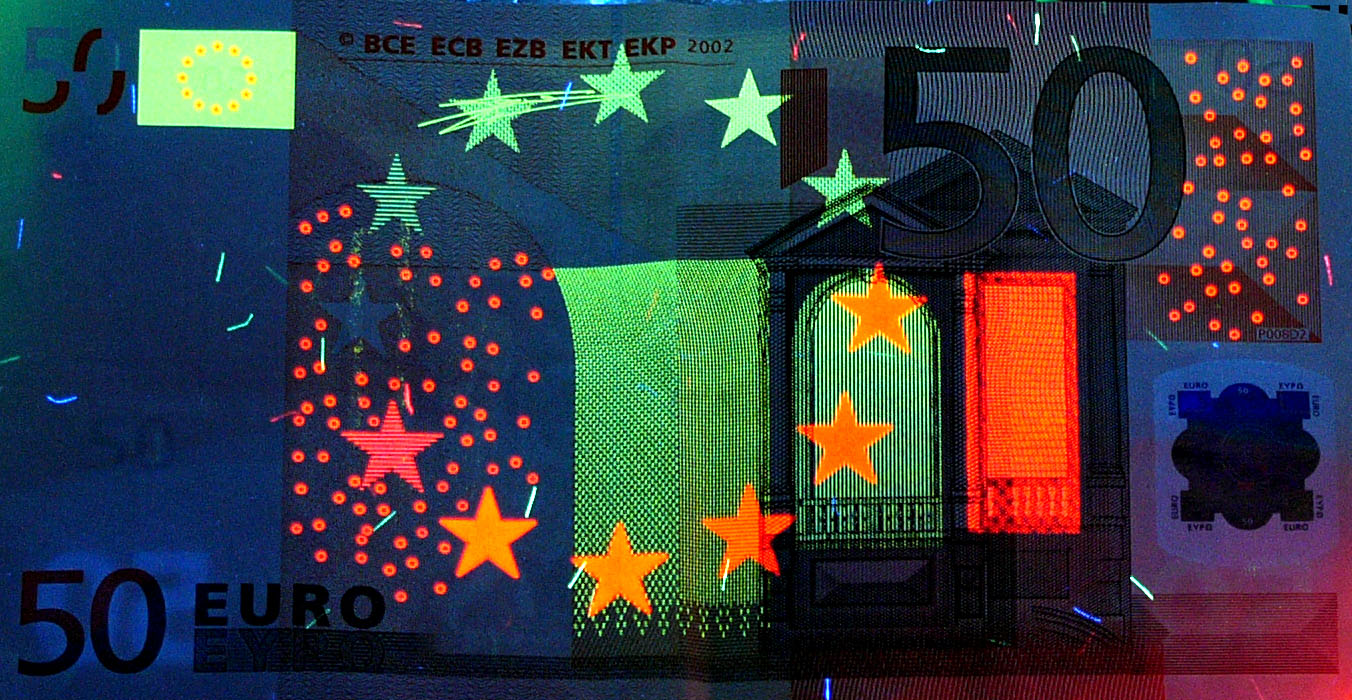
A 50 euro note (ES1) under ultraviolet light

- EURion constellation – Euro banknotes contain a pattern known as the EURion constellation that can be used to detect their identity as banknotes to prevent copying and counterfeiting. Some photocopiers are programmed to reject images containing this pattern.
- Watermarks – There are possibly two watermarks on the euro notes. They are:
  - Standard watermark – Each denomination is printed on uniquely watermarked paper. This may be observed by holding the note up to the light. The thinner parts will show up brighter with backlight illumination and darker with a dark background. In the first series, the standard watermark is a gate/window that is depicted on the note and the denomination, for the €5 of the Europa series, it is the face of Europa and the denomination as well.
  - Digital watermark – Like the EURion constellation, a Digimarc digital watermark is embedded in the banknotes' designs. Recent versions of image editors, such as Adobe Photoshop or Paint Shop Pro refuse to process banknotes. This system is called Counterfeit Deterrence System (CDS) and was developed by the Central Bank Counterfeit Deterrence Group.
- Infrared and fluorescent printing patterns – When seen in the near infrared, the banknotes will show darker areas in different zones depending on the denomination. Ultraviolet light will make the EURion constellation show in sharper contrast, and also some fluorescent fibres stand out.

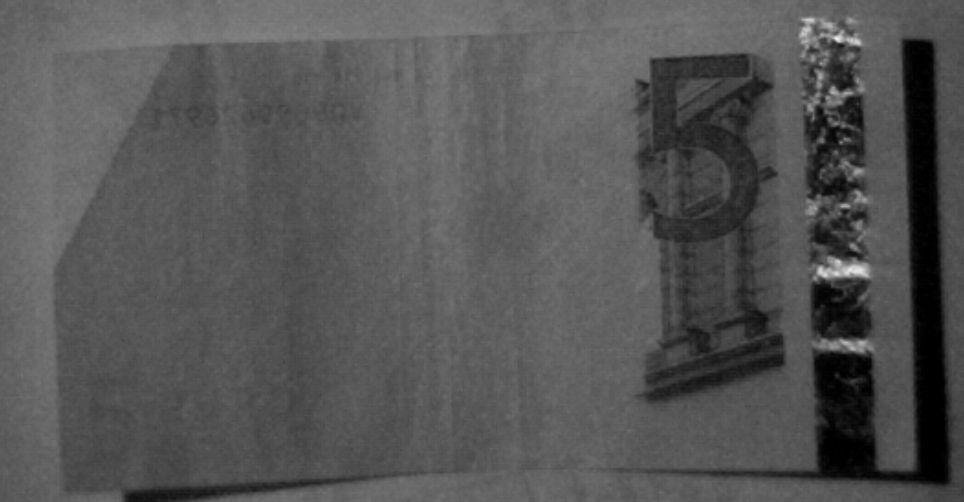
A 5 euro note (ES1) under infrared light

- Security thread – A black magnetic thread in the centre of the note is only seen when held up to the light. It features the denomination of the note, along with the word "euro" in the Latin alphabet and the Greek alphabet.
- Magnetic ink – Some areas of the euro notes feature magnetic ink. For example, the rightmost church window on the €20 note is magnetic, as well as the large zero above it.

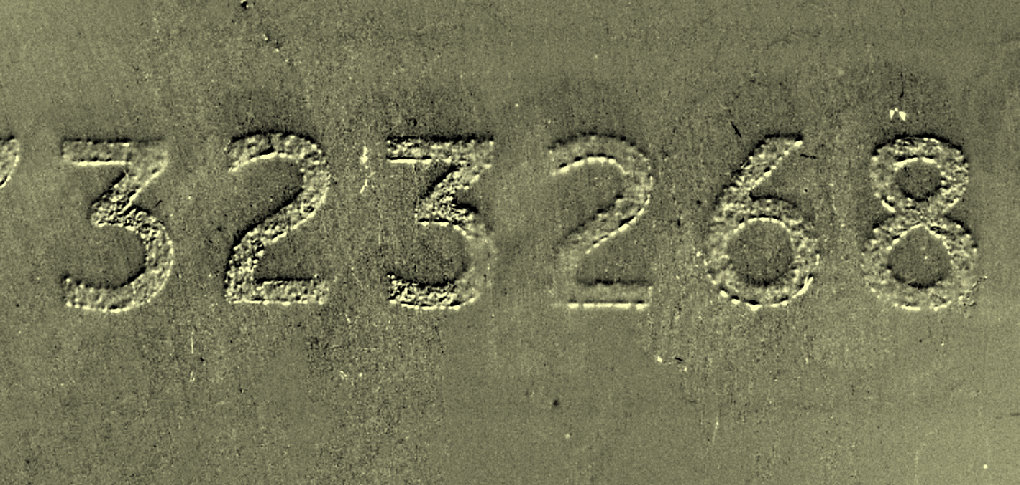
Magnetic serial number on euro banknote (recorded using CMOS-MagView)

- Microprinting – The texture lines to the bottom, like those aligned to the right of ΕΥΡΩ mark on the €5 note, consist of the sequence "EURO ΕΥΡΩ" in microprinting.
- Matted surface – The euro sign and the denomination are printed on a vertical band that is only visible when illuminated at an angle of 45°. This only exists for the lower-value notes.
- Raised print – On every banknote, the initials of the ECB are in raised print. In the first series, every banknote has a bar with raised print lines. On the €200 note of the first series, there are lines at the bottom which are raised to allow blind people to identify the note. On the €500 note of the first series, these lines are on the right-hand side. On the Europa series, there are lines on both sides of the banknote.
- Bar code – When held up to the light, dark bars can be seen to the right of the watermark. The number and width of these bars indicates the denomination of the note. When scanned, these bars are converted to Manchester code.

Manchester code
Note	Barcode	Manchester
€5	0110 10	100
€10	0101 10	110
€20	1010 1010	0000
€50	0110 1010	1000
€100	0101 1010	1100
€200	0101 0110	1110
€500	0101 0101	1111

(looked at from the reverse, a dark bar is 1, a bright bar 0)

=== Features for people with impaired sight ===
"A good design for the blind and partially sighted is a good design for everybody" was the principle behind the cooperation of the European Central Bank and the European Blind Union during the design phase of the first series banknotes in the 1990s. As a result, the design of the first euro banknotes include several characteristics which help both the blind and partially sighted to use the notes with greater confidence.

Features for blind and visually impaired users include:

- Different banknote sizes – the bigger the value, the larger the note.
- Clearly contrasting, striking banknote colours. The €5 note is grey, the €10 note red, the €20 note blue, the €50 note orange, the €100 note green, the €200 note yellow-brown and the €500 note is purple.
- Large numerals for the denomination.
- Raised print.
- Tactile marks on the €200 and €500 of the first series and on all the notes of the Europa series.

As in the design process of the first series of euro notes, visually impaired users were consulted during the design phase of the Europa series, and their feedback included in the final designs.

=== Europa series ===
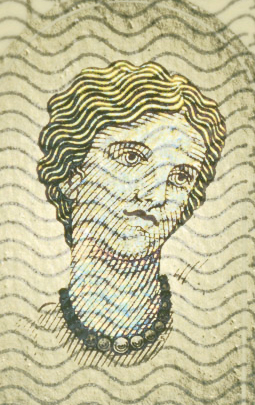
The portrait of Europa is also among the security features, but the theme of the banknotes is still the same.

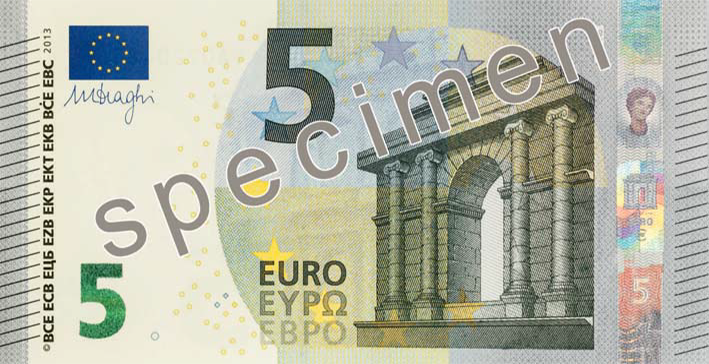
5 euro note from the new Europa series written in Latin (EURO) and Greek (ΕΥΡΩ) alphabets, but also in the Cyrillic (ЕВРО) alphabet, as a result of Bulgaria joining the European Union in 2007

The European Central Bank intends to redesign the notes every seven or eight years. A new series, called the "Europa series", was released from 2013; the first notes entered circulation on 2 May 2013. The new series includes slight changes, notably the inclusion of the face of the mythological princess Europa in the watermark and in the hologram stripe.

New production and anti-counterfeiting techniques are employed on the new notes, but the design shares the colours of the first series and the theme of bridges and arches. The new notes are nonetheless recognisable as a new series.

The new notes also reflect the expansion of the European Union: every member of the EU is depicted on it. The initial series did not include the recent members Cyprus and Malta (Cyprus was off the map to the east and Malta was too small to be depicted.)

The Bulgarian Cyrillic alphabet features on the Europa series banknotes, as a result of Bulgaria joining the European Union in 2007. Thus this series includes "ЕВРО", which is the Bulgarian spelling for EURO, as well as the abbreviation "ЕЦБ" (short for Европейска централна банка in Bulgarian), with Bulgaria having joined the eurozone and abandoning the Bulgarian lev on 1 January 2026. The new banknotes also feature the Maltese abbreviation BĊE (Bank Ċentrali Ewropew), the Hungarian abbreviation EKB (Európai Központi Bank) and the Polish abbreviation EBC (Europejski Bank Centralny). The modified 5 euro note features the initials of the European Central Bank in each of the contemporary EU member languages in a column on the left-hand side of the obverse. The word "euro" in Latin, Greek, and Cyrillic lettering has also been moved to a more central position.

The full design of the Europa series 5 euro banknote was revealed on 10 January 2013. The new note entered circulation on 2 May 2013. The full design of the Europa series 10 euro note was revealed on 13 January 2014 and it entered circulation on 23 September 2014. The full design of the Europa series 20 euro banknote was revealed on 24 February 2015, and it was launched on 25 November 2015. The full design of the Europa series 50 euro note was revealed on 5 July 2016 and the new 50 note was released on 4 April 2017. The full design of the Europa series 100 euro banknote and 200 euro banknote was revealed on 17 September 2018 and the new notes entered circulation on 28 May 2019 therefore "will complete the issuance of the Europa series."

On 4 May 2016, the European Central Bank announced that a Europa series 500 euro banknote would not be released, due to fears of facilitating criminal activity. "The ECB has decided to stop producing the €500 banknote, although the first series €500 remains legal tender."

The old series will gradually be withdrawn. The ECB will announce "well in advance" when the old notes will lose their legal tender status. However, they will not lose their value and it will be possible to exchange them for new notes at Eurosystem central banks indefinitely.

==== Security features ====
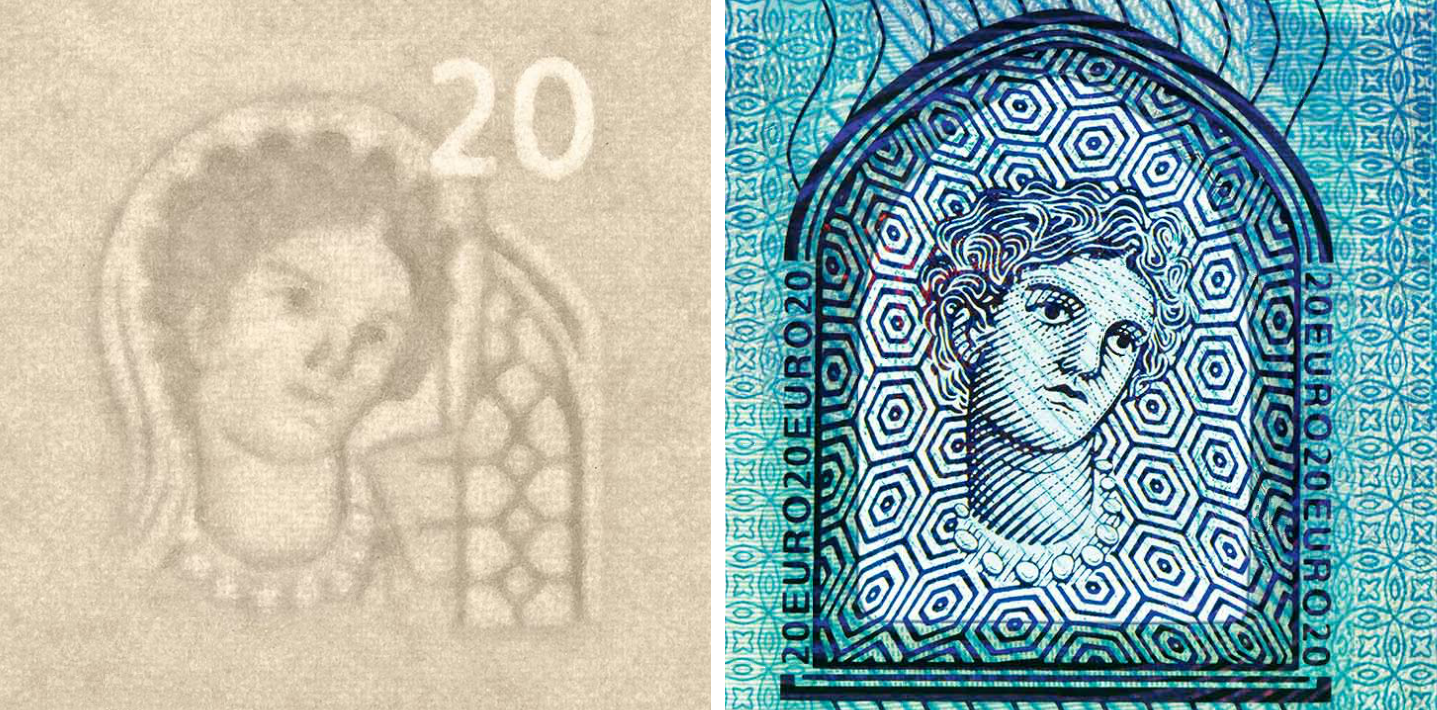
Face of Europa on the new 20 euro banknote (ES2)

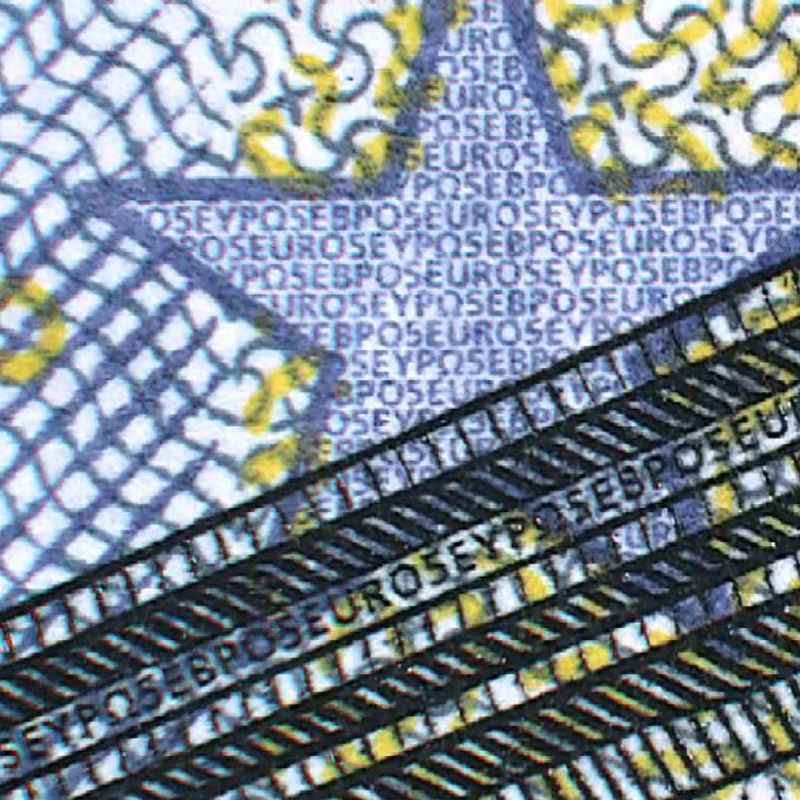
Microprinting on the Europa series 5 euro note

5 euro banknote under infrared light (Europa series)

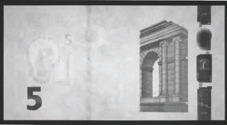
Obverse

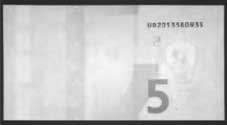
Reverse

- Watermark: When the note is held under a normal light source, a portrait of Europa and an electrotype denomination appear on either side.
- Portrait hologram: When the note is tilted, the silver-coloured holographic stripe reveals the portrait of Europa – the same one as in the watermark. The stripe also reveals a window and the value of the banknote.
- Colour changing ink: When the note is tilted, the number on the note displays an effect of light that moves up and down. The number also changes colour from emerald green to deep blue.
- Raised printing: On the front of the note, there is a series of short raised lines on the left and right edges. The main edge, the lettering and the large value numeral also feel thicker.
- Security thread: When the note is held against the light, the security thread appears as a dark line. The euro symbol (€) and the value of the banknote can be seen in tiny white lettering in the thread.
- Microprinting: Tiny letters which can be read with a magnifying glass. The letters should be sharp, not blurred.
- Ultraviolet ink: Some parts of the banknote shine when under UV or UV-C light. These are the stars in the flag, the small circles, the large stars and several other areas on the front. On the back, a quarter of a circle in the centre as well as several other areas glow green. The horizontal serial number and a stripe appear in red.
- Infrared light: Under infrared light, the emerald number, the right side of the main image and the silvery stripe are visible on the obverse of the banknote, while on the reverse, only the denomination and the horizontal serial number are visible.
- Glossy stripe: On the back side, over the map of Europe. Depending on the viewing angle, the glossy stripe appears golden or is nearly invisible.

=== New series and plans for a redesign ===
On 6 December 2021, the ECB announced its intention to redesign the banknotes. ECB President Christine Lagarde stated in a press release that it was time to "review the look of [the] banknotes and make them more relatable to the public".

A 19-member advisory board, with one member from each eurozone member state, was appointed and tasked with proposing a shortlist of themes for the new banknotes. On 30 November 2023, the ECB announced that the new theme for future banknotes had been narrowed down to either "European culture" or "rivers and birds". On 31 January 2025, the ECB's Governing Council selected motifs for the two possible themes.

Selected banknote motifs for the theme of "European culture: shared cultural spaces"
Value	Concept	Obverse	Reverse
€5	Performing arts	Maria Callas	Buskers
€10	Music	Ludwig van Beethoven	Choir performing at a song festival
€20	Universities and schools	Marie Curie Skłodowska	Teacher and students in a classroom
€50	Libraries	Miguel de Cervantes	Library with patrons reading physical and digital books
€100	Museums and exhibitions	Leonardo da Vinci	People admiring street art and contemporary art
€200	Public squares	Bertha von Suttner	People in a public square with trees

Selected banknote motifs for the theme of "Rivers and birds: resilience in diversity"
Value	Obverse	Reverse
€5	Wallcreeper with mountain spring	European Parliament
€10	Kingfisher by a waterfall	European Commission
€20	Bee-eater colony along a river in a valley	European Central Bank
€50	White stork flying over a meandering river	Court of Justice of the European Union
€100	Avocet over a mudflat at a river mouth	European Council and Council of the European Union
€200	Northern gannet over the ocean	European Court of Auditors

The ECB's choice to use the working form "Marie Curie (born Skłodowska)" in their communication led to criticism from some Polish commentators, who argued that the decision to include Curie's Polish maiden name only between parentheses represented a lack of recognition for Poland's contributions to European history. In response, a spokesperson for the ECB called the form used a "draft" and stated that the institution would take the name dispute into account, consulting "various historical and linguistic sources"; during her life, Curie variously used "Skłodowska-Curie" and "M. Curie" when signing papers. She has previously appeared on French and Polish currency, respectively on the 500 franc banknote and 50-euro cent coin (as Marie Curie) and on the 20 000 złoty banknote (as Maria Skłodowska-Curie).

The ECB launched a public contest for the redesign on 15 July 2025, opening applications to EU-based graphic designers. Over 1,200 designers applied, of which 25 were selected and invited to create design proposals. An independent jury of 21 experts then shortlisted ten design proposals, which were made public on 23 July 2026. A public survey was opened that day, running until 21 September, after which the Governing Council is due to make a final decision by the end of 2026.

A clear timeline of the new banknotes' introduction was not specified; the ECB stated they would enter circulation "in subsequent years". ECB President Christine Lagarde has previously stated they would "see the light of day" by 2028.

== Circulation ==
The European Central Bank closely monitors the circulation and stock of euro coins and banknotes. It is a task of the Eurosystem to ensure an efficient and smooth supply of euro notes and to maintain their integrity throughout the eurozone.

=== Statistics ===
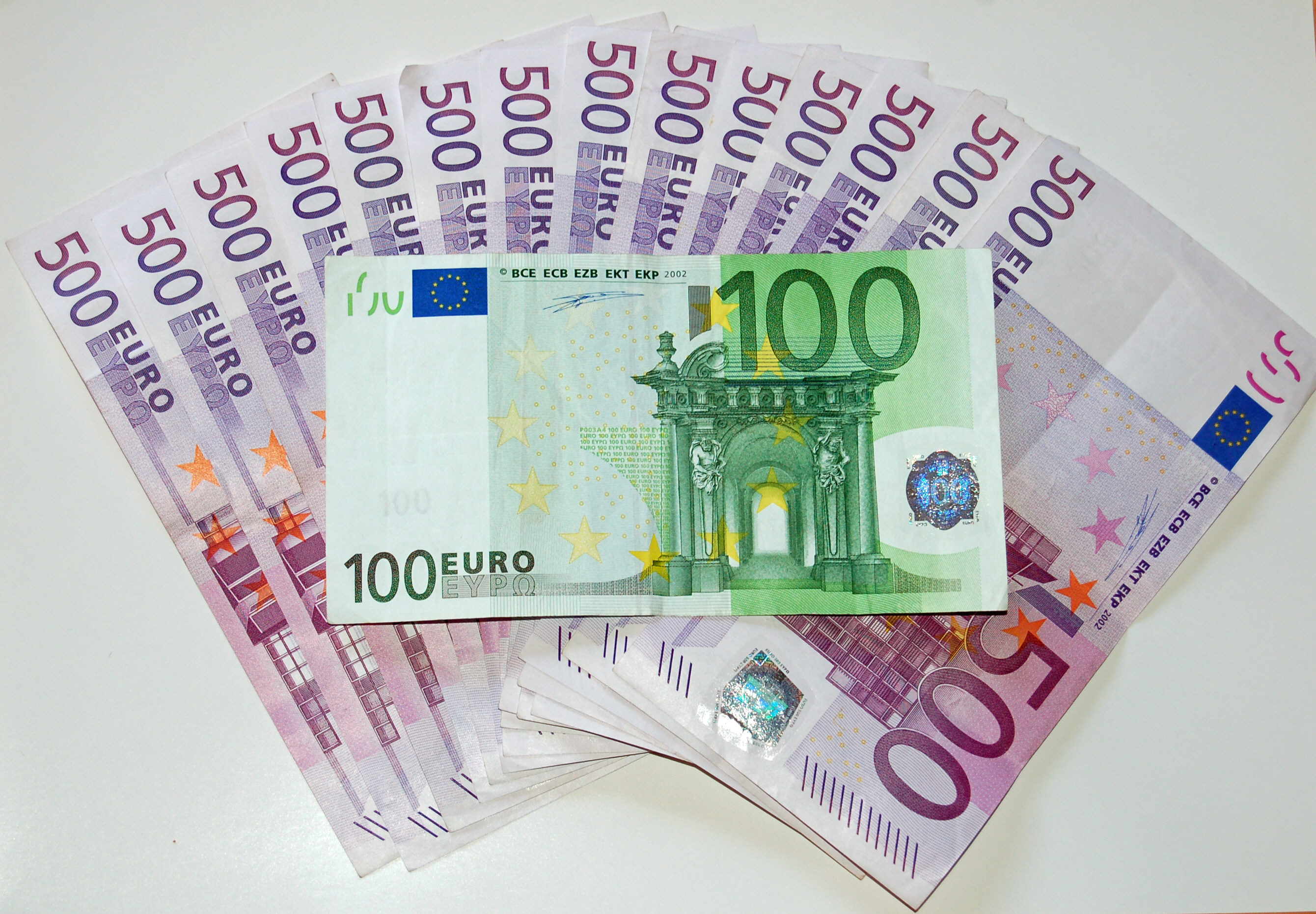
Every month, the European Central Bank publishes the number of banknotes in circulation around the eurozone.

As of September 2026, there were about 31.6 billion banknotes in circulation around the eurozone, with a total value of about €1.631 trillion.

Breakdown of banknotes in circulation in April 2025
Note	Quantity	Value (€)	Share of total (%)	
Note	Quantity	Value (€)	Quantity	Value
€5	2,244,172,329	11,220,861,645	7.4	0.7
€10	3,067,171,673	30,671,716,730	10.2	1.9
€20	4,794,514,991	95,890,299,820	15.9	6.1
€50	14,904,867,170	745,243,358,500	49.4	47.2
€100	4,104,365,734	410,436,573,400	13.6	26.0
€200	857,634,995	171,526,999,000	2.8	10.9
€500	226,864,870	113,432,435,000	0.8	7.2
Total	30,199,591,762	1,578,422,244,095	100	100

Figures since 2012

Date	Banknotes (millions)	Value (€ billions)
December 2012	15,687	912.6
December 2013	16,512	956.2
December 2014	17,528	1,016.5
December 2015	18,895	1,083.4
December 2016	20,220	1,126.2
December 2017	21,407	1,170.7
December 2018	22,615	1,231.1
December 2019	24,057	1,292.7
December 2020	26,494	1,434.5
December 2021	28,188	1,544.4
December 2022	29,450	1,572.0

=== Counterfeiting ===
The European Central Bank publishes information on the amount of counterfeit banknotes removed from circulation every 6 months. In 2009, the ECB reported the highest-ever amount of counterfeits with 860,000 removed items, a rate of 64 per million banknotes in circulation. According to an investigation of the University of Lausanne, the ratio of counterfeited banknotes was about 10 in one million real banknotes for the Swiss franc, of 100 in one million for United States dollar and of 300 in one million for pound sterling.

In 2011, 606,000 euro counterfeits were removed from circulation (41 per million). In 2012, it was lower at 531,000 euro counterfeits (34 per million). In 2014, the ECB removed 838,000 counterfeit euro banknotes from circulation (48 per million). Since then, these values have continuously decreased, mainly due to the improved security features of the Europa series.

In 2021, 347,000 euro counterfeits were seized, equivalent to a rate of 12 counterfeits per million banknotes in circulation. The majority of counterfeit items were €50 (33.8%) and €20 (32.1%) banknotes.

In 2024, the amount of counterfeit banknotes was still on a relative low, after a sharp decrease due to the COVID-19 pandemic. The central bank states that "Most counterfeits are easy to detect as they have no, or only very poor, imitations of security features." This, together with the gradual decline after 2013 suggests that the improved security features on the Europa edition make it increasingly difficult to create a convincing fake.

== Legal information ==
Legally, both the European Central Bank and the national central banks (NCBs) of the eurozone countries have the right to issue the seven different euro banknotes. In practice, only the NCBs of the zone physically issue and withdraw euro notes. The European Central Bank does not have a cash office and is not involved in any cash operations. However, the European Central Bank is responsible for overseeing the activities of national central banks in order to harmonise cash services in the eurozone.

== Issuance and printing ==
The ECB has the exclusive right to authorise the issue of notes within the eurozone, but most notes are actually issued by the National Central Banks (NCBs) of the eurozone. As of 2004, 8% of banknotes issues were allocated to the European Central Bank and 92% were allocated to eurozone NCBs (in practice, the ECB issues no notes and the NCBs' issues may deviate from the statutory allocation). The issuing central bank can be seen on the banknote serial number. Each NCB is now responsible for the production of certain denominations, as assigned by the ECB.

=== 1st series ===
Since 2002, euro notes have been printed by the National Central Banks of the Eurosystem, with each Central Bank being responsible for and bearing the cost of producing a proportion of the notes. The production of notes needs to be sufficient to meet expected and unexpected surges in demand and to replace unfit notes. Production volumes are forecast jointly by the National Central Banks and the European Central Bank, and it needs to be approved by the Governing Council of the ECB.

==== Printing works ====
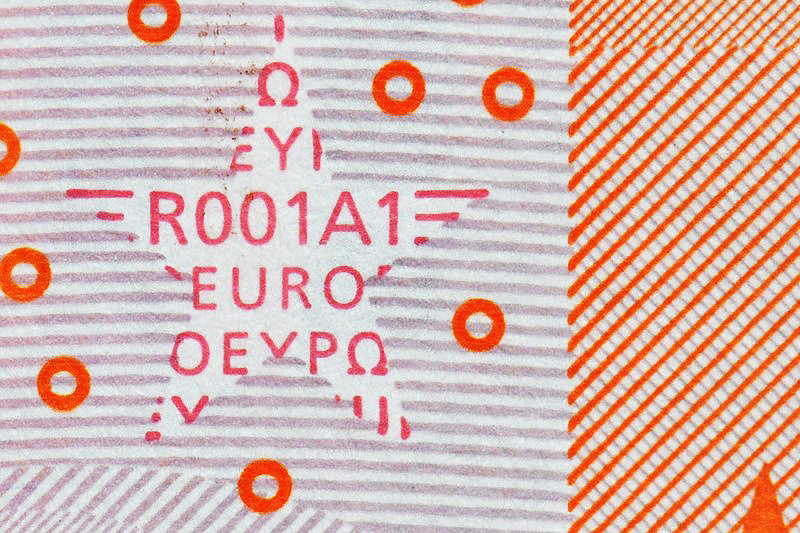
The printing code on a 10 euro note from the first banknote series

There is a six-character printing code on every euro banknote which gives the printer of the note. These printing codes have an initial letter, followed by three digits, then by a single letter, and ending in a digit, for example, "R001A1".

The initial letter identifies the printing facility (the facilities are described below): "R" for example would be Bundesdruckerei, a printer in Berlin, Germany. The three digits state sequential printing plates: "001", for example, would be the first printing plate created by the printer. The fifth and sixth characters, a letter followed by a number, represent the row and column, respectively, of the particular banknote on the particular plate: "A" would be the first row and "1" the first column.

Banknotes are printed in sheets. Different printers use different sheet sizes and sheets of higher denominations, which are larger in size, would have fewer notes printed per sheet. For example, two German printers print €5 banknotes in sheets of 60 (10 rows, designated "A" to "J" and six columns), the sheets of €10 notes have 54 banknotes (nine rows, six columns), and €20 banknotes are printed in sheets of 45 banknotes (nine rows, five columns).

The printing code does not need to be the same as the country code, i.e. notes issued by a particular country may have been printed in another country. The printers used to print euro banknotes include commercial printers as well as national printers, some of which have been privatised, some previously produced national notes before the adoption of the euro. There is one former or current national printer in each of the countries which issue euro notes, with the exception of Germany, where the former East German and West German printers now produce euro notes. France also has two printers, F. C. Oberthur (a private printer) and the printing works of the Bank of France, and two more in the United Kingdom: Thomas De La Rue (another private printer) and the Bank of England printing house, although the latter does not produce euro banknotes.

Printer identification codes
Code	Printer	Location	Country	NCB(s) produced for
(A)	(Bank of England Printing Works)	(Loughton)	(United Kingdom)	—
(B)	Unassigned			
(C)	(Tumba Bruk)	(Tumba)	(Sweden)	—
D	Setec Oy	Vantaa	Finland	L ( Finland)
E	F. C. Oberthur	Chantepie	France	E ( Slovakia), F ( Malta), G ( Cyprus), H ( Slovenia), L ( Finland), P ( Netherlands), U ( France), X ( Germany)
F	Österreichische Banknoten‐ und Sicherheitsdruck GmbH	Vienna	Austria	N ( Austria), P ( Netherlands), S ( Italy), T ( (Republic of Ireland) Ireland), Y ( Greece)
G	Koninklijke Joh. Enschedé	Haarlem	Netherlands	E ( Slovakia), F ( Malta), G ( Cyprus), H ( Slovenia), L ( Finland), N ( Austria), P ( Netherlands), V ( Spain), X ( Germany), Y ( Greece)
H	De La Rue	Gateshead	United Kingdom	L ( Finland), M ( Portugal), P ( Netherlands), T ( (Republic of Ireland) Ireland)
(I)	Unassigned			
J	Banca d'Italia	Rome	Italy	S ( Italy)
K	Banc Ceannais na hÉireann / Central Bank of Ireland	Dublin	Ireland	T ( (Republic of Ireland) Ireland)
L	Banque de France	Chamalières	France	U ( France)
M	Fábrica Nacional de Moneda y Timbre	Madrid	Spain	V ( Spain)
N	Bank of Greece	Athens	Greece	Y ( Greece)
(O)	Unassigned			
P	Giesecke & Devrient	Munich & Leipzig	Germany	L ( Finland), M ( Portugal), P ( Netherlands), U ( France), V ( Spain), X ( Germany), Y ( Greece)
(Q)	Unassigned			
R	Bundesdruckerei	Berlin	Germany	D ( Estonia), E ( Slovakia), F ( Malta), G ( Cyprus), H ( Slovenia), L ( Finland), P ( Netherlands), X ( Germany), Y ( Greece)
(S)	(Danmarks Nationalbank)	(Copenhagen)	(Denmark)	—
T	National Bank of Belgium	Brussels	Belgium	U ( France), V ( Spain), Z ( Belgium)
U	Valora—Banco de Portugal	Carregado	Portugal	M ( Portugal)
(V)	Unassigned			
(W)	Unassigned			
(X)	Unassigned			
(Y)	Unassigned			
(Z)	Unassigned			

- The A, C and S codes have been reserved for the British, Swedish and Danish printers not printing euro banknotes.
- Where a printer is listed as producing banknotes for a particular country, this may apply to a single denomination, or as many as all seven denominations. Some NCBs source different denominations from different printers, and some source even a single denomination from multiple printers. NCBs that issue banknotes are free to source from any authorized printers, and do so in varying quantities.

==== Serial number ====
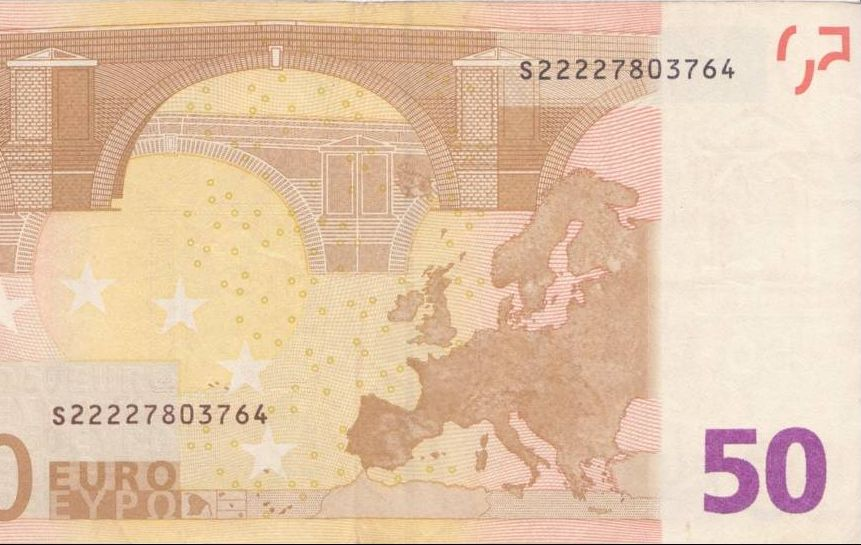
The serial number on a 50 euro note. This banknote was issued for Banca d'Italia, the Italian central bank.

Unlike euro coins, euro notes do not have a national side indicating which country issued them. The country that issued them is not necessarily where they were printed. The information about the issuing country is encoded within the first character of each note's serial number instead.

The first character of the serial number is a letter which uniquely identifies the country that issues the note. The remaining 11 characters are numbers which, when their digital root is calculated, give a checksum also particular to that country.

The W, K and J codes have been reserved for the three EU member states that did not adopt the euro in 1999, while the R prefix is reserved for Luxembourg, which, at present, does not issue euro banknotes. The first series of uncirculated notes from Luxembourg use the prefix belonging to the country where they were printed.

National identification codes
Code	Country		Checksum^{(1)}
Code	in English	in official language(s)	Checksum^{(1)}
A	Unassigned		
B	Lithuania	Lietuva	
C	Latvia	Latvija	
D	Estonia	Eesti	4
E	Slovakia	Slovensko	3
F	Malta	Malta	2
G	Cyprus	Κύπρος [Kypros]/Kıbrıs	1
H	Slovenia	Slovenija	9
I	Unassigned		
J^{(2)}	United Kingdom	United Kingdom	7
K^{(2)}	Sweden	Sverige	6
L	Finland	Suomi/Finland	5
M	Portugal	Portugal	4
N	Austria	Österreich	3
O	Unassigned		
P	Netherlands	Nederland	1
Q	Unassigned		
R	Luxembourg	Lëtzebuerg/Luxembourg/Luxemburg	8
S	Italy	Italia	7
T	Ireland	Ireland	6
U	France	France	5
V	Spain	España	4
W^{(2)}	Denmark	Danmark	3
X	Germany	Deutschland	2
Y	Greece	Ελλάδα [Ellada]	1
Z	Belgium	België/Belgique/Belgien	9

^{(1)} checksum of the 11 digits without the letter
^{(2)} Denmark, the United Kingdom and Sweden presently do not use the Euro, but had these serial number prefixes reserved for the first series of notes.

Although the Slovenian letter had been reserved since the eurozone enlargement in January 2007, the country initially used previously issued banknotes issued from other member states. The first banknotes bearing the "H" letter, produced in France specifically on behalf of Slovenia, were witnessed no sooner than April 2008. The 'Cypriot banknotes' (G) appeared in circulation in November 2009, whereas, those from Malta (F) appeared 3 months later (February 2010). Slovak notes (E) first appeared in October 2010.

=== 2nd series ===
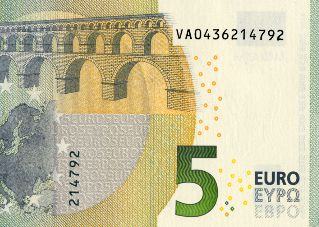
The serial number on a 5 euro note. This banknote was printed at the Royal Mint of Spain.

In the new series, there are two codes, like in the first series. They are the printing code in the top right hand corner and the serial number. Part of the serial number is horizontal and part of it is vertical. The serial number begins with a letter indicating the printer, which is broadly similar to the first series (Z for Belgium, Y for Greece, etc.). The second letter of the new serial numbers is part of the serial number itself, and has no further significance.

However, as the code indicates the printer, rather than the issuing national central bank, certain letters have been reassigned from NCBs which do not maintain their own printing facilities. In the first series, H denoted Slovenia. As there is no Slovene printer of euro banknotes, H represents De La Rue (Loughton) in the second series. Several of the printers which replaced what were NCB codes maintain their printing code from the first series (De La Rue, mentioned, and Bundesdruckerei, which replaced Luxembourg as R, its previous printing code).

Identification codes
Code	Printer	Country
A	Unassigned	
B	Unassigned	
C	Unassigned	
D	Polska Wytwórnia Papierów Wartościowych	Poland
E	Oberthur	France
F	Oberthur Fiduciaire AD Bulgaria	Bulgaria
G	Unassigned	
H	De La Rue (Loughton)	United Kingdom
I	Omitted	
J	De La Rue (Gateshead)	United Kingdom
K	Unassigned	
L	Unassigned	
M	Valora	Portugal
N	Oesterreichische Banknoten‐ und Sicherheitsdruck GmbH	Austria
O	Omitted	
P	Joh. Enschedé	Netherlands
Q	Omitted	
R	Bundesdruckerei	Germany
S	Banca d'Italia	Italy
T	Central Bank of Ireland	Ireland
U	Banque de France	France
V	IMBISA (owned by Bank of Spain)	Spain
W	Giesecke+Devrient (Leipzig)	Germany
X	Giesecke+Devrient (Munich)	Germany
Y	Bank of Greece	Greece
Z	National Bank of Belgium	Belgium

=== Production statistics ===
The European Central Bank publishes details about euro notes produced every year.

Banknotes to be produced in 2027 (projected)
Denomination	Quantity (millions)	Value (€ millions)	NCBs commissioning production
€5	500.9	2,504.5	Belgium, Greece, Austria, Portugal
€10	488.2	4,881.5	Estonia, Ireland, Cyprus, Luxembourg, Malta, Netherlands, Slovenia, Slovakia, Finland
€20	563.5	11,269.6	Bulgaria, Germany, Croatia, Italy, Latvia, Lithuania
€50	1,089.8	54,492.0	Spain, France, Italy
€100	469.3	46,929.0	Germany
€200	—		
€500	—		
Total	3,111.7	120,076.6	

Banknotes to be produced in 2026 (projected)
Denomination	Quantity (millions)	Value (€ millions)	NCBs commissioning production
€5	500.1	2,500.6	Belgium, Greece, France, Austria, Portugal
€10	575.8	5,757.7	Germany, Spain
€20	297.5	5,949.0	France, Italy
€50	326.6	16,332.0	Estonia, Ireland, Italy, Cyprus, Luxembourg, Malta, Netherlands, Slovenia, Slovakia, Finland
€100	254.9	25,489.0	Germany, Croatia, Latvia, Lithuania
€200	—		
€500	—		
Total	1,954.9	56,028.3	

Banknotes produced in 2025
Denomination	Quantity (millions)	Value (€ millions)	NCBs commissioning production
€5	495.0	2,475.2	Greece, Spain
€10	1016.4	10,164.1	Belgium, Germany, Croatia, Latvia, Lithuania, Austria, Portugal
€20	1,267.1	25,341.2	Germany, Estonia, Ireland, France, Italy, Cyprus, Luxembourg, Malta, Netherlands, Slovenia, Slovakia, Finland
€50	643.0	32,149.0	Spain, France, Italy
€100	—		
€200	—		
€500	—		
Total	3,421.5	70,129.5	

Banknotes produced in 2024
Denomination	Quantity (millions)	Value (€ millions)	NCBs commissioning production
€5	313.8	1,568.9	Greece, Spain
€10	424.2	4,241.5	Spain
€20	564.9	11,297.6	Belgium, Germany, Croatia, Latvia, Lithuania, Austria, Portugal
€50	1,538.4	76,920.0	Estonia, Ireland, France, Italy, Cyprus, Luxembourg, Malta, Netherlands, Slovenia, Slovakia, Finland
€100	527.5	52,751.0	Germany
€200	164.2	32,846.0	Germany
€500	—		
Total	3,533.0	179,625.0	

Banknotes produced in 2023
Denomination	Quantity (millions)	Value (€ millions)	NCBs commissioning production
€5	131.7	658.5	Greece
€10	—		
€20	985.0	19,700.0	Belgium, Germany, Italy, Latvia, Lithuania, Austria, Portugal
€50	1,645.0	82,250.0	Estonia, Ireland, Spain, France, Italy, Cyprus, Luxembourg, Malta, Netherlands, Slovenia, Slovakia, Finland
€100	220.0	22,000.0	Germany
€200	160.0	32,000.0	Germany
€500	—		
Total	3,141.7	156,608.5	

Banknotes produced in 2022
Denomination	Quantity (millions)	Value (€ millions)	NCBs commissioning production
€5	316.0	1,580.0	France
€10	918.0	9,180.0	Belgium, Germany, Greece, Austria
€20	1,215.0	24,300.0	Belgium, France, Italy, Portugal
€50	2,767.0	138,350.0	Germany, Estonia, Ireland, Spain, France, Italy, Cyprus, Latvia, Lithuania, Luxembourg, Malta, Netherlands, Slovenia, Slovakia, Finland
€100	420.0	42,000.0	Germany
€200	452.0	90,400.0	Germany
€500	—		
Total	6,088.0	305,810.0	

Banknotes produced in 2021
Denomination	Quantity (millions)	Value (€ millions)	NCBs commissioning production
€5	973.8	4,869.1	Belgium, Spain, Austria, Portugal
€10	1,176.1	11,761.2	Germany, Greece
€20	1,403.6	28,071.2	Germany, Estonia, Ireland, France, Italy, Cyprus, Luxembourg, Malta, Netherlands, Slovenia, Slovakia, Finland
€50	1,951.4	97,572.0	Germany, Spain, France, Italy, Latvia, Lithuania
€100	—		
€200	335.0	67,000.0	Germany, Austria
€500	—		
Total	5,839.9	209,273.5	

Banknotes produced in 2020
Denomination	Quantity (millions)	Value (€ millions)	NCBs commissioning production
€5	751.6	3,757.8	Belgium, Ireland, Austria, Portugal
€10	1,185.8	11,858.1	Germany, Spain
€20	1,271.0	25,419.8	Estonia, France, Cyprus, Luxembourg, Malta, Netherlands, Slovenia, Slovakia, Finland
€50	1,751.9	87,596.5	Greece, Spain, France, Italy, Austria
€100	763.8	76,380	Germany, Latvia, Lithuania
€200	—		
€500	—		
Total	5,724.1	205,012.2	

Banknotes produced in 2019
Denomination	Quantity (millions)	Value (€ millions)	NCBs commissioning production
€5	613.3	3,066	Belgium, Spain, Austria, Portugal
€10	424.6	4,245	Germany
€20	970.9	19,417	Estonia, Ireland, France, Cyprus, Luxembourg, Malta, Netherlands, Slovenia, Slovakia, Finland
€50	1729.2	86,457	Germany, Greece, Spain, France, Italy, Latvia, Lithuania
€100	—		
€200	—		
€500	—		
Total	3,738	113,187.50	Belgium, Spain, France, Italy, Austria, Germany, Greece, Ireland, Portugal, Cyprus, Estonia, Malta, Latvia, Lithuania, Luxembourg, Netherlands, Slovenia, Slovakia, Finland

Banknotes produced in 2018
Denomination	Quantity (millions)	Value (€ millions)	NCBs commissioning production
€5	448.4	2,241	Estonia, Greece, Cyprus, Luxembourg, Malta, Netherlands, Slovenia, Slovakia, Finland
€10	—		
€20	526.5	10,530	Belgium, Ireland, Spain, Portugal
€50	—		
€100	2,300	230,000	Germany, Spain, France, Italy, Latvia, Lithuania, Austria
€200	715	143,000	France, Italy, Austria
€500	—		
Total	3,989.90	385,771.90	Belgium, Spain, France, Italy, Austria, Germany, Greece, Ireland, Portugal, Cyprus, Estonia, Malta, Latvia, Lithuania, Luxembourg, Netherlands, Slovenia, Slovakia, Finland

Banknotes produced in 2017
Denomination	Quantity (millions)	Value (€ millions)	NCBs commissioning production
€5	390	1,948	Ireland, Greece
€10	—		
€20	900	18,000	France, Italy, Portugal
€50	3,300	164,998	Belgium, Germany, Estonia, Spain, France, Italy, Cyprus, Latvia, Lithuania, Luxembourg, Malta, the Netherlands, Slovenia, Slovakia, Finland
€100	850	85,002	Germany, Spain, Austria
€200	284	56,752	Belgium, Germany
€500	—		
Total	5,723	326,700	Belgium, Spain, France, Italy, Austria, Germany, Greece, Ireland, Portugal, Cyprus, Estonia, Malta, Latvia, Lithuania, Luxembourg, Netherlands, Slovenia, Slovakia, Finland

Banknotes produced in 2016
Denomination	Quantity (millions)	Value (€ millions)	NCBs commissioning production
€5	—		
€10	1,000	10,000	Ireland, Greece, Spain, France
€20	500	10,000	France
€50	4,541	227,050	Belgium, Germany, Estonia, Spain, France, Italy, Cyprus, Latvia, Lithuania, Luxembourg, Malta, the Netherlands, Portugal, Slovenia, Slovakia, Finland
€100	176	17,640	Austria
€200	—		
€500	—		
Total	6,217	264,690	Belgium, Spain, France, Italy, Austria, Germany, Greece, Ireland, Portugal, Cyprus, Estonia, Malta, Latvia, Lithuania, Luxembourg, Netherlands, Slovenia, Slovakia, Finland

Banknotes produced in 2015
Denomination	Quantity (millions)	Value (€ millions)	NCBs commissioning production
€5	600	3,000	Belgium, Spain, Portugal
€10	1,200	12,000	Estonia, Ireland, Greece, France, Cyprus, Luxembourg, Malta, the Netherlands, Austria, Slovenia, Slovakia, Finland
€20	1,700	34,000	Germany, France, Italy
€50	2,500	125,000	Belgium, Germany, Estonia, Spain, France, Italy, Cyprus, Luxembourg, Malta, the Netherlands, Latvia, Portugal, Slovenia, Slovakia, Finland
€100	—		
€200	—		
€500	—		
Total	6,000	171,300	Belgium, Spain, France, Italy, Austria, Germany, Greece, Ireland, Portugal, Cyprus, Estonia, Malta, Latvia, Luxembourg, Netherlands, Slovenia, Slovakia, Finland

Banknotes produced in 2014
Denomination	Quantity (millions)	Value (€ millions)	NCBs commissioning production
€5	825	4,125	Belgium, Greece, Spain, Ireland
€10	94	940	Greece
€20	3,994	79,880	Germany, Spain, France, Italy, Austria, Portugal
€50	2,800	140,000	Belgium, Germany, Cyprus, Estonia, Spain, Italy, Malta, Luxembourg, the Netherlands, Slovenia, Slovakia, Finland
€100	500	50,000	Germany
€200	47	9,400	Germany
€500	85	42,500	Austria
Total	8,345	326,845	Belgium, Spain, France, Italy, Austria, Germany, Greece, Ireland, Portugal, Cyprus, Estonia, Malta, Luxembourg, Netherlands, Slovenia, Slovakia, Finland

Banknotes produced in 2013
Denomination	Quantity (millions)	Value (€ millions)	NCBs commissioning production
€5	—		
€10	4,500	45,000	Germany, Cyprus, Estonia, Greece, Spain, France, Ireland, Italy, Malta, Luxembourg, Netherlands, Austria, Slovenia, Slovakia, Finland
€20	2,500	50,000	Germany, Cyprus, Estonia, Greece, France, Italy, Malta, Luxembourg, Netherlands, Portugal, Slovenia, Slovakia, Finland
€50	1,000	50,000	Belgium, Germany, Spain
€100	—		
€200	—		
€500	—		
Total	8,000	145,000	Belgium, Spain, France, Italy, Austria, Germany, Greece, Ireland, Portugal, Cyprus, Estonia, Malta, Luxembourg, Netherlands, Slovenia, Slovakia, Finland

Banknotes produced in 2012
Denomination	Quantity (millions)	Value (€ millions)	NCBs commissioning production
€5	2,915.30	14,576.52	Belgium, Spain, France, Italy, Austria
€10	1,959.04	19,590.45	Germany, Greece, France, Ireland, Portugal
€20	1,703.95	34,079.03	Cyprus, Estonia, France, Italy, Malta, Luxembourg, Netherlands, Slovenia, Slovakia, Finland
€50	1,530.43	76,521.70	Belgium, Germany, Spain, Italy
€100	298.13	29,813.20	Germany
€200	50.00	10,000.04	Germany
€500	—		
Total	8,456.87	184,580.95	Belgium, Spain, France, Italy, Austria, Germany, Greece, Ireland, Portugal, Cyprus, Estonia, Malta, Luxembourg, Netherlands, Slovenia, Slovakia, Finland

Banknotes produced in 2011
Denomination	Quantity (millions)	Value (€ millions)	NCBs commissioning production
€5	1,714.80	8,574.00	Germany, Cyprus, Spain, France, Ireland, Malta Luxembourg, Netherlands, Slovenia, Slovakia, Finland
€10	1,541.20	15,412.00	Germany, Greece, France, Austria, Portugal
€20	536.60	10,732.00	Cyprus, France, Malta, Luxembourg, Netherlands, Slovenia, Slovakia, Finland
€50	2,169.10	108,455.00	Belgium, Germany, Spain, Italy
€100	—		
€200	—		
€500	56.20	28,100.00	Austria
Total	6,017.90	171,273.00	Belgium, Spain, France, Italy, Austria, Germany, Greece, Ireland, Portugal, Cyprus, Estonia, Malta, Luxembourg, Netherlands, Slovenia, Slovakia, Finland

== €1 and €2 notes ==
On 18 November 2004 the ECB decided that there was insufficient demand across the eurozone for very low-denomination banknotes. On 25 October 2005, however, a majority of MEPs supported a motion calling on the European Commission and the European Central Bank to recognise the need for the introduction of €1 and €2 banknotes. There have not been any official calls for these in recent years.

== €0 notes ==
In 2015, French entrepreneur Richard Faille developed the idea of souvenir euro notes made to the same standards as the currency, but without value, to commemorate places or events. These notes have a denomination of zero euro. While such notes are not printed or sanctioned by the European Central Bank, they can be printed by the official printing plants, and offer many of the same security features.

For the Spanish banknotes, it includes the design of the Aqueduct of Segovia and the Sagrada Familia.

== See also ==
- Banknote processing
- Currency note tracking
- EuroBillTracker
- Euro coins
- History of the euro
