= Spijkenisse Eurobridges =

Bridge construction project in Spijkenisse, Netherlands

The Spijkenisse Eurobridges (Dutch: Spijkenisser Eurobruggen) are an applied arts project in the city of Spijkenisse, in the Dutch province of South Holland. The project was built in the residential area Het Land.

The bridges were designed to represent the images on the reverse of euro banknotes. The bridges of the 10 and 50 euro banknotes were opened on 26 October 2011 by the then Queen's commissioner of South Holland, Jan Franssen. The 5 and 20 eurobridges were placed after, with only one side representing the banknotes. The 200 eurobridge opened on 17 October 2012. The final eurobridges, representing the 100 and 500 banknotes, opened on 26 September 2013.

The bridges were designed by Robin Stam. They are made from a concrete base with coloured concrete panels placed on the sides.

Value	Opening	Location	Image	Banknote
5 euro		51°50′58.0″N 4°20′24.9″E	Bridge of the 5 Eur note	
10 euro	26 Oct. 2011	51°51′8.7″N 4°20′16.9″E	€10	
20 euro		51°50′57.3″N 4°20′24.6″E		
50 euro	26 Oct. 2011	51°51′07.4″N 4°20′13.7″E		
100 euro	26 Sep. 2013	51°50′55.9″N 4°20′22″E		
200 euro	17 Oct. 2012	51°50′59.5″N 4°20′27.4″E		
500 euro	26 Sep. 2013	51°51′04.5″N 4°20′8.3″E	Bridge of the 500 Euro note	
