= Robert Kalina =

Austrian designer (born 1955)

- Born: 29 June 1955 (age 71); Vienna, Austria
- Known for: Designing the euro banknotes

Robert Kalina (born 29 June 1955) is an Austrian designer. For the National Bank of Austria he created the T 382 design, which was the winning design of the 1996 competition for the art shown on the euro banknotes. Kalina's design was chosen by the EMI Council (European Monetary Institute) on 3 December 1996. However, his initial designs were supposed to feature imaginary bridges, but were discovered to actually be based on real bridges taken from the book Bridges - 300 Years of Defying Nature and had to be redesigned.

Kalina also designed the banknotes for the Azerbaijani manat, the 2010 series of the Syrian pound and the highest-denomination banknote for Bosnia and Herzegovina convertible mark in 2002.

== See also ==
- Luc Luycx
