= Third series euro redesign =

Planned redesign of euro banknotes

Since 2021, the European Central Bank (ECB) has been in the process of redesigning the euro banknotes. The third series is the first complete overhaul of the banknotes since its inception in 2002. Two themes were chosen in 2023: "European culture" and "Rivers and birds". A shortlist of 10 designs was published in 2026 after a design contest. The ECB is expected to complete the redesign and have the banknotes enter circulation within the next few years.

== Background ==
The euro was introduced in 1999 as a common currency for European Union (EU) member states. The currency's cash form was introduced in 2002 with the first series, featuring various architectural styles of bridges and doorways over 7 denominations from €5 to €500. The second series, or Europa series, was introduced between 2013 and 2019. It increased security features and improved durability, as well as retiring the €500 note, but did not include a redesign of the banknotes.

== Design process ==
In 2021, the ECB announced that they planned to redesign the euro banknotes in a third series. According to President of the ECB Christine Lagarde, this was to make them "more relatable" and to reduce the environmental impact of cash production. In 2023, two themes were chosen by the Governing Council: "European cultures" and "Rivers and birds". The themes were decided based on a survey of the European public, conducted by Kantar Public (now Verian) between 10 July and 31 August 2023. It found that the most popular themes were "European culture" at 21%, "Rivers" at 18%, and "Birds" at 17%. The Governing Council combined the last two to make "Rivers and Birds". In early 2025, an advisory group at the ECB formed of 19 members, one from each country in the Eurozone, selected the motifs from the themes that are to be present on the banknotes.

To design the third series of euro banknotes, a public contest was held in summer 2026. 1,241 applications were entered, which were narrowed down to 39 designers. Those designers then submitted 25 complete series to the ECB. A jury formed of 21 experts from across Europe was convened in summer 2026 to decide on a shortlist of winners. The shortlist of 10 designs was revealed on 23 July 2026. The authors of the final designs were kept anonymous, as to not affect public opinion of the designs based on the designers.

After the design shortlist was revealed, a survey was opened by the ECB running from 23 July to 21 September 2026. The survey aims to collect opinions of the European public on the designs and eventually decide on which design to move forward with.

== Designs ==
Design motifs for the third series
Value	European culture	Rivers and birds
€5	Maria Callas	Mountain spring/Wallcreeper
€10	Ludwig van Beethoven	Waterfall/Kingfisher
€20	Marie Curie	River valley/Bee-eater
€50	Miguel de Cervantes	Meandering river/White stork
€100	Leonardo da Vinci	River mouth/Pied avocet
€200	Bertha von Suttner	Seascape/Northern gannet

The "European culture" set focuses on portraits on the obverse and groups on the reverse. In ascending order by denomination, on the obverse Maria Callas represents the performing arts, Ludwig van Beethoven represents music, Marie Curie represents education, Miguel de Cervantes represents literature, Leonardo da Vinci represents art, and Bertha von Suttner represents peace. On the reverse, the banknotes feature, again in ascending order, street performers, a youth choir, a classroom and students, a library, people looking at street art, and a busy, tree-covered plaza.

Similarly, the "Rivers and birds" set features birds and natural water features on the observe and EU government buildings on the reverse. The obverse designs feature two motifs: a singular bird as well as water features that move closer to the sea as the value of the note increases. In ascending order by value, these notes feature a wallcreeper and mountain spring, a kingfisher and waterfall, a bee-eater and river valley, a white stork and meandering river, an avocet and river mouth, and northern gannet and seascape. The reverse of the notes feature the buildings of the European Parliament, the European Commission, the European Central Bank, the European Court of Justice, the European Council, and the European Court of Auditors.

== Circulation ==
As of July 2026, the ECB has not published a full timetable for when the new series of banknotes will enter circulation. According to their website, the banknotes will begin production at the end of 2026 once a final design is chosen. ECB president Christine Lagarde said in 2025 that the banknotes would enter circulation in 2028, but this has not been confirmed since. Euronews reported in August 2026 that it may take until 2029 for the banknotes to enter circulation.

== Reactions ==
The decision of the ECB to write "Marie Curie (born Skłodowska)" on the €20 note attracted some criticism from Curie's birth country of Poland. She was born with the surname Skłodowska but changed it to Curie after marrying Pierre Curie, a Frenchman. In response, the ECB said that it would take the criticism into account, and that the current wording was a draft for the design.

On 30 July, the Directorate of Defence of Luxembourg posted on social media an AI-generated mockup of military-focused designs for new Euros. The Directorate of Defence said that the post was intended to comment on the importance of defence to Europe. However, it caused controversy in Luxembourg and on social media, with a union leader in the defence sector calling the post "in poor taste".

== See also ==
- Euro banknotes
