= 50 euro note =

Banknote of the European Union

Fifty euro
- Country: Eurozone (mainly) and other countries
- Value: 50 euro
- Width: 140 mm
- Height: 77 mm
- Security features: Colour-changing ink, see-through number, hologram patch with perforations, EURion constellation, watermarks, raised printing, ultraviolet ink, microprinting, security thread, matted surface, barcodes and a serial number
- Material used: 100% pure cotton fibre
- Years of printing: 1999–2015 (1st series); Since 2015 (Europa series)

Obverse
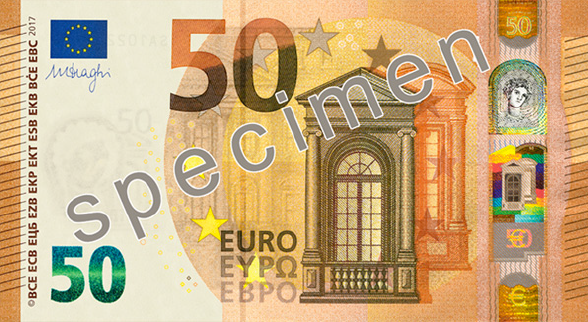
- Design: Window in Renaissance architecture
- Designer: Robert Kalina (1st series); Reinhold Gerstetter (Europa series)
- Design date: 3 December 1996 (1st series); 5 July 2016 (Europa series)

Reverse
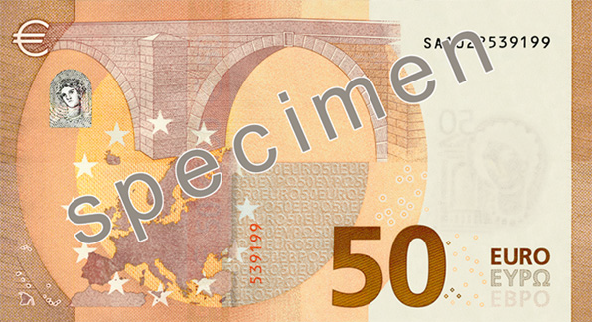
- Design: Bridge in Renaissance architecture and map of Europe
- Designer: Robert Kalina (1st series); Reinhold Gerstetter (Europa series)
- Design date: 3 December 1996 (1st series); 5 July 2016 (Europa series)

The fifty-euro note (€50) is one of the middle value euro banknotes and has been used since the introduction of the euro (in its cash form) in 2002.

The note is the official currency of 21 of the 27 member states of the European Union, which are part of the Eurozone. The 21 Eurozone members are: Austria, Belgium, Bulgaria, Croatia, Cyprus, Estonia, Finland, France, Germany, Greece, Ireland, Italy, Latvia, Lithuania, Luxembourg, Malta, the Netherlands, Portugal, Slovakia, Slovenia, and Spain.

A number of non-EU member states, namely Andorra, Monaco, San Marino, and Vatican City have formal agreements with the EU to use the euro as their official currency and issue their own coins. In addition, Kosovo and Montenegro have adopted the euro unilaterally.

The countries that use the euro have a total population of about 350 million. In April 2026, there were about 15,386,000,000 fifty euro banknotes in circulation in the eurozone. It is by far the most widely circulated denomination, accounting for almost half (49.0%) of the total banknotes. Estimates suggest that the average life of a fifty euro banknote is about four years before it is replaced due to wear.

It is the fourth smallest note, measuring 140 mm × 77 mm, and has an orange colour scheme. The note depicts bridges and arches/doorways in the Renaissance era (15th and 16th centuries). The €50 note contains several complex security features such as watermarks, invisible ink, holograms and microprinting that document its authenticity.

The design of the Europa series 50 euro banknote was revealed on 5 July 2016 and launched on 4 April 2017.

== History ==
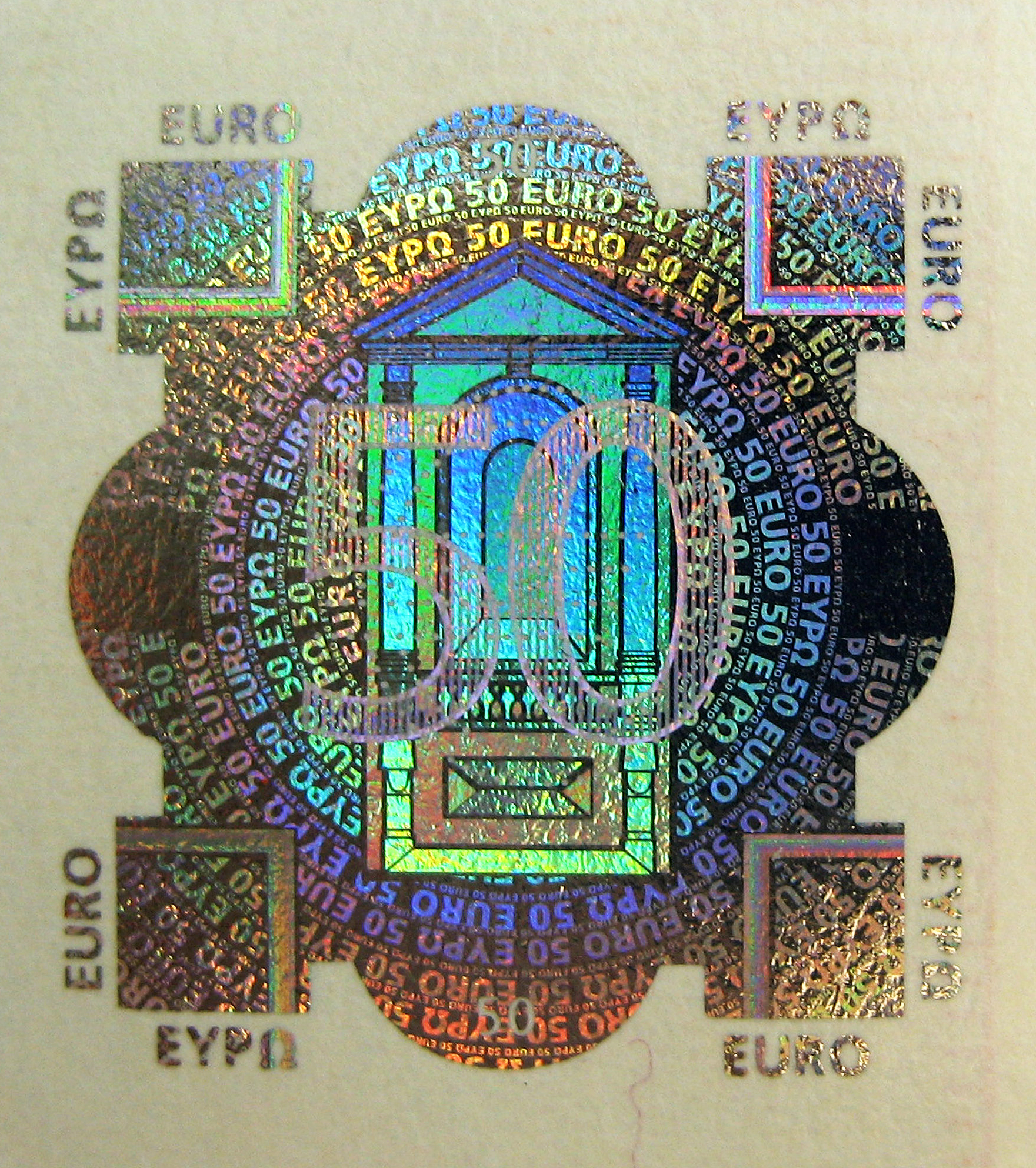
The hologram on the 50 euro note

50 euro note of the 2002-2017 series

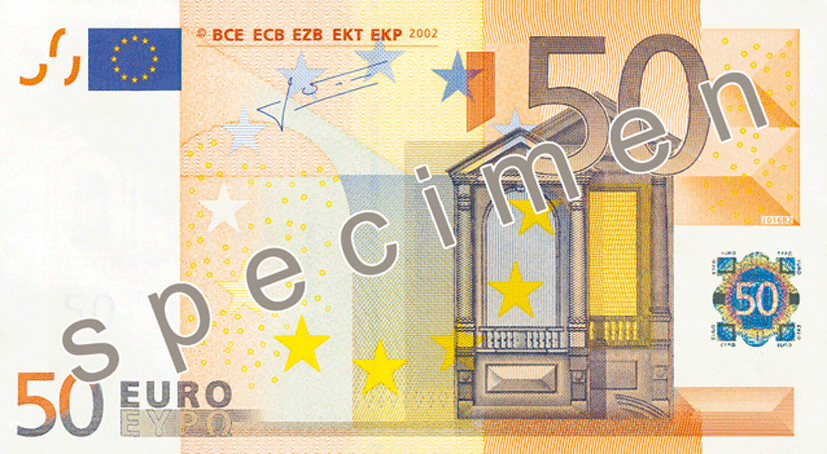
Obverse

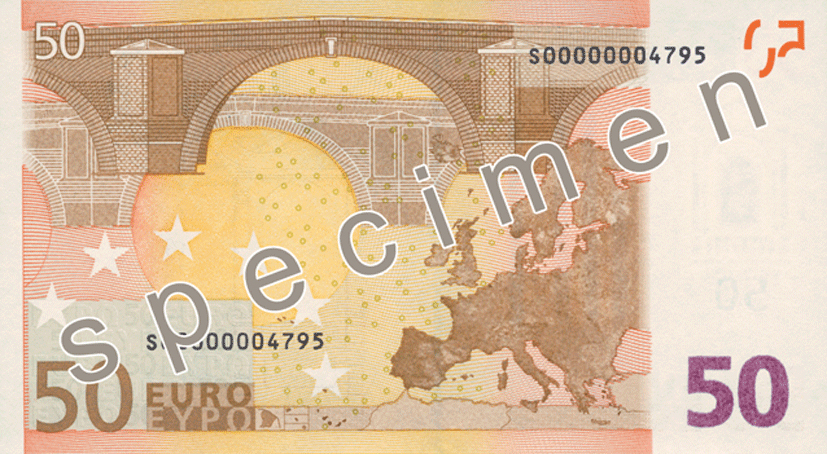
Reverse

The euro was founded on 1 January 1999, when it became the currency of over 300 million people in Europe. For the first three years of its existence it was an invisible currency, only used in accounting. Euro cash was not introduced until 1 January 2002, when it replaced the national banknotes and coins of the 12 countries in the eurozone, such as the Dutch guilder and the Portuguese escudo.

Slovenia joined the Eurozone on 1 January 2007, Cyprus and Malta on 1 January 2008, Slovakia on 1 January 2009, Estonia on 1 January 2011, Latvia on 1 January 2014, Lithuania on 1 January 2015, Croatia on 1 January 2023 and Bulgaria on 1 January 2026.

=== The changeover period ===
The changeover period during which the former currencies' notes and coins were exchanged for those of the euro lasted about two months, from 1 January 2002 until 28 February 2002. The official date on which the national currencies ceased to be legal tender varied from member state to member state. The earliest date was in Germany, where the mark officially ceased to be legal tender on 31 December 2001, though the exchange period lasted for two months more. Even after the old currencies ceased to be legal tender, they continue to be accepted by national central banks for periods ranging from ten years to forever.

=== Changes ===
Notes printed before November 2003 bear the signature of the first President of the European Central Bank, Wim Duisenberg, who was replaced on 1 November 2003 by Jean-Claude Trichet, whose signature appears on issues from November 2003 to March 2012. Notes issued from March 2012 to July 2020 bear the signature of the third President, Mario Draghi. Notes issued since July 2020 bear the signature of the fourth President, Christine Lagarde.

Until May 2013 there was only one series of euro notes. However, a new series similar to the first one was planned to be released. The bank notes would be replaced in ascending order. Therefore, the first new note was the five-euro note that has been in circulation since 2 May 2013. Its new design was made public on 10 January 2013 in the Archaeological Museum of Frankfurt (Germany). While broadly similar to the previous notes, minor design changes include an updated map and a hologram of Europa. Moreover, the new notes reflect the expansion of the European Union; the previous issues do not include the members Cyprus and Malta (Cyprus is off the map to the east and Malta was too small to be depicted). It would be the first time in which the Bulgarian Cyrillic alphabet would be used on the banknotes as a result of Bulgaria joining the European Union in 2007. Therefore, the new series of Euro banknotes would include "ЕВРО", which is the Bulgarian spelling for EURO as well as the abbreviation "ЕЦБ" (short for Европейска централна банка in Bulgarian).

The design of the Europa series 50 euro banknote was revealed on 5 July 2016 and launched on 4 April 2017. Banknotes from the first series are legal tender and will always retain their value. They will continue to circulate alongside the Europa series until the remaining stocks have been used up.

A third series of banknotes, with an entirely new design, is due to be issued by the ECB starting in the late 2020s. Two themes for the new design, "European culture" and "Rivers and birds" were presented in November 2023, with the motifs chosen for each theme and denomination and theme being presented in January 2025. If the former theme is chosen, fifty-euro notes will depict the Spanish writer Miguel de Cervantes on the obverse, and a group of patrons reading books in a library on the reverse. If the latter theme is chosen, they will depict a white stork flying over a meandering river on the obverse, and the seat of the Court of Justice of the European Union on the reverse.

== Design ==
50 euro banknote under fluorescent light (UV-A)

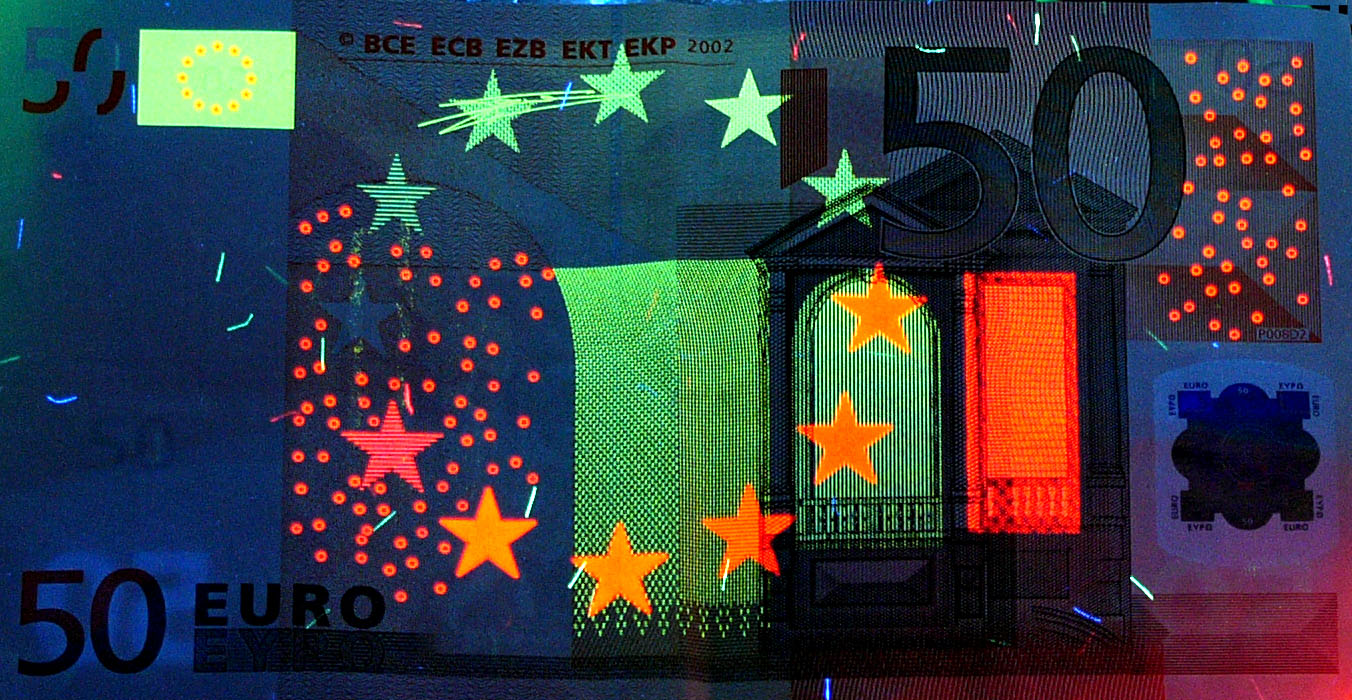
Obverse

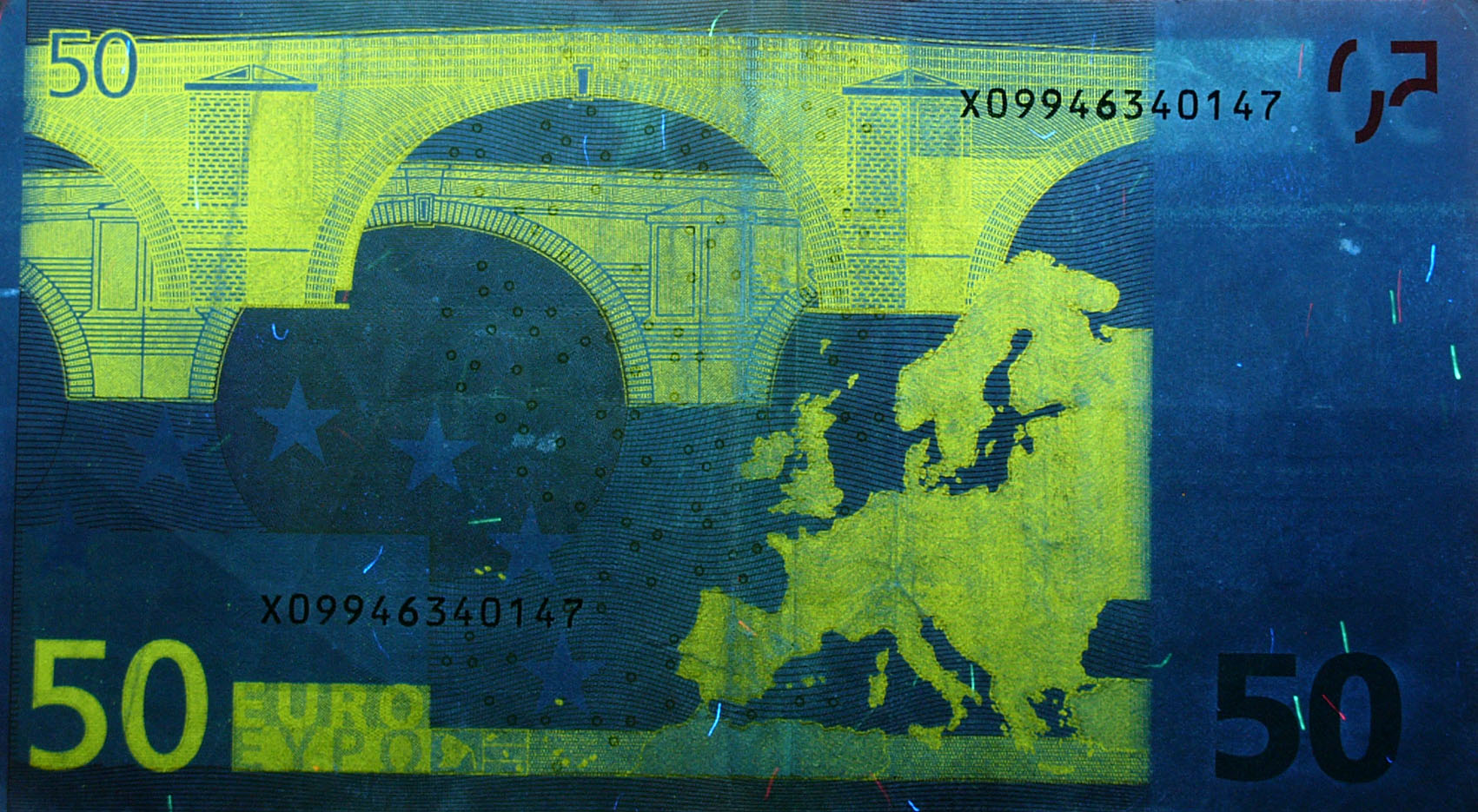
Reverse

The fifty euro note is the fourth smallest note, measuring 140 millimetres (5.5 in) × 77 millimetres (3.0 in), with an orange colour scheme. Each euro banknote depicts bridges and arches/doorways in a different historical European style; the €50 note shows the Renaissance era (15th and 16th centuries). Although Robert Kalina's original designs were intended to show real monuments, for political reasons the bridge and the window are merely hypothetical examples of the architectural era.

Like all euro notes, the €50 note shows the denomination, the EU flag, the signature of the president of the ECB, the initials of the ECB in the different EU languages, a map of Europe, a depiction of EU territories overseas, the stars from the EU flag and various security features.

=== Security features (first series) ===
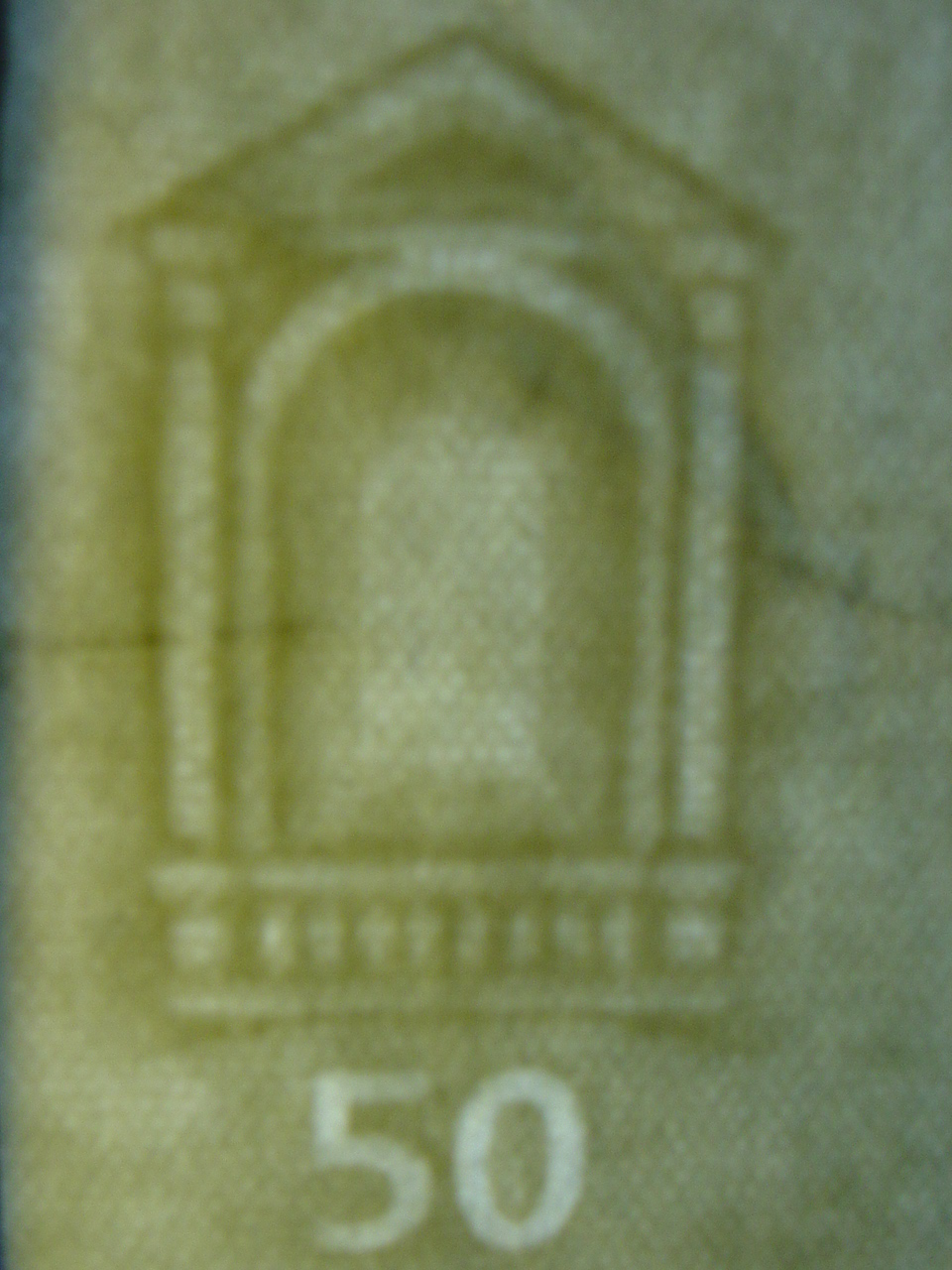
The watermark on the 50 euro note

The fifty euro note contains the following security features:

- Colour changing ink used on the numeral located on the back of the note, that appears to change colour from purple to brown, when the note is tilted.
- A see through number printed in the top corner of the note, on both sides, appear combine perfectly to form the value numeral when held against the light.
- A hologram, used on the note which appears to see the hologram image change between the value and a window or doorway, but in the background, it appears to be rainbow-coloured concentric circles of micro-letters moving from the centre to the edges of the patch.
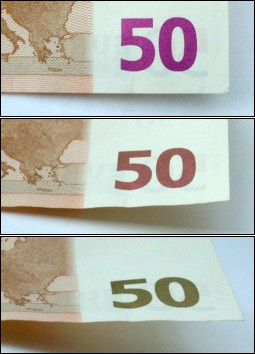
  Colour-shifting ink in the denomination
- A EURion constellation; the EURion constellation is a pattern of symbols found on a number of banknote designs worldwide since about 1996. It is added to help software detect the presence of a banknote in a digital image.
- Watermarks, which appear when held up to the light.
- Raised printing in the main image, the lettering and the value numerals on the front of the banknotes will be raised.
- Ultraviolet ink; the paper itself does not glow, fibres embedded in the paper do appear, and be coloured red, blue and green, the EU flag is green and has orange stars, the ECB President's, currently Mario Draghi's, signature turns green, the large stars and small circles on the front glow and the European map, a bridge and the value numeral on the back appear in yellow.
- Microprinting, on various areas of the banknotes there is microprinting, for example, inside the "ΕΥΡΩ" (EURO in Greek characters) on the front. The micro-text is sharp, but not blurred.
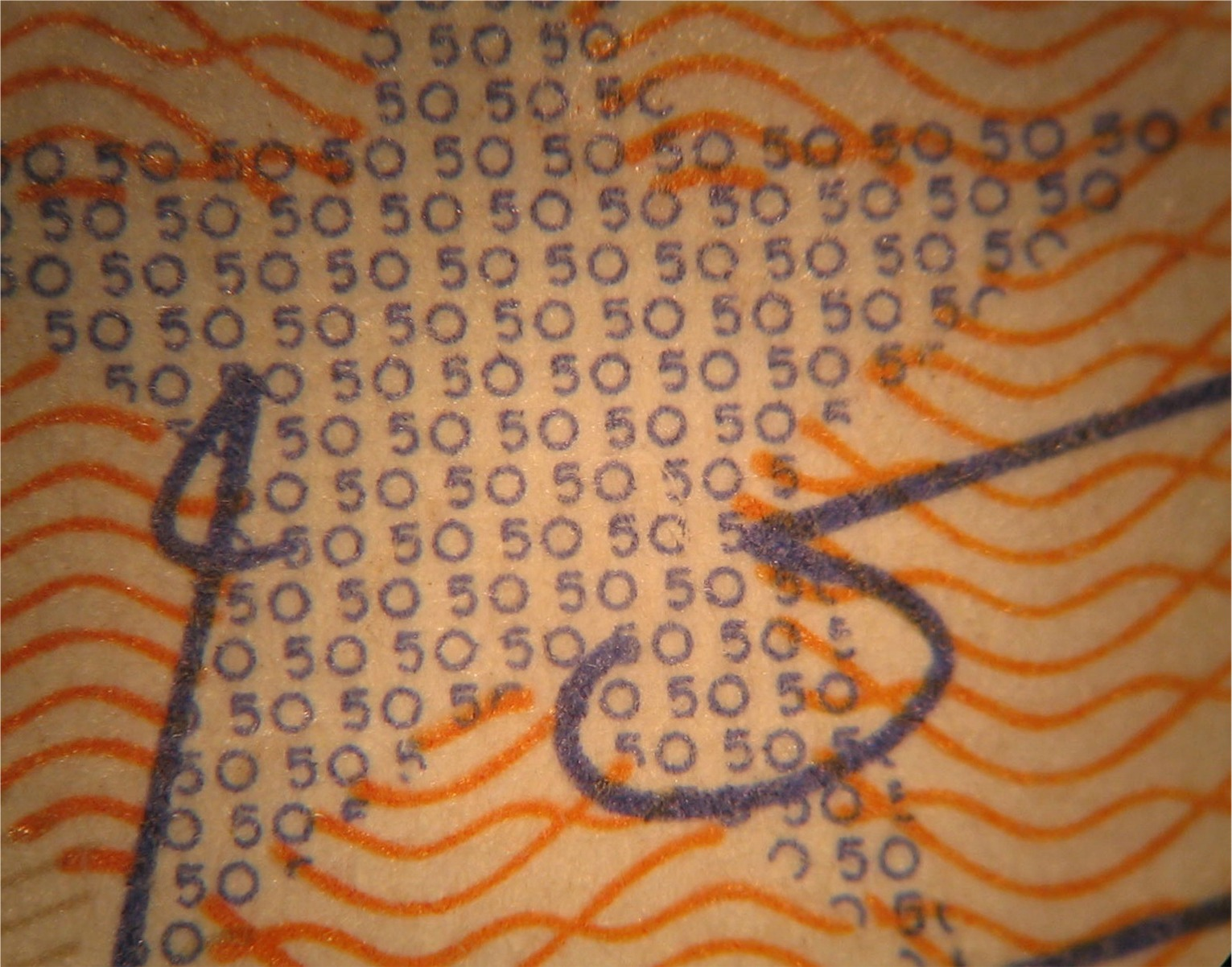
  Microprinting next to the ECB President's signature
- A security thread, embedded in the banknote paper. The thread will appear as a dark stripe when held up to the light. The word "EURO" and the value is embedded in tiny letters on the thread.
- Perforations in the hologram which will form the euro symbol. There are also small numbers showing the value.
- A matted surface; the note paper is made out of pure cotton, which feels crisp and firm, but not limp or waxy.
- Barcodes,
- A serial number.

=== Security features (Europa series) ===
- Watermark: When the note is held under a normal light source, a portrait of Europa and an electrotype denomination appear on either side.
- Portrait Window: When the note is held against the light, the window in the hologram becomes transparent and reveals a portrait of Europa which is visible on both sides of the note.
- Portrait Hologram: When the note is tilted, the hologram – the silver-coloured stripe on the right of the note – reveals a portrait of Europa as well as the "€" symbol, the main image and the value of the banknote.
- Emerald Number: When the note is tilted, the number "50" on the bottom left corner of the note displays an effect of the light that moves up and down. The number "50" also changes colour from emerald green to deep blue.
- Glossy stripe: When the note is tilted, a glossy stripe, situated at the back of the note, showing the value numeral and the euro symbol appears golden or nearly invisible, depending on viewing angle.
- Security Thread: When the note is held to the light, the security thread appears as a dark line. The "€" symbol and the value of the note can be seen in tiny white lettering in the stripe.
- Microprinting: Some areas of the banknote feature a series of tiny letters. The microprinting can be read with a magnifying glass. The letters are sharp, not blurred.
- Ultraviolet ink: Some parts of the banknote shine when under UV or UV-C light. These are the stars in the flag, the small circles, the large stars and several other areas on the front. On the back, a quarter of a circle in the centre as well as several other areas glow green. The horizontal serial number and a stripe appear in red.
- Infrared light: Under infrared light, the emerald number, the right side of the main image and the silvery stripe are visible on the obverse of the banknote, while on the reverse, only the denomination and the horizontal serial number are visible.

== Circulation ==
The European Central Bank closely monitors the circulation and stock of the euro coins and banknotes. It is a task of the Eurosystem to ensure an efficient and smooth supply of euro notes and to maintain their integrity throughout the euro area.

In December 2025, there were 15,367,854,171 €50 banknotes in circulation around the Eurozone. with a total value of €768,392,708,550. This is the number of banknotes issued by the Eurosystem central banks, without any distinction as to who is holding the currency issued, thus also including the stocks held by credit institutions.

The figures are as follows (3 November 2017):

Date	Banknotes	€ Value	Date	Banknotes	€ Value
January 2002	1,417,053,560	70,852,678,000	December 2009	5,199,440,707	259,972,035,350
December 2002	2,434,707,158	121,735,357,900	December 2010	5,550,160,896	277,508,044,800
December 2003	2,896,386,947	144,819,347,350	December 2011	6,045,145,732	302,257,286,600
December 2004	3,255,008,516	162,750,425,800	December 2012	6,437,178,183	321,858,909,150
December 2005	3,624,320,322	181,216,016,100	December 2013	6,962,832,968	348,141,648,400
December 2006	4,077,608,858	203,880,442,900	December 2014	7,508,631,958	375,431,597,900
December 2007	4,442,233,190	222,111,659,500	December 2015	8,398,272,519	419,913,625,950
December 2008	4,911,736,808	245,586,840,400	December 2016	9,231,380,229	461,569,011,450

On 4 April 2017, a new 'Europe' series was issued.

The first series of notes were issued in conjunction with those for a few weeks in the series 'Europe' until existing stocks are exhausted, then gradually withdrawn from circulation. Both series thus run parallel but the proportion tends inevitably to a sharp decrease in the first series.

Date	Banknotes	€ Value	Series '1' remainder	€ Value	Proportion
December 2017	9,826,239,828	491,311,991,400	7,202,485,936	360,124,296,800	73.3%
December 2018	10,446,866,397	522,343,319,850	5,575,235,652	278,761,782,600	53.4%
December 2019	11,216,209,023	560,810,451,150	4,504,551,206	225,227,560,300	40.2%
December 2020	12,724,868,337	636,243,416,850	3,961,795,038	198,089,751,900	31.1%
December 2021	13,684,375,433	684,218,771,650	3,541,489,557	177,074,477,850	25.9%
December 2022	14,430,405,946	721,520,297,300	3,164,581,973	158,229,098,650	21.9%
December 2023	14,625,114,601	731,255,730,050	2,811,507,819	140,575,390,950	19.2%
December 2024	15,001,616,313	750,080,815,650	2,519,446,550	125,972,327,500	16.8%
December 2025	15,367,854,171	768,392,708,550	2,256,737,150	112,836,857,500	14.7%

The latest figures provided by the ECB are the following :

Date	Banknotes	€ Value	Series '1' remainder	€ Value	Proportion
April 2026	15,385,778,212	769,288,910,600	2,173,409,965	108,670,498,250	14.1%

== Legal information ==
Legally, both the European Central Bank and the central banks of the eurozone countries have the right to issue the 7 different euro banknotes. In practice, only the national central banks of the zone physically issue and withdraw euro banknotes. The European Central Bank does not have a cash office and is not involved in any cash operations.

== Tracking ==
There are several communities of people at European level, such as EuroBillTracker, that keep track of the euro banknotes that pass through their hands, as a hobby. The aim is to keep track of the places to which the banknotes travel: how they spread, from where and to where they travel in general, and generate statistics and rankings, for example, in which countries there are more banknotes. EuroBillTracker has registered over 161 million notes as of November 2016, worth a total of more than €3 billion.
