= Pieter Duisenberg =

Dutch politician

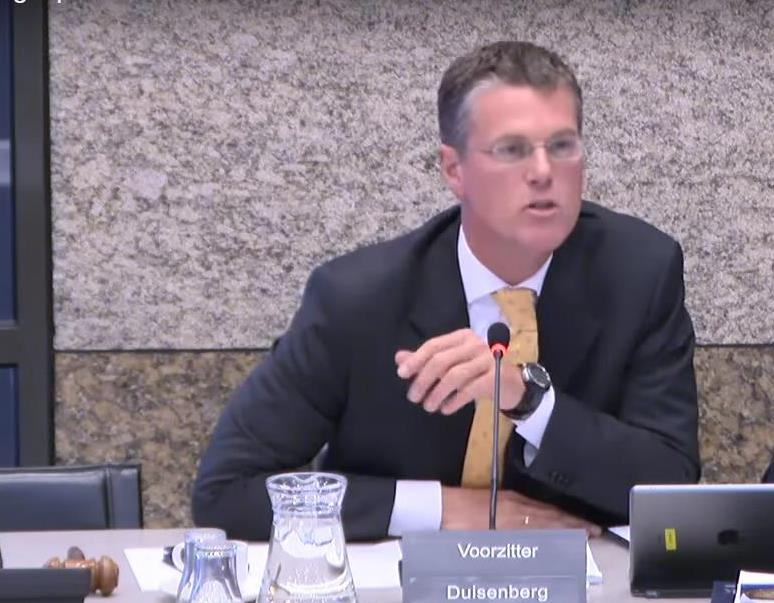
- Duisenberg in 2015

Member of the House of Representatives
- In office 20 September 2012 – 7 September 2017

Personal details
- Born: Pieter Jacob Duisenberg; 2 June 1967 (age 59) Washington, DC, United States
- Party: People's Party for Freedom and Democracy
- Spouse: Anja Mutsaers
- Children: 3
- Parent: Wim Duisenberg (father)
- Education: Erasmus University Rotterdam; Master of Economics; Vrije Universiteit Amsterdam; Master of Financial Economics

Pieter Jacob Duisenberg (born 2 June 1967) is an American-born Dutch politician and businessman who served as a member of the House of Representatives from 2012 to 2017 for the People's Party for Freedom and Democracy (VVD). He resigned to become chairman of the Vereniging van Universiteiten per 1 October 2017. He is the son of Wim Duisenberg (1935–2005), the first President of the European Central Bank.

== Education ==
Duisenberg was born in Washington, DC while his father was working at the International Monetary Fund (IMF). After attending the Eerste Vrijzinnig-Christelijk Lyceum in The Hague from 1979 to 1985, he studied at the Erasmus University Rotterdam from 1990 to 1995, where he gained Bachelor of Economics and Master of Economics degrees. He also studied at the Vrije Universiteit Amsterdam 1992 until 1994 and received a Master of Financial Economics degree.

== Career ==
In his private career, Duisenberg worked for Shell, McKinsey & Company and Eneco. In the 2012 general election, he was elected to the House of Representatives. He resigned in 2017 to become chairman of the Vereniging van Universiteiten. Duisenberg started serving as president of the Court of Audit in September 2023.

== Family ==
His grandfather is Lammert Duisenberg from Heerenveen; Pieter is the son of former President of the European Central Bank (ECB) Wim Duisenberg. His father was member of the Labour Party and served as Minister of Finance from 1973 until 1977, a member of the House of Representatives in 1977 and 1978 and President of the Central Bank of the Netherlands from 1982 until 1997 when he became President of the European Monetary Institute (EMI).

Duisenberg is married to Anja Mutsaers and has Dutch citizenship. He held American citizenship by birth but renounced it in 2015.
