= 5 euro note =

Euro banknote

Five euro
- Country: Eurozone (mainly) and other countries
- Value: 5 euro
- Width: 120 mm
- Height: 62 mm
- Security features: First series: hologram stripe with perforations, reflective glossy stripe, EURion constellation, watermarks, raised printing, microprinting, ultraviolet ink, security thread, matted surface, see-through number, barcodes and serial number Europa series: portrait watermark, portrait hologram, emerald number
- Material used: Cotton fibre
- Years of printing: 1999–2011 (1st series). Since 2011 (Europa series).

Obverse
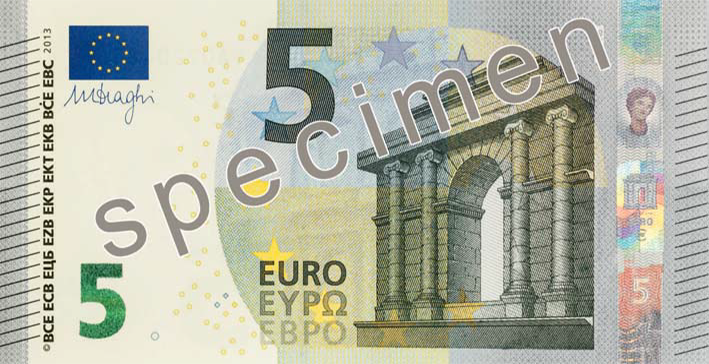
- Design: Arch in Classical architecture
- Designer: Robert Kalina (1st series); Reinhold Gerstetter (Europa series)
- Design date: 3 December 1996 (1st series); 10 January 2013 (Europa series)

Reverse
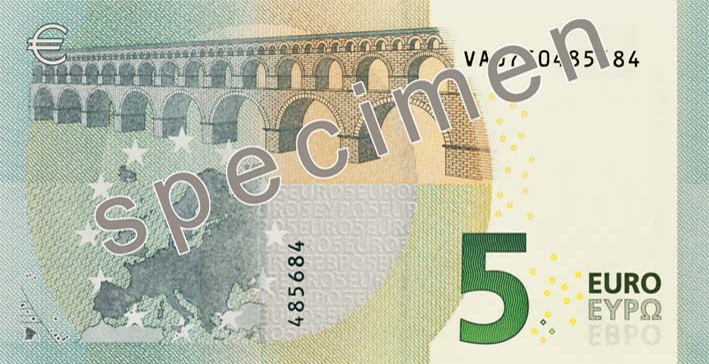
- Design: Bridge in Classical architecture and map of Europe
- Designer: Robert Kalina (1st series); Reinhold Gerstetter (Europa series)
- Design date: 3 December 1996 (1st series); 10 January 2013 (Europa series)

The five-euro note (€5) is the lowest value of euro banknotes. It has been used since the introduction of the euro (in its cash form) in 2002.

The note is the official currency of 21 of the 27 member states of the European Union, which are part of the Eurozone. The 21 Eurozone members are: Austria, Belgium, Bulgaria, Croatia, Cyprus, Estonia, Finland, France, Germany, Greece, Ireland, Italy, Latvia, Lithuania, Luxembourg, Malta, the Netherlands, Portugal, Slovakia, Slovenia, and Spain.

A number of non-EU member states, namely Andorra, Monaco, San Marino, and Vatican City have formal agreements with the EU to use the euro as their official currency and issue their own coins. In addition, Kosovo and Montenegro have adopted the euro unilaterally.

The countries that use the euro have a total population of about 350 million currently. In April 2026, there were approximately 2,325,559,164 five-euro banknotes in circulation around the eurozone. It is the fifth-most widely circulated denomination, accounting for 7.2% of the total banknotes. Estimates suggest that the average life of a five-euro banknote is less than a year before it is replaced due to wear.

Measuring 120 x 62 mm, it is the smallest of the euro notes, and has a grey colour scheme. The five-euro banknotes depict bridges and arches/doorways in Classical architecture (8th century BC–4th century AD). The five-euro note contains several complex security features such as watermarks, invisible ink, holograms and microprinting that document its authenticity.

On 8 November 2012, the European Central Bank announced the first series of notes will be replaced by the Europa series, starting with the five-euro note. The design of the Europa series 5 euro banknote was revealed on 10 January 2013 and launched on 2 May 2013.

== History ==
The euro was founded on 1 January 1999, when it became the currency of over 300 million people in Europe. For the first three years of its existence, it was an invisible currency, only used in accountancy. Euro cash was not introduced until 1 January 2002, when it replaced the national banknotes and coins of the countries in eurozone 12, such as the Irish pound and the Austrian schilling.

Slovenia joined the Eurozone on 1 January 2007, Cyprus and Malta on 1 January 2008, Slovakia on 1 January 2009, Estonia on 1 January 2011, Latvia on 1 January 2014, Lithuania on 1 January 2015, Croatia on 1 January 2023 and Bulgaria on 1 January 2026.

=== The changeover period ===
The changeover period during which the former currencies' notes and coins were exchanged for those of the euro lasted about two months, going from 1 January 2002 until 28 February 2002. The official date on which the national currencies ceased to be legal tender varied from member state to member state. The earliest date was in Germany, where the mark officially ceased to be legal tender on 31 December 2001, though the exchange period lasted for two months more. Even after the old currencies ceased to be legal tender, they continued to be accepted by national central banks for periods ranging from ten years to forever.

=== Changes ===
Notes printed before November 2003 bear the signature of the first President of the European Central Bank, Wim Duisenberg, who was replaced on 1 November 2003 by Jean-Claude Trichet, whose signature appears on issues from November 2003 to March 2012. Notes issued from March 2012 to July 2020 bear the signature of the third President, Mario Draghi. Notes issued since July 2020 bear the signature of the fourth President, Christine Lagarde.

Design for the first series of five euro notes

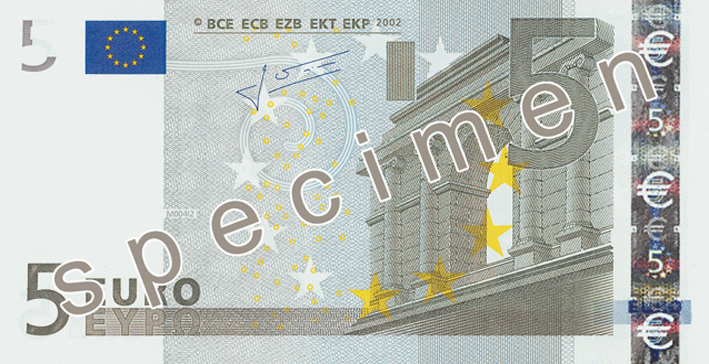
Obverse

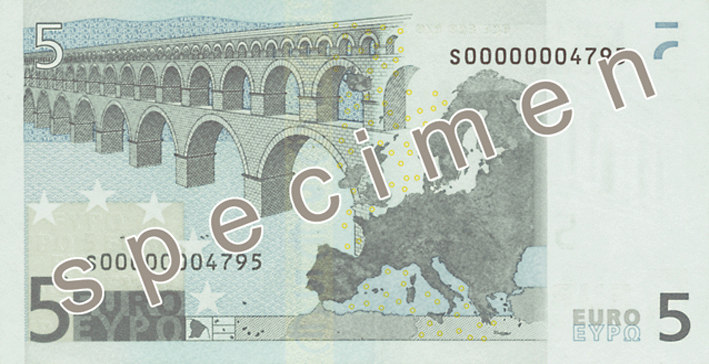
Reverse

5 euro banknote under fluorescent light (UV-A) (1st series)

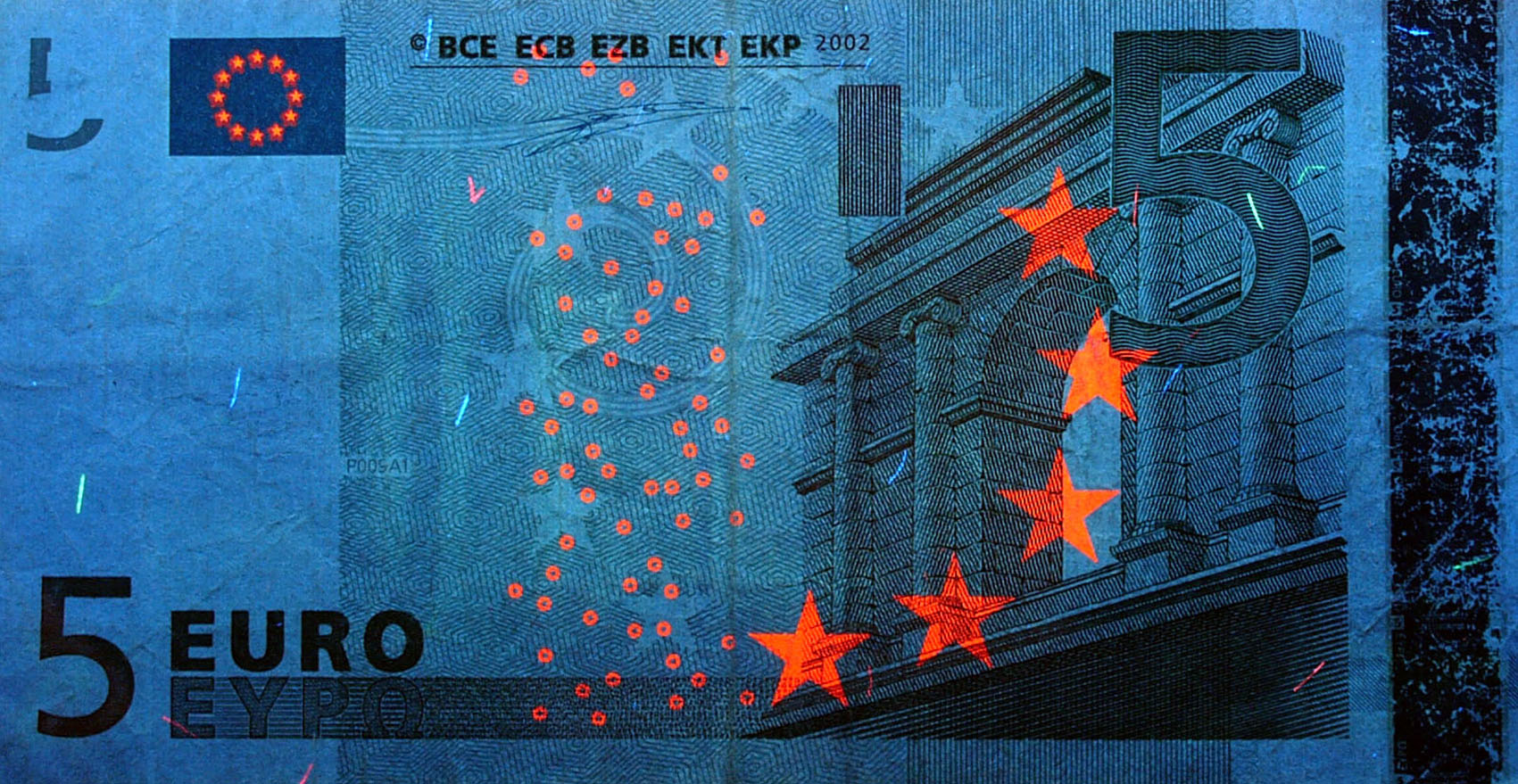
Obverse

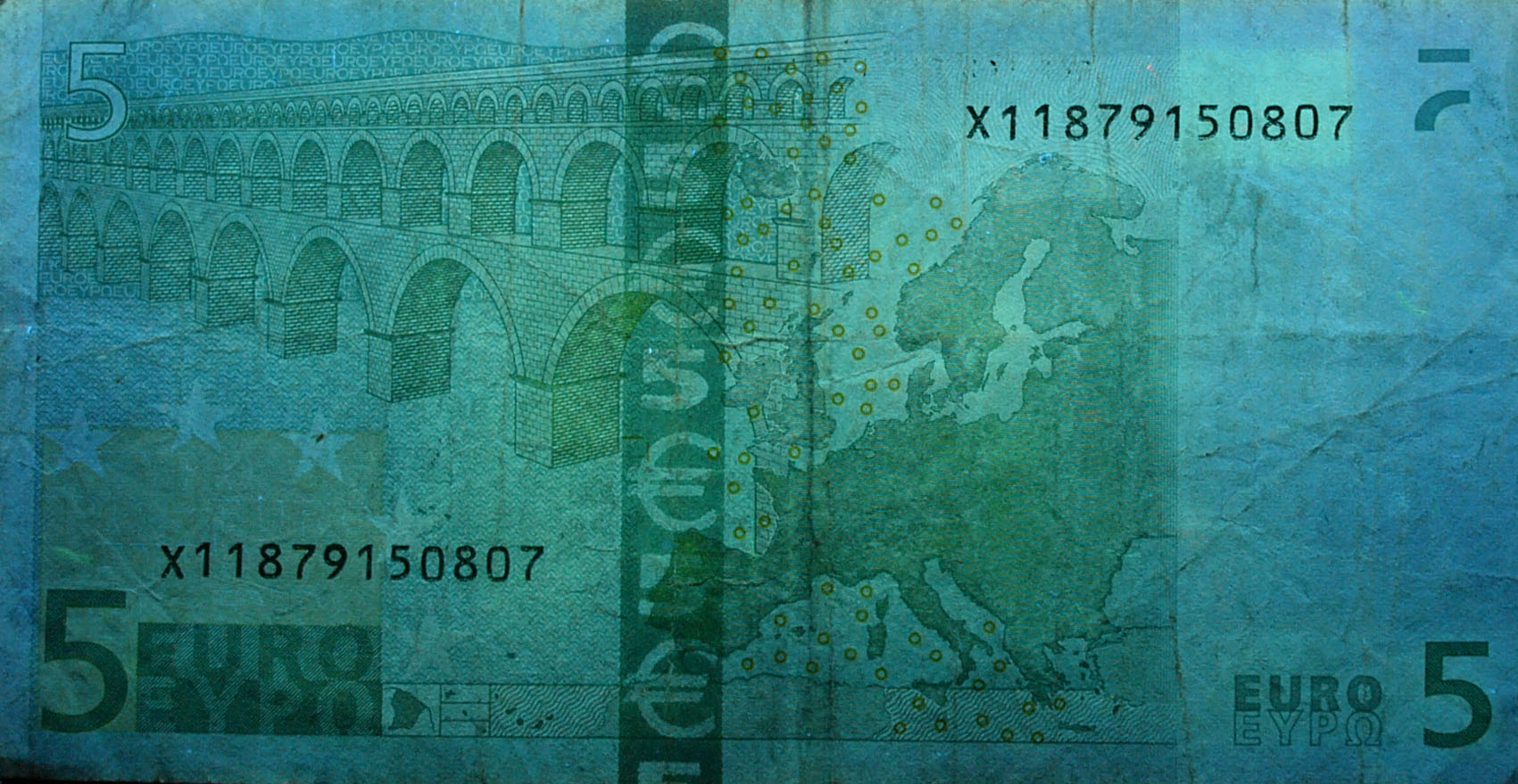
Reverse

5 euro banknote under fluorescent light (UV-A) (Europa series)

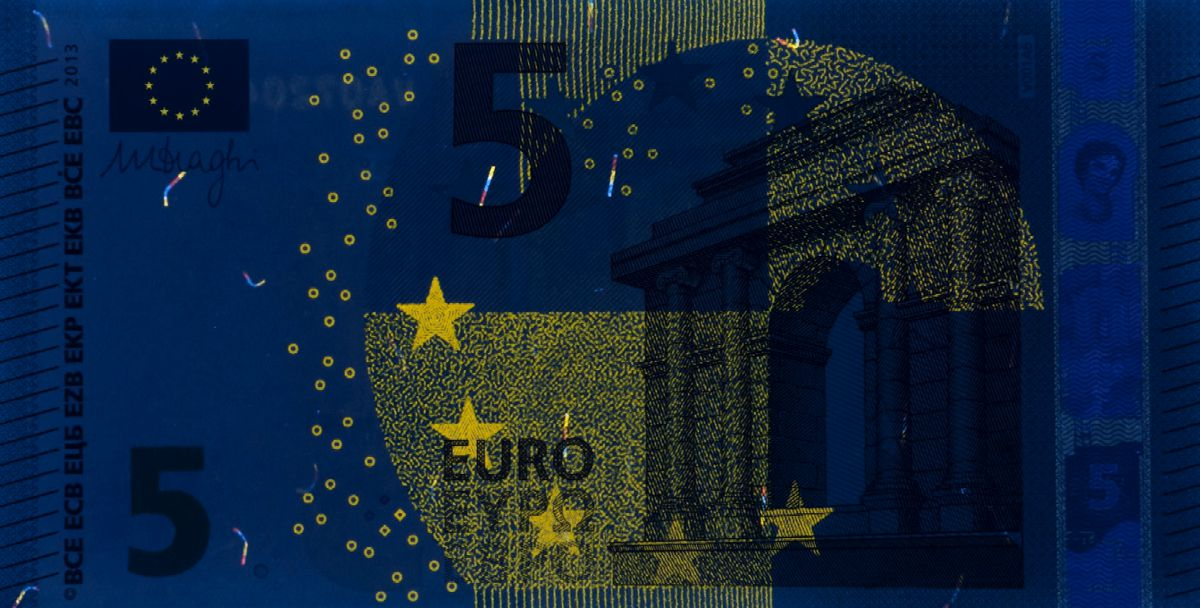
Obverse

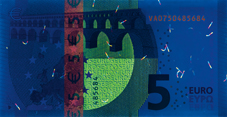
Reverse

Until May 2013 there was only one series of euro notes, however a new series, similar to the first one, was planned to be released. The bank notes would be replaced in ascending order. Therefore, the first new note was the five-euro note that has been in circulation since 2 May 2013. Its new design was made public on 10 January 2013 in the Archaeological Museum of Frankfurt (Germany). While broadly similar to the previous notes, minor design changes include an updated map and a hologram of Europa. Moreover, the new notes reflect the expansion of the European Union; the previous issues do not include the members Cyprus and Malta (Cyprus is off the map to the east and Malta was too small to be depicted). It would be the first time in which the Bulgarian Cyrillic alphabet would be used on the banknotes as a result of Bulgaria joining the European Union in 2007. Therefore, the new series of Euro banknotes would include "ЕВРО", which is the Bulgarian spelling for EURO as well as the abbreviation "ЕЦБ" (short for Европейска централна банка in Bulgarian). Banknotes from the first series are legal tender and will always retain their value. They will continue to circulate alongside the Europa series until the remaining stocks have been used up.

As a curiosity, the five euro banknotes of the first series did not bear the signature of Mario Draghi, despite the fact that his mandate began on 1 November 2011 and the design of the five euro banknotes of the second series is from January 2013.

A third series of banknotes, with an entirely new design, is due to be issued by the ECB starting in the late 2020s. Two themes for the new design, "European culture" and "Rivers and birds" were presented in November 2023, with the motifs chosen for each theme and denomination and theme being presented in January 2025. If the former theme is chosen, five-euro notes will depict the Greek soprano Maria Callas on the obverse, and a group of street performers on the reverse. If the latter theme is chosen, they will depict a wallcreeper and mountain spring on the obverse, and the seat of the European Parliament on the reverse.

== Design ==
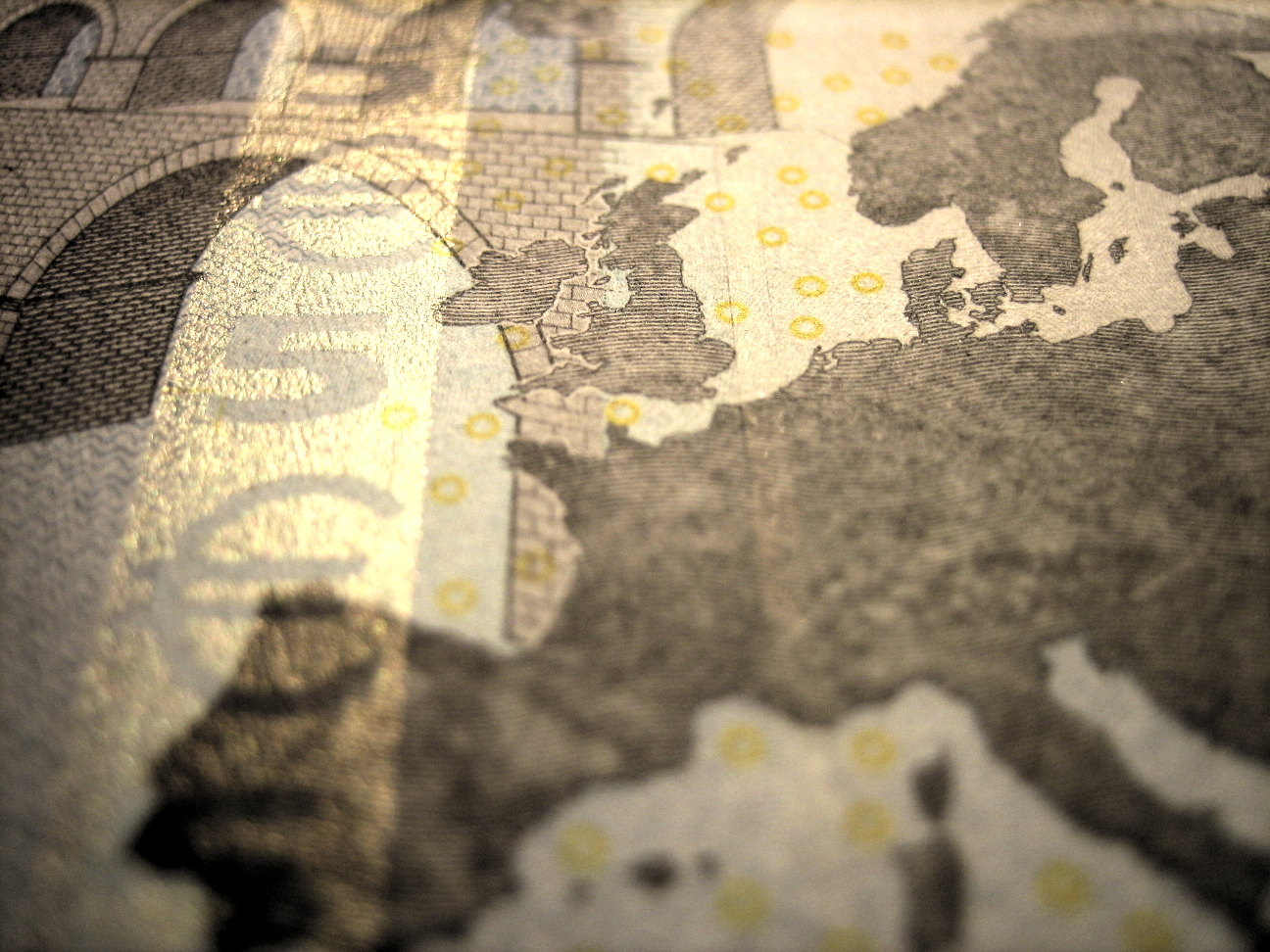
Close up of the reverse; a map of Europe and a classical era bridge

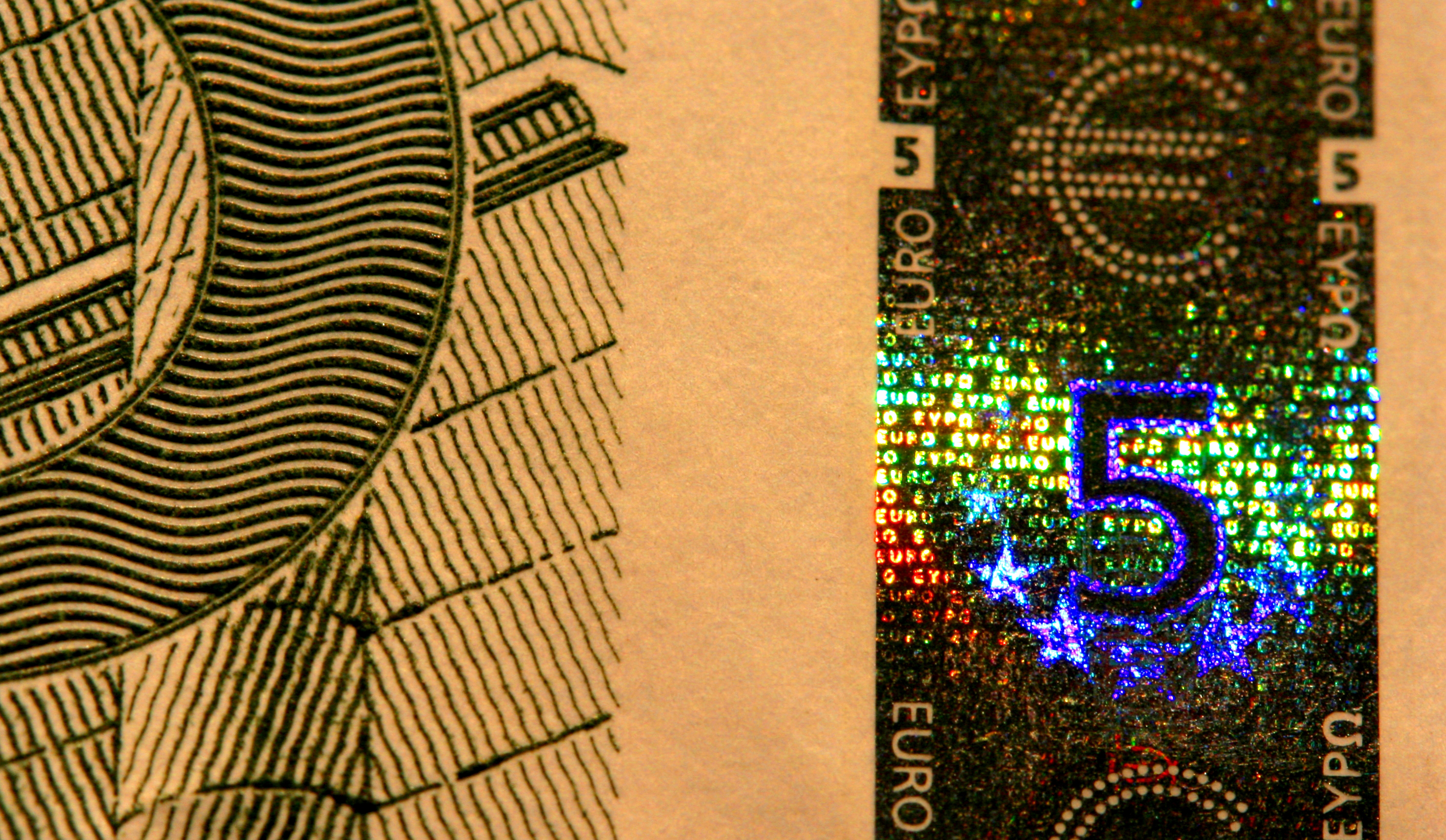
Holographic band on the five euro note

5 euro banknote under special ultraviolet light (UV-C) (Europa series)

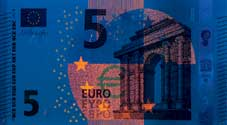
Obverse

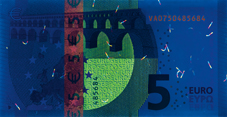
Reverse

5 euro banknote under infrared light (Europa series)

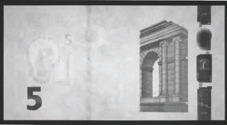
Obverse

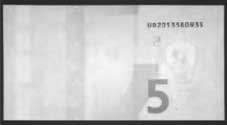
Reverse

The five-euro note is the smallest at 120 by 62 millimetres (4.7 in × 2.4 in) with a grey colour scheme. All bank notes depict bridges, arches or doorways in a different historical European style; the five euro note shows the Classical era (8th century BC–4th century AD). Although Robert Kalina's original designs were intended to show real monuments, for political reasons the bridge and art are merely hypothetical examples of the architectural era.

Like all euro notes, it contains the denomination, the EU flag, the signature of the president of the ECB and the initials of said bank in different EU languages, a map of Europe, a depiction of EU territories overseas, the stars from the EU flag and twelve security features as listed below.

=== Security features (first series) ===
As a lower-value note, the security features of the five-euro note are not as high as the other denominations; however, it is protected by:

- A hologram, tilt the note and one should see the hologram image change between the value and a window or doorway, but in the background, one should see rainbow-coloured concentric circles of micro-letters moving from the centre to the edges of the patch.
- A EURion constellation, special printing processes give the euro notes their unique feel.
- A glossy stripe, tilt the note and a glossy stripe showing the value numeral and the euro symbol will appear.
- Watermarks, it appears when the banknote is against the light.
- Raised printing, special methods of printing makes the ink feel raised or thicker in the main image, the lettering and the value numerals on the front of the banknotes. To feel the raised print, run your finger over it or scratch it gently with your fingernail.
- Ultraviolet ink, Under ultraviolet light, the paper itself should not glow, fibres embedded in the paper should appear, and should be coloured red, blue and green, the European Union flag looks green and has orange stars, the ECB President signature turns green, the large stars and small circles on the front glow and the European map, a bridge and the value numeral on the back appear in yellow.
- Microprinting, On numerous areas of the banknotes you can see microprinting, for example, inside the "ΕΥΡΩ" (EURO in Greek characters) on the front. You will need a magnifying glass to see it. The tiny text is sharp, and not blurred.
- A security thread, The security thread is embedded in the banknote paper. Hold the banknote against the light - the thread will appear as a dark stripe. The word "EURO" and the value can be seen in tiny letters on the stripe.
- Perforations, Hold the banknote against the light. You should see perforations in the hologram which will form the € symbol. You should also see small numbers showing the value.
- A matted surface, the note paper is made out of pure cotton, which feels crisp and firm, but not limp or waxy.
- Barcodes,
- A serial number.

=== Security features (Europa series) ===
Microprinting on the 5 euro note of the Europa series

- Watermark: When the note is held under a normal light source, a portrait of Europa and an electrotype denomination appear on either side.
- Portrait Hologram: When the note is tilted, the silver-coloured holographic stripe reveals the portrait of Europa-the same one as in the watermark. The stripe also reveals a window and the value of the banknote.
- Emerald Number: When the note is tilted, the number on the note displays an effect of light that moves up and down. The number also changes colour from emerald green to deep blue.
- Raised Printing: On the front of the note, there is a series of short raised lines on the left and right edges. The main edge, the lettering and the large value numeral also feel thicker.
- Security Thread: When the note is held against the light, the security thread appears as a dark line. The Euro symbol (€) and the value of the banknote can be seen in tiny white lettering in the thread.
- Microprint: Tiny letters which can be read with a magnifying glass. The letters should be sharp, not blurred.
- Ultraviolet ink: Some parts of the banknote shine when under UV or UV-C light. These are the stars in the flag, the small circles, the large stars and several other areas on the front. On the back, a quarter of a circle in the centre as well as several other areas glow green. The horizontal serial number and a stripe appear in red.
- Infrared light: Under infrared light, the emerald number, the right side of the main image and the silvery stripe are visible on the obverse of the banknote, while on the reverse, only the denomination and the horizontal serial number are visible.

== Circulation ==
The European Central Bank is closely monitoring the circulation and stock of the euro coins and banknotes. It is a task of the Eurosystem to ensure an efficient and smooth supply of euro notes and to maintain their integrity throughout the euro area.

In December 2025, there were 2,330,313,759 €5 banknotes in circulation around the Eurozone. for €11,651,568,795.

This is a net number, i.e., the number of banknotes issued by the Eurosystem central banks, without further distinction as to who is holding the currency issued, thus also including the stocks held by credit institutions.

Besides the date of the introduction of the first set to January 2002, the publication of figures is more significant through the maximum number of banknotes raised each year. The number is higher at the end of the year, except for this note in 2002.

The figures are as follows (3 November 2017):

Date	Banknotes	€ Value	Date	Banknotes	€ Value
January 2002	1,919,890,327	9,599,451,635	December 2008	1,475,610,499	7,378,052,495
December 2003	1,218,288,843	6,091,444,215	December 2009	1,497,585,692	7,487,928,460
December 2004	1,246,528,720	6,232,643,600	December 2010	1,522,271,959	7,611,359,795
December 2005	1,284,662,576	6,423,312,880	December 2011	1,545,677,368	7,728,386,840
December 2006	1,345,643,994	6,728,219,970	December 2012	1,613,104,679	8,065,523,395
December 2007	1,421,089,850	7,105,449,250			

In May 2013, a new 'Europe' series was issued.

The first series of notes were issued in conjunction with those for a few weeks in the series 'Europe' until existing stocks are exhausted, then gradually withdrawn from circulation. Both series thus run parallel but the proportion tends inevitably to a sharp decrease in the first series.

Date	Banknotes	€ Value	Series '1' remainder	€ Value	Proportion
December 2013	1,672,391,858	8,361,959,290	829,305,109	4,146,525,545	49.6%
December 2014	1,715,872,011	8,579,360,055	500,770,403	2,503,852,015	29.2%
December 2015	1,766,164,560	8,830,822,800	397,807,951	1,989,039,755	22.5%
December 2016	1,805,152,448	9,025,762,240	342,245,848	1,711,229,240	19.0%
December 2017	1,863,194,983	9,315,974,915	311,560,798	1,557,803,990	16.7%
December 2018	1,935,901,993	9,679,509,965	292,374,602	1,461,873,010	15.1%
December 2019	1,988,757,004	9,943,785,020	278,152,931	1,390,764,655	14.0%
December 2020	1,989,596,386	9,947,981,930	267,275,834	1,336,379,170	13.4%
December 2021	2,042,748,557	10,213,742,785	266,983,450	1,334,917,250	13.1%
December 2022	2,123,904,445	10,619,522,225	259,150,725	1,295,753,625	12.2%
December 2023	2,195,496,104	10,977,480,520	252,019,216	1,260,096,080	11.5%
December 2024	2,264,885,818	11,324,429,090	246,057,753	1,230,288,765	10.9%
December 2025	2,330,313,759	11,651,568,795	240,675,884	1,203,379,420	10.3%

The latest figures provided by the ECB are the following:

Date	Banknotes	€ Value	Series '1' remainder	€ Value	Proportion
April 2026	2,325,559,164	11,627,795,820	239,087,205	1,195,436,025	10.3%

== Legal information ==
Legally, both the European Central Bank and the central banks of the eurozone countries have the right to issue the seven different euro banknotes. In practice, only the national central banks of the zone physically issue and withdraw euro banknotes. The European Central Bank does not have a cash office and is not involved in any cash operations.

== Tracking ==
There are several communities of people at European level, most of which is EuroBillTracker, that, as a hobby, it keeps track of the euro banknotes that pass through their hands, to keep track and know where they travel or have travelled. The aim is to record as many notes as possible to know details about its spread, like from where and to where they travel in general, follow it up, like where a ticket has been seen in particular, and generate statistics and rankings, for example, in which countries there are more tickets. EuroBillTracker has registered over 155 million notes as of May 2016, worth more than €2.897 billion.
