= Vision for Europe Award =

The Vision for Europe Award is an honour that has been bestowed annually since 1995 by the non-profit Edmond Israel Foundation in "recognition of outstanding achievements in taking Europe into the future."

Between 1995 and 2008, the award was presented to the recipient in a ceremony at the Edmond Israel Foundation building in Luxembourg City. Luxembourg's best-known sculptor Lucien Wercollier designed the statue presented to the recipients. The first Vision for Europe Award was given to Jacques Santer in 1995, the year he left his position as Prime Minister of Luxembourg to become President of the European Commission. The award honored his efforts to unite Europe into a single entity.

Since 2016, the Award is presented during the Prague European Summit. The statue is produced by the Czech glass manufacturer Preciosa.

== Recipients ==
Year	Image	Choice	Notes
1995		Jacques Santer	at the time President of the European Commission and former Prime Minister of Luxembourg
1996		Jean-Luc Dehaene	Prime Minister of Belgium
1997		Helmut Kohl	Chancellor of Germany
1998		Jean-Claude Juncker	Prime Minister of Luxembourg
1999		Wim Duisenberg	first president of the European Central Bank and formerly Minister of Finance for the Netherlands
2000		Árpád Göncz	President of Hungary
2001	Not awarded		
2002		Guy Verhofstadt	Prime Minister of Belgium
2003		Javier Solana	High Representative for the Common Foreign and Security Policy (CFSP) and the Secretary-General of both the Council of the European Union (EU) and the Western European Union (WEU) and former Secretary General of NATO.
2004	Not awarded		
2005	Not awarded		
2006		Angela Merkel	Chancellor of Germany
2007	Not awarded		
2008		Jean-Claude Trichet	President of the European Central Bank and former governor of the Banque de France
2016		Wolfgang Wessels	Professor & Jean Monnet Chair, University of Cologne.
2017		Timothy Garton Ash	Historian and professor of European Studies at Oxford University
2018		Emily O'Reilly	European Ombudsman
2019		Mikuláš Dzurinda	Former Prime Minister and Minister of Foreign Affairs of Slovakia, President of the Wilfried Martens Centre for European Studies
2020		Margot Wallström	Former First Vice-President of the European Commission and Deputy Prime Minister of Sweden
2020		Federica Mogherini	Former High Representative of the European Union for Foreign Affairs and Security Policy and Vice-President of the European Commission
2021		Borut Pahor	President of Slovenia
2022		Karel Schwarzenberg	Former Minister of Foreign Affairs of the Czech Republic
2023		Věra Jourová	Vice President of the European Commission for Values and Transparency
