= Émile Moreau (banker) =

French banker (1868–1950)

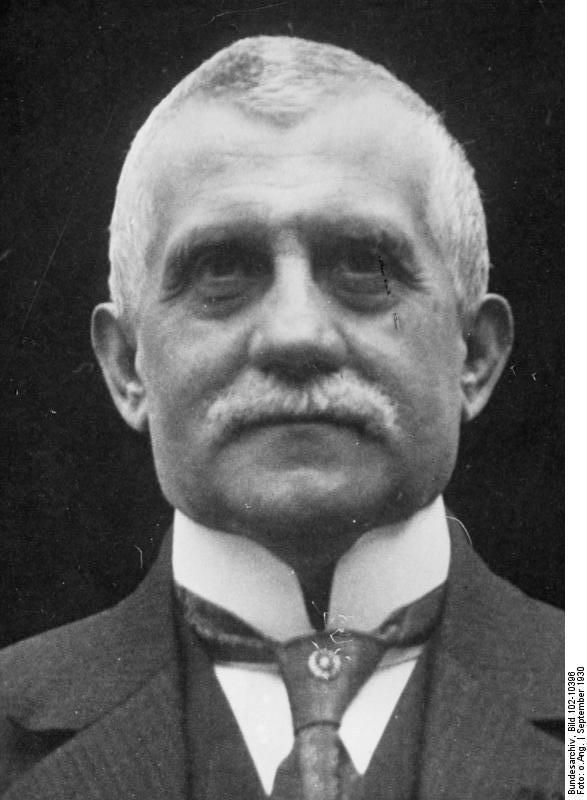
- Governor of the Banque de France, 1926-1930

Governor of the Bank of France
- In office 1926–1930
- Preceding: Georges Robineau
- Preceded by: Clément Moret

Personal details
- Born: 29 September 1868 Poitiers, France
- Died: November 9, 1950 (aged 82) Paris, France

Émile Moreau (29 September 1868 – 9 November 1950) was a French banker who served as Governor of the Bank of France from 1926 to 1930 and chairman of Paribas from 1931 to 1940. After retiring from his role as governor he took a job in a private bank. His contribution to the Poincare Stabilization helped the French Franc to gain credibility in the 1920s following the Russian Default post the Bolshevik Revolution. As pointed out in his memoirs, Emile Moreau took active measures to increase French influence in Eastern Europe. It was under his governorship that French Money Doctors were sent to Romania as advisors.

== Finance Ministry ==
In 1902, French Finance Minister Maurice Rouvier chose Moreau as his chef de cabinet. He served numerous positions within the French civil service, including was Inspector General of Finance in 1896, Chief of Staff of the Minister of Finance in 1902, and Director General of the Banque de l'Algérie. While at the Ministry of Finance, he presided over an international community that would oversee the repayment of debts from the First World War.

== Banque de France ==
Moreau was the Governor of the Banque de France from 1926 to 1930. The preceding years were marked by hyperinflation in Germany and contention over the German reparation issue. As such, he led efforts at the Bank for the stabilization of the Poincaré franc in 1926 and was an avid supporter of de facto devaluation. This involved a negotiation with several international banking firms for a loan that would allow the Bank to defend the franc from severe exchange-rate fluctuations. Moreau also advocated the accumulation of gold reserves in the years leading up to the Great Depression, as well as create a stabilization fund (fonds de stabilisation). He sought to establish the Banque de France as an international leader in monetary policy, comparable to the likes of the Bank of England and the Reichsbank.

Moreau retired in 1930 and was succeeded by Clément Moret. In 1935 he became the chairman of the State Bank of Morocco.
