= Trichet-Draghi letter =

Correspondence

The Trichet-Draghi letter, also known as the letter of ECB to Italy, is a confidential correspondence by which, on 5 August 2011, the former and current ECB presidents Jean-Claude Trichet and Mario Draghi (outgoing Governor of the Bank of Italy) addressed to Italian government several requests in order to influence European support to drastic measures of economic rebalancing.

== Background ==
Despite the approval of economical measures proposed by the Italian government (with Legge 30 luglio 2010, n. 122 and with Legge 15 luglio 2011 n. 111), on 4 August 2011, the spread of decennial btp-bund reached 389 points.

== Historical context ==
On 5 August 2011, during the dramatic crisis of European banks, the former governor of ECB, Jean Claude Trichet, together with Mario Draghi, wrote a "secret" letter to the Italian government, at the time led by Silvio Berlusconi. In the letter, they pushed for a series of economic measures "to be implemented as soon as possible". By complying with these measures, the support of the ECB was implicitly conditioned by the massive purchase of Italian bonds on the secondary market.

This initiative represented an absolute novelty and, for several commentators, strong interference in the internal affairs of a sovereign country.

== Requested measures ==
The letter specified the measures considered urgent in order to avoid the collapse of the country and of Euro. Listed points were:

- 1. Significant measures in order to increase the growth potential;
- 2. Immediate and decided measures to ensure the sustainability of public finances;
  - 2.a Further measures of balance revision;
  - 2.b Clause of automatic deficit reduction;
  - 2.c Strict control on debt assumption, even commercial, and expenses of regional and local authorities.

== Publication of the letter ==
On 5 August 2011, the same day of the letter, with closed markets, Berlusconi and Tremonti summoned a press conference to explain an extraordinary maneuver for Italy. After this conference, the press began to talk about a "secret letter" of ECB sent to the Italian government.

Andrea D'Ambra, president of Generazione attiva association, asked to ECB to see that letter, but on 7 September 2011 ECB answered that "the letter must remain secret":

[...] Abbiamo deciso di non fornire accesso al documento richiesto, poiché la divulgazione recherebbe pregiudizio alla tutela dell'interesse pubblico. Nella fattispecie la Banca europea ritiene che la divulgazione recherebbe pregiudizio all'efficacia dei messaggi della stessa Bce ai governi degli stati membri, in quanto strumento atto a promuovere un contesto favorevole al ripristino della fiducia degli investitori dei mercati finanziari, elemento di primaria importanza ai fini di una fluida conduzione della politica monetaria.[...]

— Secretariat manager of ECB
Translation:

[...] We decided to not provide access to the requested document, because its disclosure would affect the safeguard of public interest. In the present case, the ECB considers that the disclosure would harm to the efficiency of the messages of ECB itself to the other governments of the member states, since instrument aimed to promote a favorable context for restoring of investor confidence of financial markets, element of primary importance for a fluid conduction of monetary policy. [...]

On 29 September 2011, a scoop of Corriere della Sera reveals this letter to public opinion.

== Consequences ==
The Italian government during August proposed further economical measures that Parliament approved in almost one month with Legge 14 settembre 2011 n. 148 (Conversione in legge, con modificazioni, del decreto-legge 13 agosto 2011, n. 138, recante ulteriori misure urgenti per la stabilizzazione finanziaria).

Nevertheless, in a political confrontation between Berlusconi, Angela Merkel and Nicolas Sarkozy on 22 October 2011, these measures were considered insufficient, in a meeting that was "defined in the following days as tense and extremely hard towards the government of Rome by Valentino Valentini, the personal adviser in international relationship of Italian Prime Minister. Merkel and Sarkozy, which evidently did not tolerate excuses about current difficult situation of Italy, pushed on Prime Minister, so that he announced strong and concrete measures, and to apply in order to demonstrate that his government is serious about debt problem."

=== Conspiracy theory ===
The NSA's illegal interceptions of collaborators of the Italian Prime Minister were highlighted by his party to denounce US interference and to seek confirmation of a conspiracy theory stemming from these events. According to this theory, the press conference held the following day, during which the leaders of Germany and France exchanged a wry smile before expressing trust in the responsibility of Italian political, economic, and financial institutions, triggered the President of the Italian Republic, Giorgio Napolitano. Allegedly, on October 26, 2011, Napolitano refused to sign a decree containing additional economic measures that would have strengthened the Italian government's position amidst financial market turmoil and an EU meeting in Nice.

Proponents of this conspiracy theory not only entertain this notion but also entertain other concurrent conspiratorial narratives to rationalize Berlusconi's resignation on November 12, 2011.
