= Ernest Denormandie =

French politician

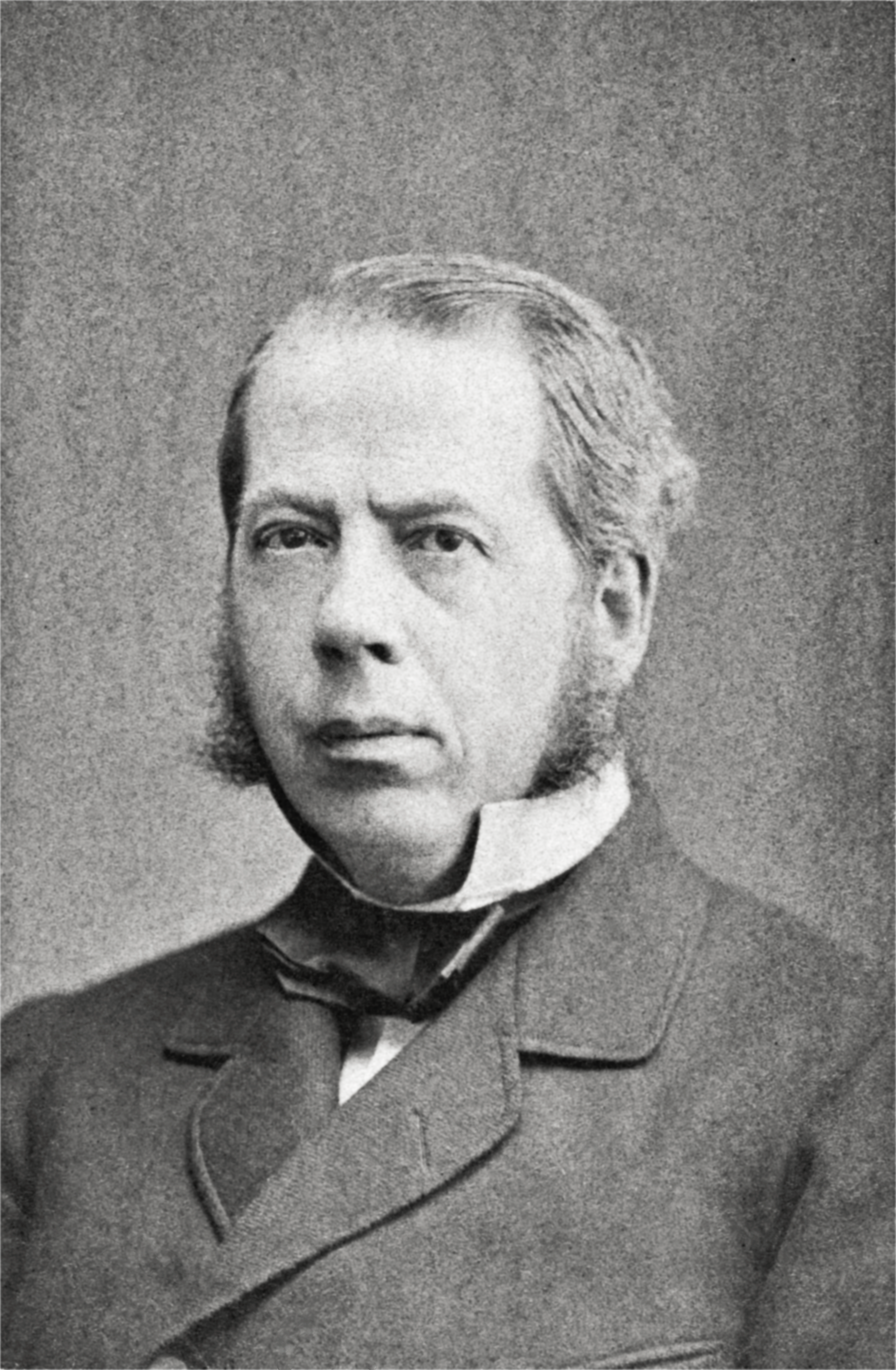
Ernest Denormandie

Louis Jules Ernest Denormandie (6 August 1821 – 28 January 1902) was a French politician. He was a senator for life from 1876 until his death in 1902.

He was Governor of the Bank of France from 1879 until 1881.
