= Christian Noyer =

French economist (born 1950)

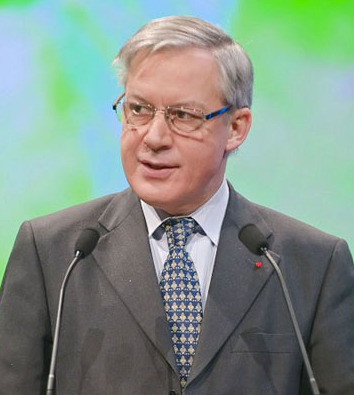
- Noyer in 2008

Chair of the Bank for International Settlements
- In office March 2010 – October 2015
- General Manager: Jaime Caruana
- Preceded by: Guillermo Ortiz Martínez
- Succeeded by: Jens Weidmann

Governor of the Bank of France
- In office 1 November 2003 – 31 October 2015
- Preceded by: Jean-Claude Trichet
- Succeeded by: François Villeroy de Galhau

Vice-President of the European Central Bank
- In office 1 June 1998 – 31 May 2002
- President: Wim Duisenberg
- Preceded by: Position established
- Succeeded by: Lucas Papademos

Personal details
- Born: Christian Maurice Marie Noyer; 6 October 1950 (age 76) Soisy-sous-Montmorency, France
- Party: Rally for the Republic (before 2002); Union for a Popular Movement (2002–2015)
- Education: Paris Descartes University; Sciences Po; École nationale d'administration

Christian Maurice Marie Noyer (French: [kʁistjɑ̃ nwaje]; born 6 October 1950) is a French economist who served as Governor of the Bank of France from 2003 to 2015. In this capacity, he chaired the Bank for International Settlements from 2010 until 2015. He had previously served as vice-president of the European Central Bank (ECB) from 1998 to 2002.

== Career ==
Appointed to the Treasury in the Ministry of the Economy and Finance in 1976, Noyer subsequently spent two years in Brussels from 1980 to 1982 at France's permanent representation to the European Communities. Back at the Treasury, he held a range of posts dealing with both domestic issues (government cash and debt management, banking affairs, financing of industry and state-owned enterprises) and international affairs (multilateral issues, export financing). He was director of the Treasury from 1993 to 1995, when he became chief of staff to Finance Minister Jean Arthuis, a position he held until 1997. He was the first vice-president of the European Central Bank from 1998 to 2002.

Noyer was appointed Governor of the Bank of France in 2003 by then-President Jacques Chirac and confirmed for a second term by his successor, Nicolas Sarkozy. During his tenure as Governor, he was also Chairman of the Autorité de contrôle prudentiel et de résolution (ACPR, the French Prudential Supervision and Resolution Authority for banks and insurance). He also chaired the supervisory boards of the Institut d'Émission des Départements d'Outre-Mer (IEDOM) and the Institut d'Émission d'Outre-Mer (IEOM), the French overseas note-issuing central banks.

== Later career ==
In 2014, the daily newspaper Le Monde reported that Noyer had been considered to succeed Baudouin Prot as chairman of private bank BNP Paribas; the post instead went to Jean Lemierre.

In 2016, Noyer was appointed by Minister of the Economy, Finance and Recovery Bruno Le Maire to lead a task force mandated with leading efforts to attract business from London in the wake of Brexit. He also led France's successful bid to relocate the European Banking Authority to Paris in 2017. In 2022, Le Maire extended Noyer's mission until 2024.

In 2018, the French Treasury asked Noyer to study all possible options to reorganise Crédit Mutuel Arkéa, part of France's fifth-biggest lender, Groupe Crédit Mutuel.

In 2025, Noyer and Jörg Kukies were appointed by France's Minister of the Economy, Finance and Recovery Éric Lombard and Germany's Minister of Finance Lars Klingbeil to co-chair a French-German Taskforce on Financing Innovative Ventures in Europe.

== Other activities ==
=== International organisations ===
- International Monetary Fund (IMF), Ex-Officio Alternate Member of the Board of Governors (1993–1995, 2003–2015)
- Financial Stability Board (FSB), Ex-Officio Member (2008–2015)
- World Bank, Ex-Officio Alternate Member of the Board of Governors (1993–1995)

=== Corporate boards ===
- BNP Paribas, Member of the Board of Directors (since 2021)
- Power Corporation of Canada, Member of the Board of Directors (since 2016)

=== Non-profit organisations ===
- Group of Thirty, Member
- French Institute of International Relations (IFRI), Member of the Board of Directors
- Club de l'horloge, Member (1974–75).

== Honours ==
- Commander of the Legion of Honour (2012)
- Knight of the Ordre national du Mérite (1994)

Government offices
New office	Vice-President of the European Central Bank; 1998–2002	Succeeded by Lucas Papademos
Preceded by Jean-Claude Trichet	Governor of the Bank of France; 2003–2015	Succeeded by François Villeroy de Galhau
Diplomatic posts
Preceded by Guillermo Ortiz Martínez	Chair of the Bank for International Settlements; 2010–2015	Succeeded by Jens Weidmann
