= President of the European Central Bank =

Head of the European Central Bank

- Emblem of the European Central Bank

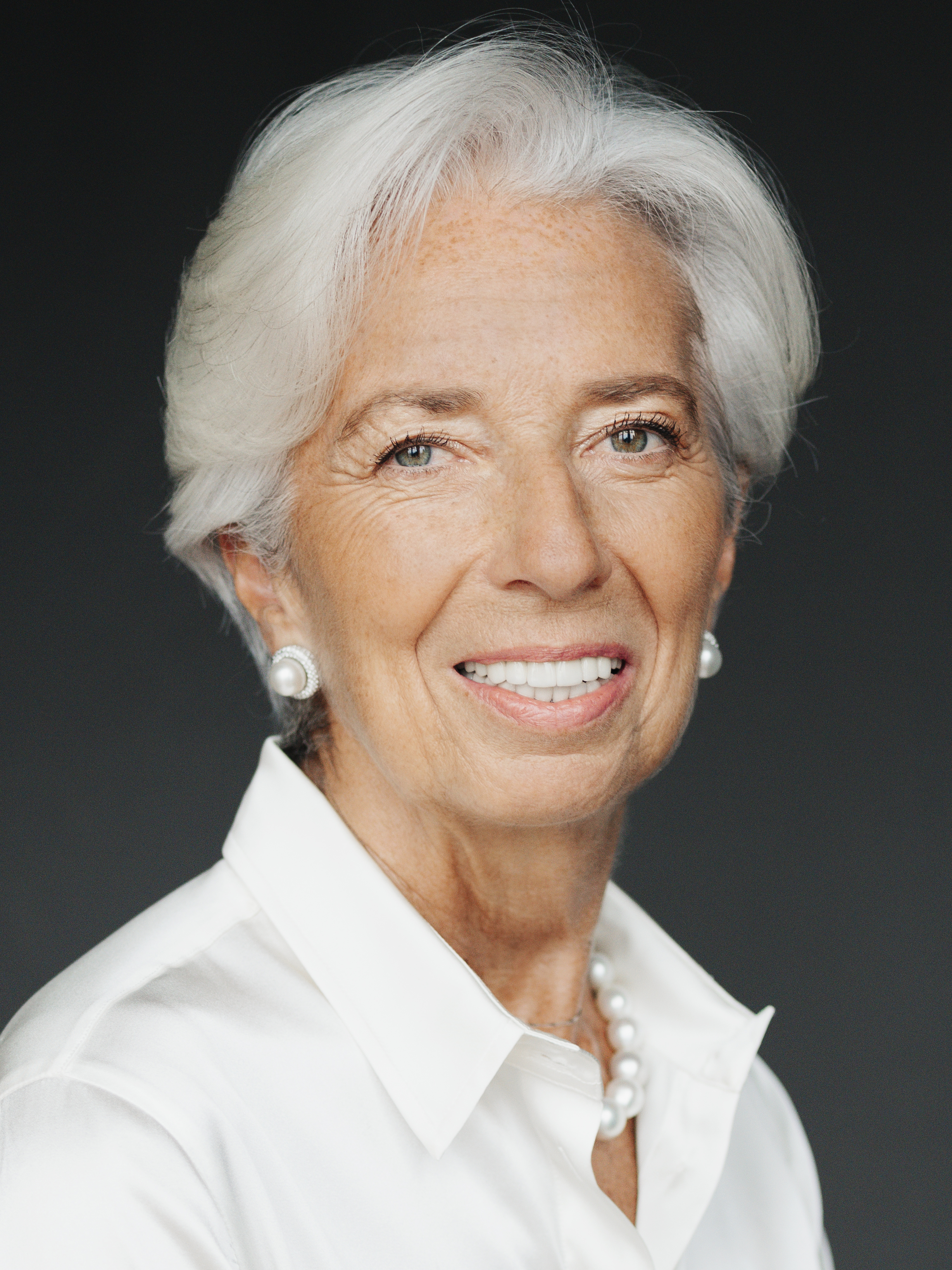
- Incumbent; Christine Lagarde since 1 November 2019
- European Central Bank
- Style: Madam President (ordinary); Her Excellency (diplomatic)
- Member of: Executive Board; Governing Council; General Council
- Reports to: European Parliament; European Council; Eurogroup
- Residence: Seat of the European Central Bank
- Seat: Frankfurt, Germany
- Appointer: European Council
- Term length: Eight years, non renewable
- Constituting instrument: Treaties of the European Union
- Precursor: President of the European Monetary Institute; Euro area national central banks governors
- Formation: 1 June 1998; 28 years ago
- First holder: Wim Duisenberg
- Deputy: Vice-President
- Salary: €421,308 per annum
- Website: ecb.europa.eu

The president of the European Central Bank is the head of the European Central Bank (ECB), the main institution responsible for the management of the euro and monetary policy in the eurozone of the European Union (EU).

The current president of the European Central Bank is Christine Lagarde, previously the chair and managing director of the International Monetary Fund.

== Role and appointment ==
The president heads the executive board, Governing Council and General Council of the ECB, and represents the bank abroad, for example at the G20. The officeholder is appointed by a qualified majority vote of the European Council, de facto by those who have adopted the euro, for an eight-year non-renewable term.

== History ==
=== Duisenberg ===
Wim Duisenberg was President of the European Monetary Institute (EMI) when it became the ECB, just prior to the launch of the Euro, on 1 June 1998. Duisenberg then became the first President of the ECB.

The French interpretation of the agreement made with the installation of Wim Duisenberg as ECB President was that Duisenberg would resign after just four years of his eight-year term, and would be replaced by the Frenchman Jean-Claude Trichet. Duisenberg always strongly denied that such an agreement was made and stated in February 2002 that he would stay in office until his 68th birthday on 9 July 2003.

In the meanwhile Jean-Claude Trichet was not cleared of legal accusations before 1 June 2002, so he was not able to begin his term after Duisenberg's first four years. Even on 9 July 2003 Trichet was not cleared, and therefore Duisenberg remained in office until 1 November 2003. Duisenberg died on 31 July 2005.

=== Trichet ===
Jean-Claude Trichet became president in 2003 and served during the European sovereign debt crisis. Trichet's strengths lay in keeping consensus and visible calm in the ECB. During his tenure, Trichet has had to fend off criticism from French President Nicolas Sarkozy who demanded a more growth-orientated policy at the ECB. Germany Chancellor Angela Merkel supported Trichet in demanding the bank's independence be respected.

However, he was also criticised from straying from his mandate during the crisis by buying the government bonds of eurozone member states. ECB board members Axel A. Weber and Jürgen Stark resigned in protest at this policy, even if it helped prevent states from defaulting. IMF economist Pau Rabanal argued that Trichet "maintained a relatively expansionary monetary policy," but even "sacrificed the ECB's inflation target for the sake of greater economic growth and jobs creation, and not the other way round." While straying from his mandate, he has however still kept interest rates under control and maintained greater price stability than the Deutsche Bundesbank did before the euro.

As well as defending the ECB's independence and balancing its commitment to interest rates and economic stability, Trichet also fought Sarkozy for automatic sanctions in the EU fiscal reforms and opposite Merkel's against private sector involvement in bail outs so as not to scare the markets. He had however made some mistakes during the crisis, for example by: raising interest rates just after inflation topped out and just prior to the recession triggered by the Lehman Brothers collapse; also by its early timidity in buying eurozone state bonds.

In his final appearance (his 35th) before the European Parliament, Trichet called for more political unity, including; significant new powers to be granted to the ECB, the establishment of an executive branch with a European Finance Ministry and greater oversight powers for the European Parliament. He also asserted that the ECB's role in maintaining price stability throughout the financial crisis and the oil price rises should not be overlooked. He stated, in response to a question from a German newspaper attacking the ECB's credibility following its bond-buying;

...first, we were called to deliver price stability! ... We have delivered price stability over the first 12–13 years of the euro! Impeccably! I would like very much to hear some congratulations for this institution, which has delivered price stability in Germany over almost 13 years at approximately 1.55% - as the yearly average of inflation - we will recalculate the figure to the second decimal. This figure is better than any ever obtained in this country over a period of 13 years in the past 50 years. So, my first remark is this: we have a mandate and we deliver on our mandate! And we deliver in a way that is not only numerically convincing, but which is better than anything achieved in the past.

— Jean Claude Trichet at the European Parliament, 8 September 2011

=== Draghi ===
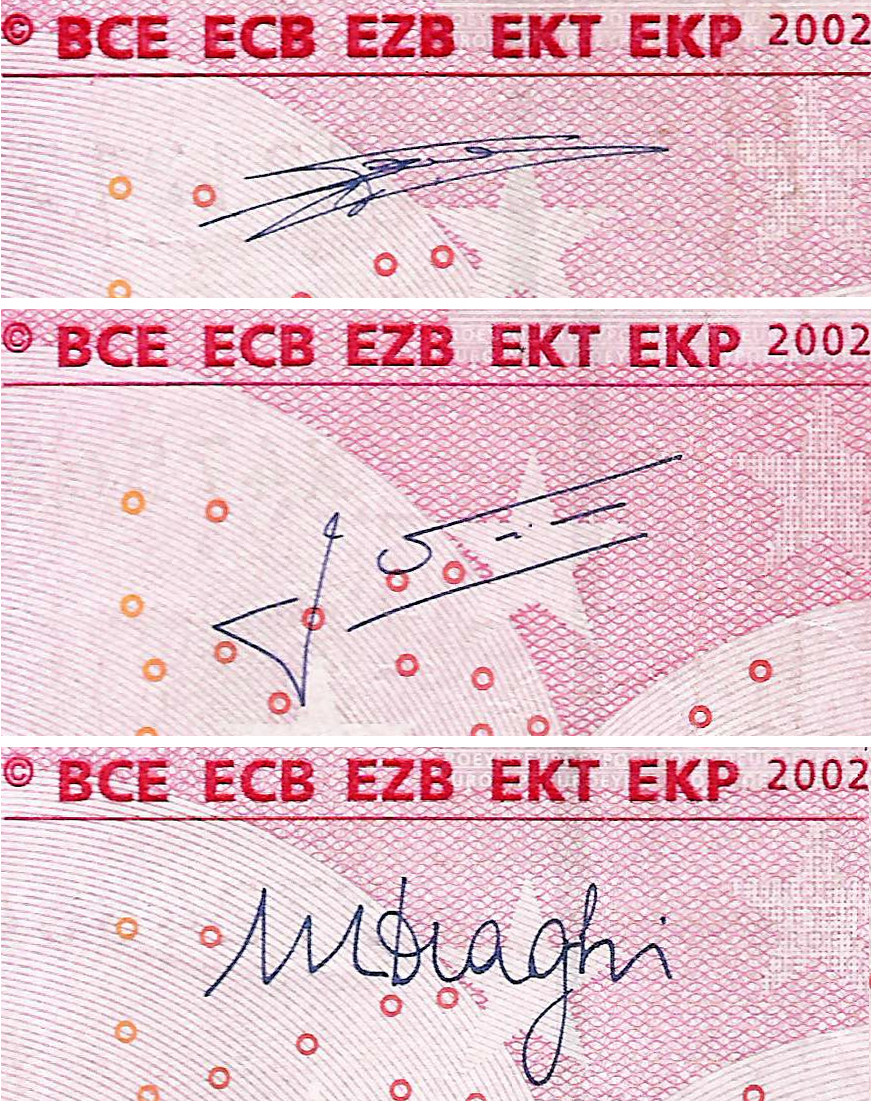
Signatures of Duisenberg, Trichet and Draghi on euro banknotes

Although Axel Weber was tipped as one of the possible successors, he resigned from the ECB in protest at the bail out policies. Mario Draghi was chosen to become the next President of the ECB on 24 June 2011. Draghi was president from 1 November 2011 until 31 October 2019 (succeeded by Christine Lagarde).

Pascal Canfin, Member of the European Parliament for France, asserted that Draghi had been involved in swaps for European governments, namely Greece, trying to disguise their countries' economic status. Draghi responded that the deals were "undertaken before my joining Goldman Sachs [and] I had nothing to do with" them, in the 2011 European Parliament nomination hearings.

In December 2011, Draghi oversaw a €489 billion ($640 billion), three-year loan program from the ECB to European banks. The program was around the same size as the US Troubled Asset Relief Program (2008) though still much smaller than the overall US response including the Federal Reserve's asset purchases and other actions of that time.

In February, 2012, a second, somewhat larger round of ECB loans to European banks was initiated under Draghi, called long term refinancing operation (LTRO). One commentator, Matthew Lynn, saw the ECB's injection of funds, along with Quantitative easing from the US Fed and the Asset Purchase Facility at the Bank of England, as feeding increases in oil prices in 2011 and 2012.

In July 2012, in the midst of renewed fears about sovereigns in the eurozone, Draghi stated in a panel discussion that the ECB "...is ready to do whatever it takes to preserve the Euro. And believe me, it will be enough." This statement led to a steady decline in bond yields (borrowing costs) for eurozone countries, in particular Spain, Italy and France. In light of slow political progress on solving the eurozone crisis, Draghi's statement has been seen as a key turning point in the fortunes of the Eurozone.

=== Lagarde ===
Christine Lagarde has served as the president of the ECB since 1 November 2019. She is the first woman to hold the post.

== List ==
=== Presidents ===
N.	Portrait	President (Born–Died)	State	Took office	Left office	Professional background
1		Wim Duisenberg (1935–2005)	Netherlands	1 June 1998	31 October 2003	Background: Minister of Finance of the Netherlands; President of De Nederlandsche Bank; President of the European Monetary Institute, immediate ECB predecessor
1		Wim Duisenberg (1935–2005)	Netherlands	5 years, 153 days		Background: Minister of Finance of the Netherlands; President of De Nederlandsche Bank; President of the European Monetary Institute, immediate ECB predecessor
2		Jean-Claude Trichet (born 1942)	France	1 November 2003	31 October 2011	Background: General Director of the Treasury at the Ministry of Finance; Governor of the Bank of France
2		Jean-Claude Trichet (born 1942)	France	8 years		Background: General Director of the Treasury at the Ministry of Finance; Governor of the Bank of France
3		Mario Draghi (born 1947)	Italy	1 November 2011	31 October 2019	Background: Managing director of Goldman Sachs; Executive Director of the World Bank; Chairman of the Financial Stability Board; Governor of the Bank of Italy
3		Mario Draghi (born 1947)	Italy	8 years		Background: Managing director of Goldman Sachs; Executive Director of the World Bank; Chairman of the Financial Stability Board; Governor of the Bank of Italy
4		Christine Lagarde (born 1956)	France	1 November 2019	Incumbent	Background: Minister of Commerce; Minister of Economy, Finance and Industry of France; Managing Director of the International Monetary Fund
4		Christine Lagarde (born 1956)	France	6 years, 311 days		Background: Minister of Commerce; Minister of Economy, Finance and Industry of France; Managing Director of the International Monetary Fund

=== Vice presidents ===
N.	Portrait	Vice President (Born–Died)	State	Took office	Left office	Professional background
1		Christian Noyer (born 1950)	France	1 June 1998	31 May 2002 (Note: Noyer was only Vice President appointed for four years so that his resignation would coincide with the expected resignation of President Duisenberg.)	Background: A civil servant, advisor and Chief of Staff of the Minister of Economy and Finance; General Director of the Treasury at the Ministry of Finance of France
1		Christian Noyer (born 1950)	France	4 years		Background: A civil servant, advisor and Chief of Staff of the Minister of Economy and Finance; General Director of the Treasury at the Ministry of Finance of France
2		Lucas Papademos (born 1947)	Greece	1 June 2002	31 May 2010	Background: Senior Economist at the Federal Reserve Bank of Boston; Chief Economist and then Governor of the Bank of Greece
2		Lucas Papademos (born 1947)	Greece	8 years		Background: Senior Economist at the Federal Reserve Bank of Boston; Chief Economist and then Governor of the Bank of Greece
3		Vítor Constâncio (born 1943)	Portugal	1 June 2010	31 May 2018	Background: Minister of Finance; Secretary-general of the Socialist Party; Governor of the Bank of Portugal
3		Vítor Constâncio (born 1943)	Portugal	8 years		Background: Minister of Finance; Secretary-general of the Socialist Party; Governor of the Bank of Portugal
4		Luis de Guindos (born 1960)	Spain	1 June 2018	31 May 2026	Background: Minister of Economy; Minister of Industry; Secretary of State for Economy, Energy and Business
4		Luis de Guindos (born 1960)	Spain	8 years		Background: Minister of Economy; Minister of Industry; Secretary of State for Economy, Energy and Business
5		Boris Vujčić (born 1964)	Croatia	1 June 2026	Incumbent	Background: Governor of the Croatian National Bank
5		Boris Vujčić (born 1964)	Croatia	99 days		Background: Governor of the Croatian National Bank
