= European Monetary Institute =

Forerunner of the European Central Bank

The European Monetary Institute (EMI) was the forerunner of the European Central Bank (ECB), operating between 1994 and 1998.

== History ==
The EMI was created 1 January 1994 to oversee the second stage in the creation of monetary union. The EMI itself replaced the earlier European Monetary Cooperation Fund (EMCF). The EMI met for the first time on 12 January under its first President, Alexandre Lamfalussy. On 1 July 1997 Lamfalussy was replaced by Wim Duisenberg who later became the ECB's President. The institute was dissolved on 1 June 1998 with the creation of the ECB and the European System of Central Banks (ESCB) which took over its expanded responsibilities in preparation for the euro's introduction.

== Role ==
The EMI was the key monetary institution of the second phase of the Economic and Monetary Union of the European Union. The EMU encouraged cooperation between the national banks of the member states of the European Union (EU) and laid the foundation for the euro. It had less than 250 staff, mostly seconded from national central banks, and was based in the Eurotower, Frankfurt (Germany), where the ECB is now based.

== See also ==
- Delors Committee
- History of the euro
