= Governor of the Bank of France =

Most senior officer of the Bank of France

The Governor of the Bank of France (French: Gouverneur de la Banque de France) is the most senior officer of the Bank of France. The position is currently held by Emmanuel Moulin, who took office on 2 June 2026.

== Duties and responsibilities ==
Assisted by two Deputy Governors and independent with regard to political authorities, the Governor administers the Banque de France in pursuit of its three core missions: monetary strategy, financial stability and services to the economy.

He chairs the General Council, which deliberates on issues concerning the management of activities outside the purview of the Eurosystem.

He also sits on the Governing Council of the European Central Bank, which is responsible for setting Eurosystem monetary policy.

== Associated positions ==
The duties of the Governor of the Banque de France include fulfilling several mandates laid down in the Monetary and Financial Code, including:

- Member of the Governing Council of the European Central Bank
- Chair of the Prudential Supervision and Resolution Authority
- Member of the High Council for Financial Stability
- Chairman of the Observatory for the Security of Payment Means
- Member of the board of directors of the Bank for International Settlements
- Member of the National Financial Education Committee.

== Appointment ==
Since the constitutional revision of 23 July 2008, the Governor of the Banque de France has been appointed by decree of the President of the Republic following consultation with the Finance Committees of the National Assembly and the Senate, which have the power to veto appointments by a three-fifths majority vote.

== List of governors of the Banque de France ==
List of governors of the Banque de France, which is a member of the European Central Bank:

Beginning of tenure		Name	Born-Died	Note
1806	25 April	Emmanuel Crétet	1747–1809	
1807	9 August	François Jaubert	1758–1822	
1814	6 April	Jacques Laffitte	1767–1844	
1820	6 April	Martin-Michel-Charles Gaudin	1756–1841	
1836	25 February	Jean Charles Joachim Davillier	1758–1846	
1836	5 September	Antoine Maurice Apollinaire d'Argout	1782–1858	
1857	9 June	Charles Le Bègue de Germiny	1799–1871	
1863	15 May	Adolphe Vuitry	1813–1885	
1864	28 September	Gustave Rouland	1806–1878	
1879	18 January	Ernest Denormandie	1821–1902	
1881	18 November	Pierre Magnin	1824–1910	
1897	24 December	Georges Pallain	1847–1923	
1920	25 August	Georges Robineau	1860–1927	
1926	26 June	Émile Moreau	1868–1950	
1930	25 September	Clément Moret	1886–1943	
1935	2 January	Jean Tannery	1878–1939	
1936	6 June	Émile Labeyrie	1877–1966	
1937	20 July	Pierre-Eugène Fournier	1882–1972	
1940	31 August	Yves Bréart de Boisanger	1896–1976	
1944	7 October	Emmanuel Monick	1893–1983	
1949	19 January	Wilfrid Baumgartner	1902–1978	
1960	21 January	Jacques Brunet	1901–1990	
1969	8 April	Olivier Wormser	1913–1985	
1974	14 June	Bernard Clappier	1913–1999	
1979	23 November	Renaud de La Genière	1925–1990	
1984	14 November	Michel Camdessus	1933	
1987	19 January	Jacques de Larosière	1929	
1993	September	Jean-Claude Trichet	1942	
2003	1 November	Christian Noyer	1950	
2015	1 November	François Villeroy de Galhau	1959	
2016	2 June	Emmanuel Moulin	1968	
