= Wim Duisenberg =

Dutch politician and economist, first ECB President (1935–2005)

His Excellency Wim Duisenberg
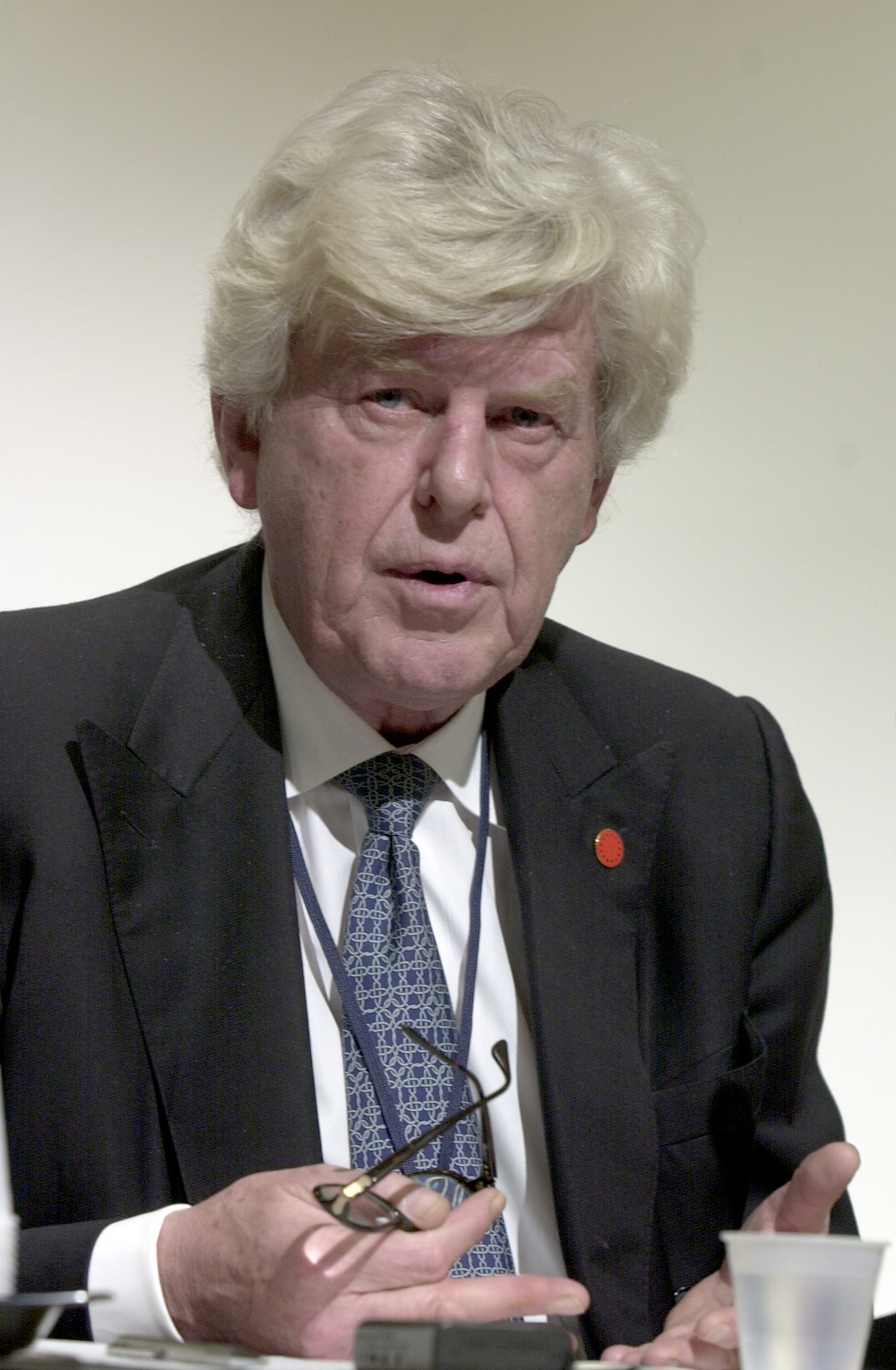
- Duisenberg in 2001

President of the European Central Bank
- In office 1 June 1998 – 31 October 2003
- Vice President: Christian Noyer; Lucas Papademos
- Preceded by: Position established
- Succeeded by: Jean-Claude Trichet

President of the European Monetary Institute
- In office 1 July 1997 – 1 June 1998
- Preceded by: Alexandre Lamfalussy
- Succeeded by: Position abolished

President and Chairman of the Bank for International Settlements
- In office 1 January 1994 – 1 July 1997
- General-Manager: Andrew Crockett
- Preceded by: Bengt Dennis
- Succeeded by: Alfons Verplaetse
- In office 1 January 1988 – 31 December 1990
- General-Manager: Alexandre Lamfalussy
- Preceded by: Jean Godeaux
- Succeeded by: Bengt Dennis

President of De Nederlandsche Bank
- In office 1 January 1982 – 1 July 1997
- Preceded by: Jelle Zijlstra
- Succeeded by: Nout Wellink

Member of the House of Representatives
- In office 16 January 1978 – 28 June 1978
- In office 8 June 1977 – 8 September 1977

Minister of Finance
- In office 11 May 1973 – 19 December 1977
- Prime Minister: Joop den Uyl
- Preceded by: Roelof Nelissen
- Succeeded by: Frans Andriessen

Personal details
- Born: Willem Frederik Duisenberg; 9 July 1935 Heerenveen, Netherlands
- Died: 31 July 2005 (aged 70) Faucon, France
- Cause of death: Drowning
- Party: Labour Party (from 1959)
- Spouses: Tine Stelling (m. 1960; div. 1980) Gretta Nieuwenhuizen (m. 1987)
- Children: 3; including Pieter Duisenberg
- Education: University of Groningen (BEc, M.Econ, PhD)
- Occupation: Politician; civil servant; economist; researcher; businessperson; banker; corporate director; lobbyist; author; professor

Willem Frederik "Wim" Duisenberg (Dutch: [ˈʋɪləɱ ˈfreːdərɪk ʋɪm ˈdœysə(m)bɛr(ə)x]; 9 July 1935 – 31 July 2005) was a Dutch politician, economist and senior official who served as the first President of the European Central Bank from 1998 to 2003. A member of the Labour Party (PvdA), he previously was Minister of Finance from 1973 to 1977 and presided over De Nederlandsche Bank (DNB), the Dutch central bank, from 1982 to 1997.

Duisenberg worked as a financial analyst for the International Monetary Fund (IMF) from January 1966 until March 1969 and as an economist for DNB from March 1969 until February 1970. He then was a professor of Macroeconomics at the University of Amsterdam from February 1970 until May 1973. After the 1972 general election Duisenberg was appointed as Minister of Finance in the centre-left cabinet of Prime Minister Joop den Uyl, taking office on 11 May 1973. The cabinet fell just before the end of its term; following the 1977 general election Duisenberg served in the House of Representatives from 8 June until 8 September 1977 and again from 16 January 1978, where he was a frontbencher and spokesperson for Finance. In June 1978 Duisenberg unexpectedly announced his retirement and resigned from the House of Representatives on 28 June. He semi-retired from active politics at 42 and became active in the private sector as a corporate director, and worked as a banker for Rabobank. In November 1981 Duisenberg was nominated as the next DNB President, taking office on 1 January 1982. In June 1997 he was nominated as the next President of the European Monetary Institute (EMI), taking office on 1 July 1997. In May 1998 the EMI was reformed to the European Central Bank (ECB) with Duisenberg appointed as its inaugural president, serving from 1 June 1998 until 31 October 2003.

Duisenberg retired from active politics a second time at 68 and became active again in the private and public sectors as a corporate and non-profit director and served on several state commissions and councils on behalf of the government. Following his retirement Duisenberg continued to be active as an advocate and lobbyist for balanced governmental budgets, financial regulation and more European integration. Duisenberg was known for his abilities as a skillful manager and effective negotiator and continued to comment on political affairs until his death after suffering a heart attack and drowning in a swimming pool in July 2005 at the age of 70. He holds the distinction as the youngest-serving Dutch Minister of Finance at the age of 37 years, 306 days.

== Early life and education ==
Willem Frederik Duisenberg was born on 9 July 1935 in the Frisian city of Heerenveen in the Netherlands. He was the son of Lammert Duisenberg, who was a waterworks supervisor, and Antje Ykema. He went to a public primary school in his hometown. He went to secondary school, first one year of Hogere Burgerschool and then gymnasium with natural sciences, also in Heerenveen. In 1954, Duisenberg moved to Haren. He studied at the University of Groningen in Groningen from 1954 to 1961, where he received his doctorandus degree (equivalent of Master of Science) cum laude in economics, majoring in international relations. He was a member of Groninger Studentencorps Vindicat atque Polit. In 1959, he became a member of the Labour Party. In 1960, he married Tine Stelling. In 1965, he obtained his doctor degree (equivalent of Doctor of Philosophy) with his thesis De economische gevolgen van de ontwapening (The economic consequences of the disarmament) under the supervision of professor F. J. de Jong.

== Politics ==
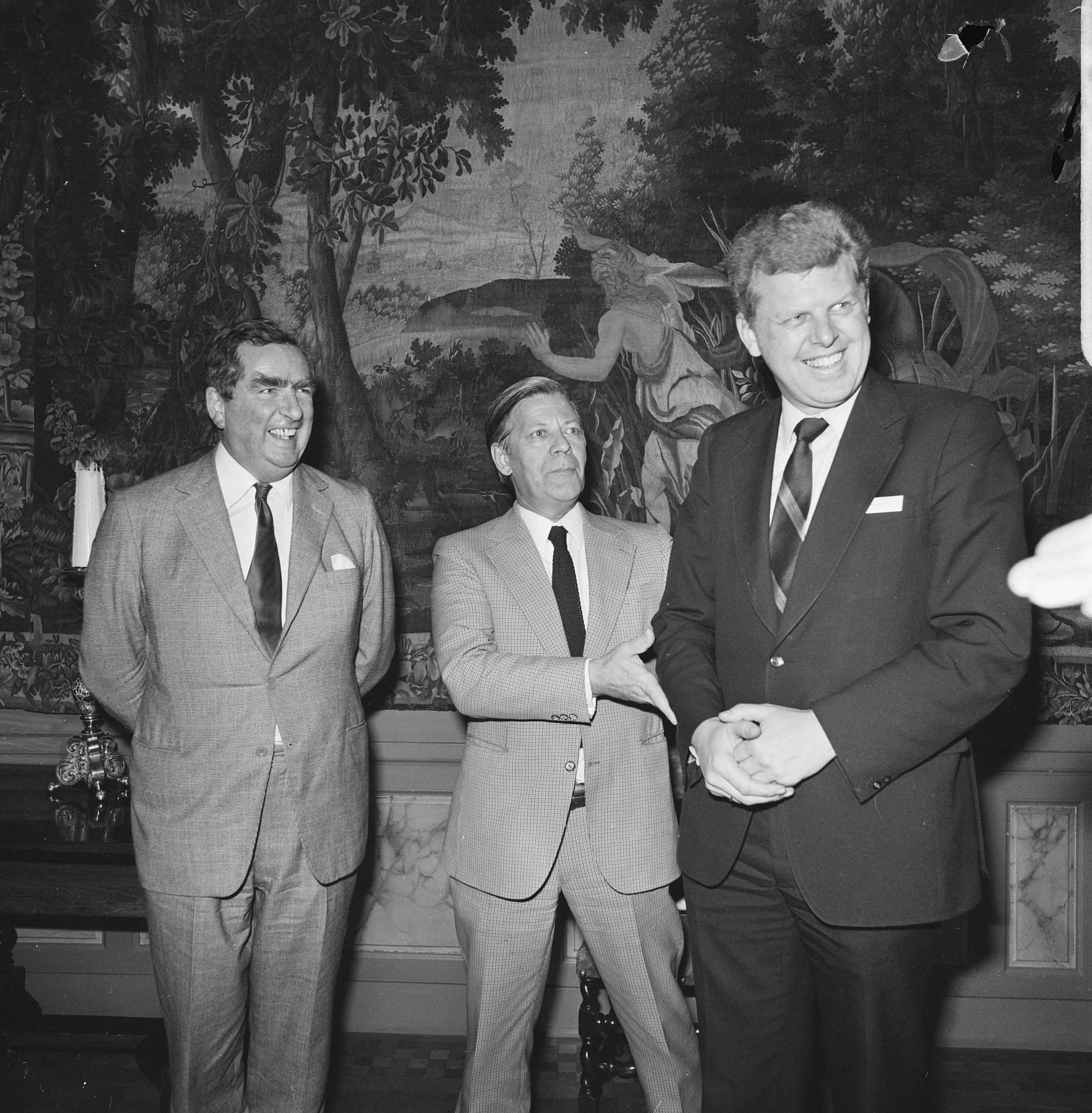
Chancellor of the Exchequer of the United Kingdom Denis Healey, Minister of Finance of West Germany Helmut Schmidt and Minister of Finance Wim Duisenberg during a European Economic Community meeting in The Hague on 24 April 1974

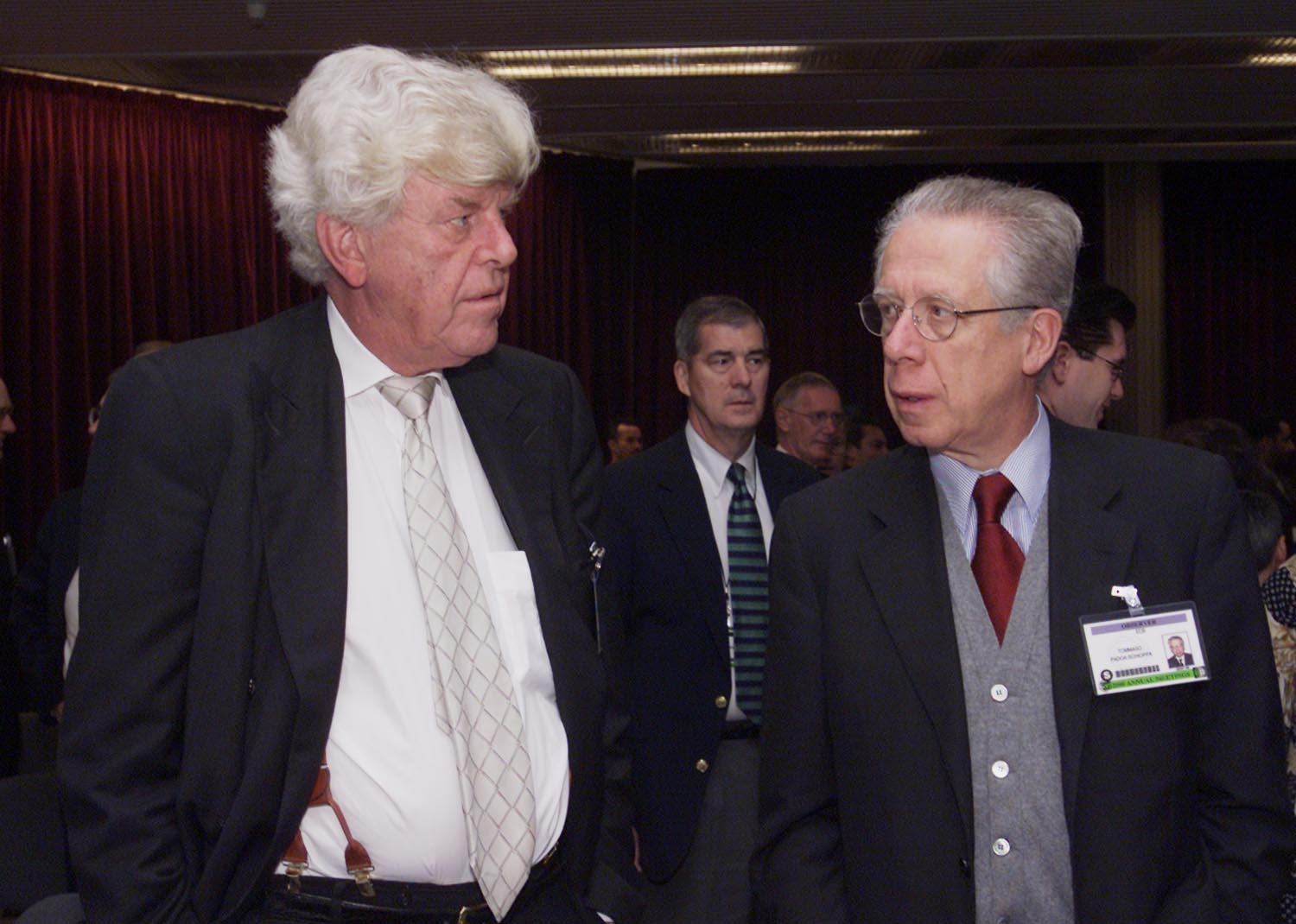
President of the European Central Bank Wim Duisenberg and Member of the Executive Board of the European Central Bank Tommaso Padoa-Schioppa during an International Monetary Fund meeting in Washington, D.C., on 24 September 2000

Duisenberg subsequently worked for the International Monetary Fund in Washington, D.C., for years followed by a year as an advisor to the director of the Nederlandsche Bank, the Dutch central bank in Amsterdam. He was then appointed a professor at the University of Amsterdam where he taught macroeconomics. From 1973 to 1977, Duisenberg was Minister of Finance under Prime Minister Joop den Uyl. Shortly afterwards, he gave up his seat in Parliament to become vice president of Rabobank, a Dutch bank. Two years later, he was appointed director of the Nederlandsche Bank, serving as its president from 1982 to 1997. His tenure at the Dutch central bank was marked by caution and reserve. Under his direction, the Dutch guilder was linked to the German Deutsche Mark; this benefited the Dutch economy, owing to the strength of the German currency. He also followed German central bank's interest rate policies closely, which earned him the nickname "Mr. Fifteen Minutes" because he quickly followed any interest rate changes made by the Deutsche Bundesbank.

== First President of the European Central Bank ==
Owing to the success of his monetary policy, he became well known in other European countries, and this led to his appointment in 1998 as the first president of the new European Central Bank in Frankfurt, much to the chagrin of France, who wanted a French candidate. A compromise was agreed upon (although publicly denied by all parties) whereby Duisenberg would serve for at least four years, upon which the Frenchman Jean-Claude Trichet, director of the Banque de France, would take over. In 1999, Duisenberg received the Vision for Europe Award in recognition of his efforts toward the unification of Europe.

During his tenure at the bank, Duisenberg was known for his cautious monetary policy and for defending the euro through its early years. He sometimes frustrated investors and politicians by sticking to the bank's inflation-fighting stance, keeping rates higher than some would have liked. "I hear, but I don't listen" to such pleas, was one of his typically blunt responses. Duisenberg repeatedly said it was up to European governments to pursue structural changes such as loosening rigid rules on hiring and firing personnel if they wanted more growth. Duisenberg announced he would retire on 9 July 2003 (his 69th birthday), but he remained in office until Trichet was cleared of charges of fraud in connection with the collapse of the French bank Crédit Lyonnais. Trichet took over presidency of the ECB on 1 November 2003.

== Death ==
Duisenberg died in 2005 at the age of 70 while on vacation at his villa in Faucon near Orange, France. He drowned in his swimming pool after suffering a heart attack. A commemoration service was held on 6 August 2005 in the Amsterdam Concertgebouw. Duisenberg was buried later that day in the Zorgvlied cemetery in Amsterdam.

== Decorations ==
- Order of the Netherlands Lion (Netherlands)
  - Knight (11 April 1978)
  - Commander (17 June 1997)
- Commander of the Order of Orange-Nassau (Netherlands)
- Knight Grand Cross of the Order of Isabella the Catholic
- Honorary doctorate in Economics from the University of Amsterdam (8 January 2001)

== See also ==
- Delors Committee

Political offices
Preceded by Roelof Nelissen	Minister of Finance; 1973–1977	Succeeded by Frans Andriessen
Government offices
Preceded by Jelle Zijlstra	President of the Central Bank of the Netherlands; 1982–1997	Succeeded by Nout Wellink
Preceded by Alexandre Lamfalussy	President of the European Monetary Institute; 1997–1998	Position abolished
New office	President of the European Central Bank; 1998–2003	Succeeded by Jean-Claude Trichet
Diplomatic posts
Preceded by Jean Godeaux	President and Chair of the Bank for International Settlements; 1988–1990	Succeeded by Bengt Dennis
Preceded by Bengt Dennis	President and Chair of the Bank for International Settlements; 1994–1997	Succeeded by Alfons Verplaetse
