= Jean-Claude Trichet =

President of the European Central Bank from 2003 to 2011

His Excellency Jean-Claude Trichet
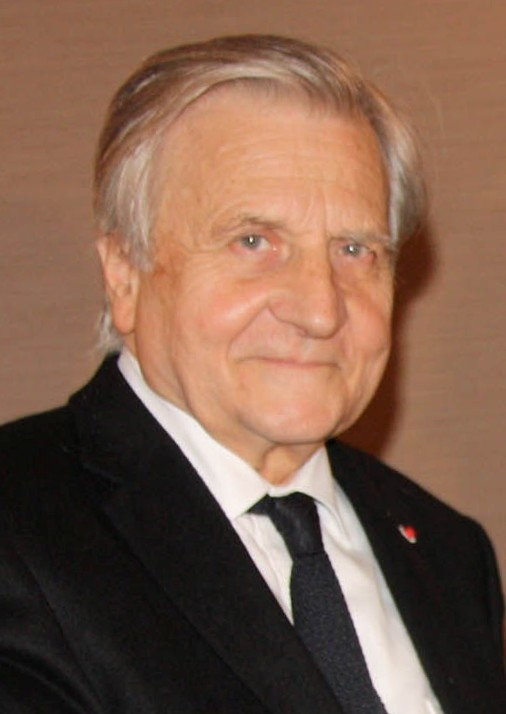
- Trichet in 2011

President of the European Central Bank
- In office 1 November 2003 – 31 October 2011
- Vice President: Lucas Papademos; Vítor Constâncio
- Preceded by: Wim Duisenberg
- Succeeded by: Mario Draghi

Governor of the Bank of France
- In office 19 September 1993 – 1 November 2003
- Preceded by: Jacques de Larosière
- Succeeded by: Christian Noyer

Personal details
- Born: Jean-Claude Anne-Marie Louis Trichet; 20 December 1942 (age 83) Lyon, France
- Spouse: Aline Rybalka (m. 1970)
- Children: 2
- Education: École nationale supérieure des mines de Nancy; University of Paris; Sciences Po; École nationale d'administration

Jean-Claude Anne-Marie Louis Trichet (French: [ʒɑ̃klod tʁiʃɛ]; born 20 December 1942) is a French economist and senior official who was President of the European Central Bank (ECB) from 2004 to 2011. Previous to his assumption of the presidency he was Governor of the Bank of France from 1993 to 2004.

After stepping down from the ECB, Trichet has taken speaking arrangements across France and was on the board of directors of the Bank for International Settlements (BIS). He was also asked to join the Brussels-based non-doctrinal think tank Bruegel to consult on economic policy. In 2008, Trichet ranked fifth on Newsweek's list of the world's most powerful along with economic triumvirs Ben Bernanke (fourth) and Masaaki Shirakawa (sixth).

== Early life and education ==
Trichet was born in 1942 in Lyon, the son of a professor of Greek and Latin. He was educated at the École des Mines de Nancy, from which he graduated in 1964. He later earned a master's degree in economics from the University of Paris and then trained at the Institut d'études politiques de Paris (best known as Sciences Po), finishing in 1966, and the École nationale d'administration (ENA) from 1969–1971, two French higher education institutions in the field of political science and state administration.

== Career ==
=== Career in the public sector ===
From 1987, Trichet was head of the Trésor public. In this capacity, he also chaired the Paris Club of creditor nations in the mid-1980s and was closely involved in debt problems that struck Latin America, Africa and the Middle East. He also became a member of Washington-based financial advisory body, the Group of Thirty. Soon after taking office at Trésor, Trichet oversaw the change to an anti-inflationary franc fort (strong franc) policy, to pave the way for currency union with Germany. In 1993, he led Trésor’s move to grant the Bank of France independence to set its own interest rates.

In 1993, Trichet was appointed governor of Banque de France. Both as director of the French Treasury and then governor of the Banque de France, he was widely seen as one of the architects of the European monetary union.

By 1997, Prime Minister Lionel Jospin and President Jacques Chirac proposed Trichet as France’s candidate for the position as president of the European Central Bank; this way they opposed Wim Duisenberg, the candidate preferred by the majority of the Eurozone members. Under a compromise laid out by German Finance Minister Theo Waigel, Duisenberg would resign midway through his eight-year term to make way for Trichet. On 1 November 2003 he succeeded Wim Duisenberg.

During his time in office, Trichet oversaw the ECB’s response to the European debt crisis, including its Securities Markets Programme to stem the crisis in eurozone government bond markets. In 2011, ECB board member Jürgen Stark resigned in what was widely seen as a protest against this policy.

=== Career in the private sector ===
On 28 January 2012, the board of the European Aeronautic Defence and Space Company approved Trichet’s nomination to the Board, where he represented (with Dominique d’Hinnin of the Lagardère Group) the French state’s holding company SOGEADE.

Trichet succeeded Mario Monti as chairman of the European branch of the Trilateral Commission in 2012.

Trichet was a member of the Eminent Persons Group on Global Financial Governance, which was established by the G20 Finance Ministers and Central Bank Governors for the period from 2017 to 2018. In early 2021, Trichet was appointed by the G20 to the High Level Independent Panel (HLIP) on financing the global commons for pandemic preparedness and response, co-chaired by Ngozi Okonjo-Iweala, Tharman Shanmugaratnam and Lawrence Summers.

== Other activities ==
=== International organizations ===
- European Central Bank, Chair of the Ethics Committee (2016–2019)
- European Systemic Risk Board (ESRB), Chair (2010–2011)

=== Corporate boards ===
- PIMCO, Member of the Global Advisory Board (since 2015)

=== Non-profit organizations ===
- Bretton Woods Committee, Member of the Advisory Council (since 2020)
- Scope Foundation, Member of the Honorary Board (since 2020)
- Center for Economic and Policy Research (CEPR), Distinguished Fellow (since 2019)
- Bruegel, Chairman of the Board (since 2012)
- Bilderberg Group, Member of the Steering Committee
- European Horizons, Advisor
- Complexity Research Initiative for Systemic Instabilities (CRISIS), Member of the Advisory Board
- Institute for Law and Finance at the Goethe University Frankfurt, Member of the Academic Advisory Board
- Systemic Risk Council (SRC), Senior Advisor

== Political positions ==
At the height of the euro crisis, Trichet publicly criticized President Nicolas Sarkozy and Chancellor Angela Merkel, who had agreed at a meeting in Deauville in 2010 that sovereign debt could be restructured in a bailout to make private investors pay their share; the plan was never implemented.

At the ceremony for the Charlemagne Prize in 2011, Trichet called for the creation of a central finance ministry to oversee spending by countries that use the euro.

On 5 August 2011 Trichet wrote, together with Mario Draghi, a letter to the Italian government to push for a series of economic measures that would soon be implemented in Italy.

In 2015, Trichet joined forces with two other former governors of the Bank of France – Michel Camdessus and Jacques de Larosière – in publicly supporting President François Hollande’s appointment of François Villeroy de Galhau to head the central bank.

In a 2019 article for the Financial Times, Trichet publicly hit back against some of his former colleagues at the European Central Bank – including Jürgen Stark and Otmar Issing, who both worked as ECB chief economist under Trichet’s presidency –, calling them "misguided" in their criticism of the loose monetary policy pursued by his successor as president Mario Draghi.

== Controversy ==
=== Crédit Lyonnais scandal ===
In January 2003, Trichet was put on trial with eight others charged with irregularities at Crédit Lyonnais, one of France's biggest banks. Trichet was in charge of the French treasury at that time. He was cleared in June 2003, which left the way clear for him to move to the ECB. A parliamentary inquiry found no wrong-doing by Trichet, other civil servants or the three finance ministers in office during the critical period.

=== 2009 banking crisis ===
Within the European Central Bank, Trichet strongly resisted any contemplation of Greece defaulting on its debt. It was only in October 2011, with the end of his term imminent, that consensus was reached to allow a 50% cut in the value of Greek bonds.

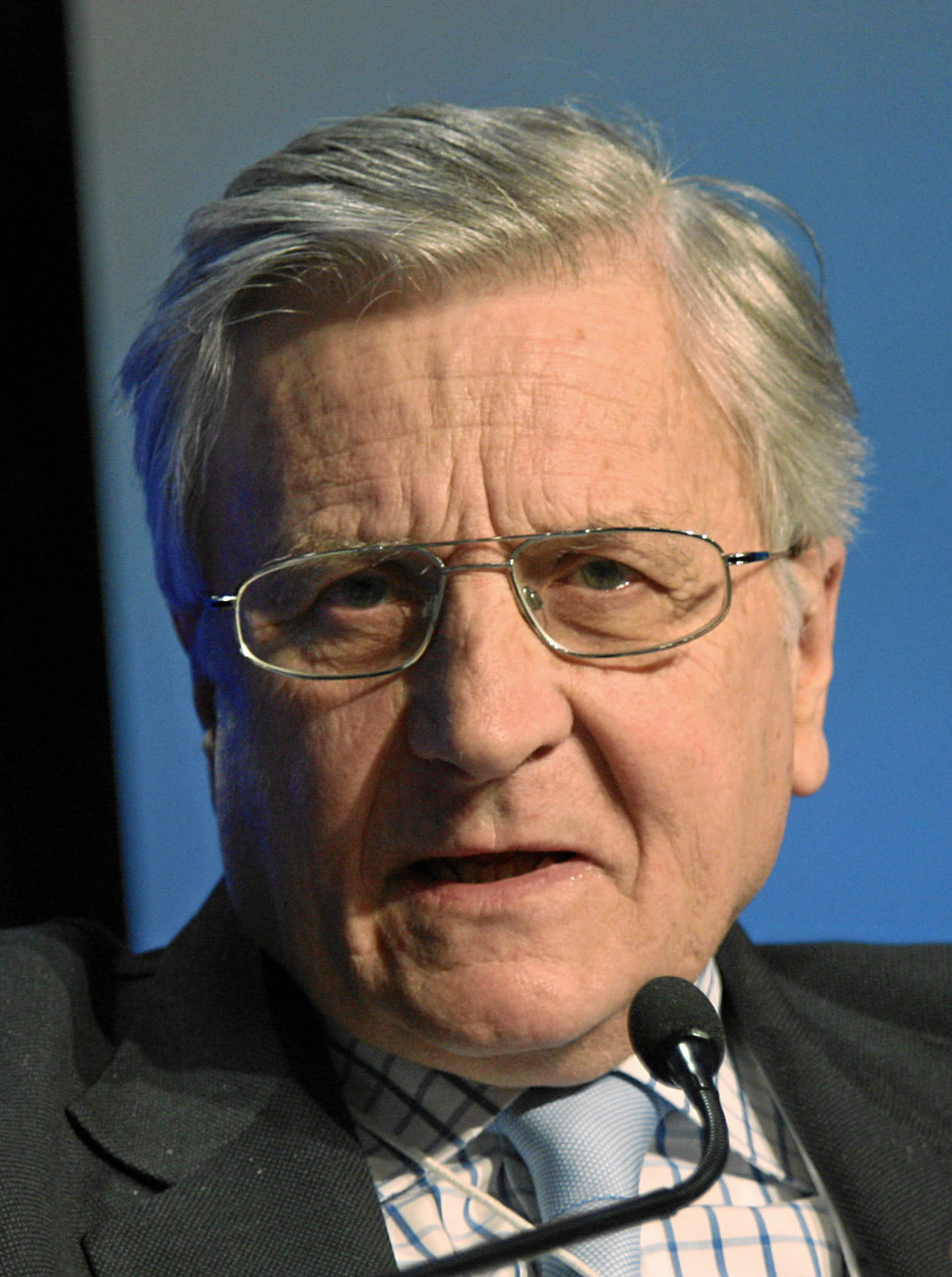
Trichet during the WEF 2010

=== Hypo Alpe Adria bailout ===
As part of a 2015 investigation launched by Austria’s parliament into defunct lender Hypo Alpe Adria, then opposition party NEOS named Trichet among 200 people it wanted to question. At the time of Austria purchasing Hypo Alpe Adria from BayernLB in late 2009, Trichet had lobbied for the deal.

Trichet has been criticised for the ECB's response to the Great Recession, which emphasised price stability over recovery and growth. He was also criticized when he refused to answer a question about a possible conflict of interests concerning his successor's involvement at Goldman Sachs before taking charge as head of the ECB.

== Personal life ==
At age 22, Trichet married Aline Rybalka, a diplomat and translator whose parents immigrated to France from Ukraine. They have two sons: Pierre-Alexis Trichet (born 1971), a marketing strategy director at telecommunications company Orange SA; and Jean-Nicolas Trichet (born 1974), a musician and producer.

== Honours and awards ==
- France: Grand Officer of the Legion of Honour
- France: Officer of the National Order of Merit
- Germany: Grand Cross 1st Class of the Order of Merit of the Federal Republic of Germany (2011)
- Hesse: Knight of the Hessian Order of Merit (2011)
- Luxembourg: Vision for Europe Award, for his contributions toward greater European integration (2008)
- Luxembourg: Collier de la Fondation du Mérite européen (6 March 2013)
- Netherlands: Knight Grand Cross of the Order of Orange-Nassau (21 January 2011)
- Poland: Grand Cross with Star of the Order of Merit of the Republic of Poland (2011).
- Portugal: Grand Cross of the Order of Prince Henry (6 May 2010)
- Bulgaria: Honorary Doctor of the University of National and World Economy in Sofia (2009)
- Japan: Grand Cordon of the Order of the Rising Sun (2018)

Government offices
| Preceded by Jacques de Larosière | Governor of the Bank of France; 1993–2003 | Succeeded by Christian Noyer |
| Preceded by Wim Duisenberg | President of the European Central Bank; 2003–2011 | Succeeded by Mario Draghi |
Diplomatic posts
| Preceded by Mario Monti | European Group Chairman of the Trilateral Commission; 2011–present | Incumbent |
