= Caroline Kende-Robb =

British economic adviser

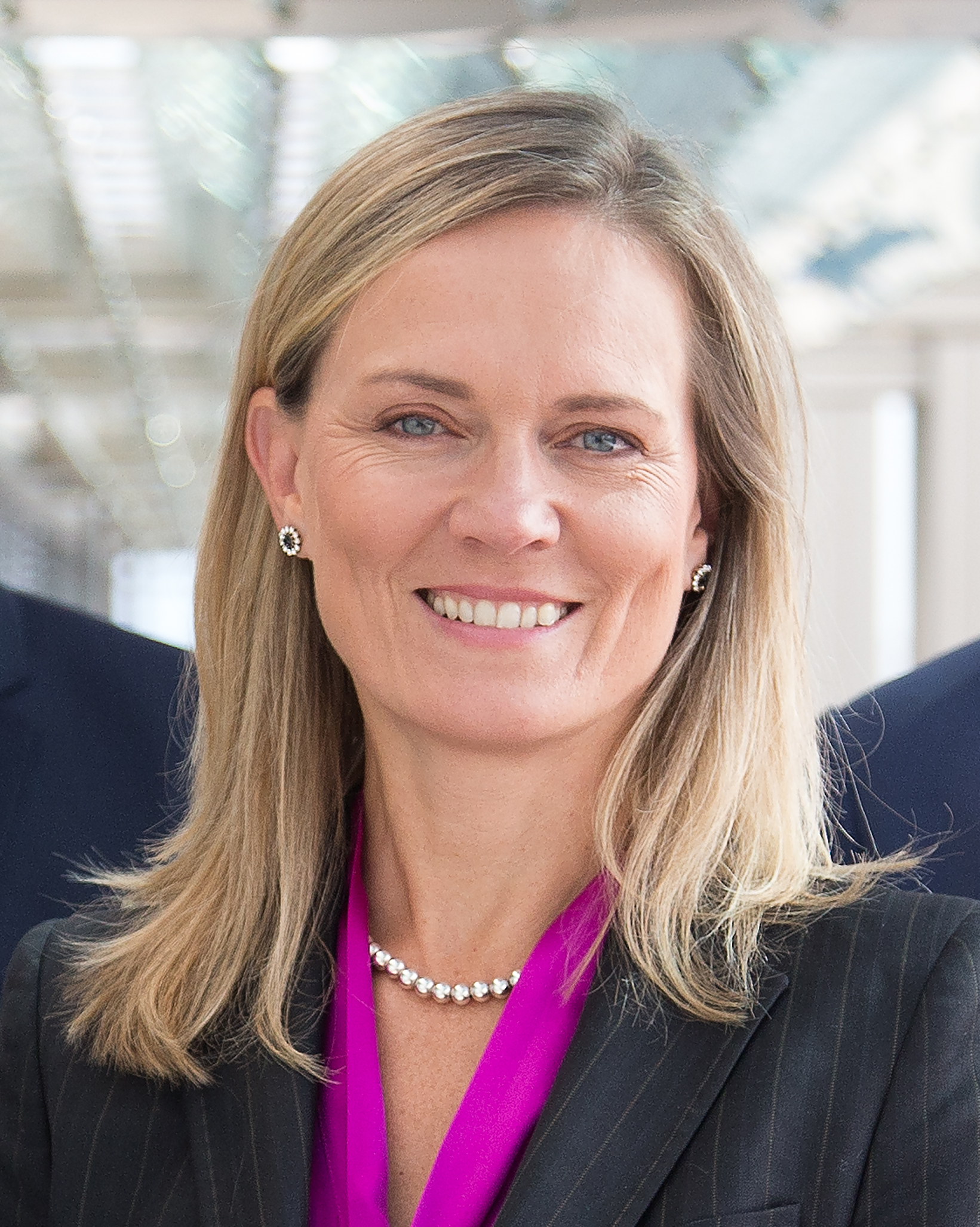
Caroline Kende-Robb in 2016

Caroline Kende-Robb (born 23 May 1963, Fleetwood, England) is a Senior Adviser at the African Center for Economic Transformation, a Pan-African think tank influencing policy across Africa and globally to support Africa’s long-term growth through transformation.

== Early life and education ==
Kende-Robb was born in Fleetwood and grew up in Anchorsholme, a suburb of Blackpool, in the early sixties. Her mother Ann Robb was a school teacher and her father, Robert Laundry Thomas Robb, was a fighter pilot who flew Spitfires during the World War II. Kende-Robb is the sister of John Robb, a British music journalist, author, punk musician, and social commentator and Alastair Robb a British diplomat working in the field of health and social change.

Kende-Robb graduated from Liverpool University, where she earned a BA (Hons) in Geography, and completed a MSc in Social Policy at the London School of Economics and Political Science.

== Career ==
=== Early beginnings ===
Kende-Robb began her career in 1983 as a manager in the private sector with Marks and Spencer. From 1989 to 1993, she lived in The Gambia, working initially with the Gambian Government as a community development advisor on an artisanal fisheries development project, where she lived in the village of Tanji and learnt to speak Mandinka.

=== Career with the UN ===
Kende-Robb became the West Africa Field Director for Africa Now, a civil society organization, and later joined the United Nations Development Programme (UNDP) in The Gambia. She also worked at the World Bank (2005-2011) as a senior manager for the Sustainable Development Network in the regions of Africa, Europe and Central Asia, and East Asia and the International Monetary Fund (1999-2005) as the first Social Development Advisor recruited to manage the introduction of a poverty and social perspective into the Fund’s macroeconomic programs and policy dialogue.

=== Africa Progress Panel ===
From 2011 to 2016, Kende-Robb served as Executive Director of the Africa Progress Panel, a foundation chaired by Kofi Annan. In this capacity, she worked closely with Anna and the other members of the panel, including Michel Camdessus, Peter Eigen, Bob Geldof, President Olusegun Obasanjo, Graça Machel, Linah Mohohlo, Robert Rubin, Tidjane Thiam and Strive Masiyiwa. The Africa Progress Panel was formed at Gleneagles G8 Summit, 2005, as a recommendation from the Commission for Africa Report.

Kende-Robb led the publication of the Africa Progress Panel’s flagship reports. The reports constitute a significant body of knowledge and have effectively influenced policy: Jobs, Justice and Equity: Seizing opportunities in times of global change] (2012); Equity in Extractives: Stewarding Africa's natural resources for all (2013); Grain, Fish, Money: Financing Africa's Green and Blue Revolutions (2014); and Power People Planet (2015).

=== Later career ===
In 2017, Kende-Robb served as Chief Adviser to Gordon Brown at the International Commission on Financing Education. From 2018 until 2019, she was the Secretary-General of the international non-government organization CARE International providing humanitarian assistance and sustainable development with a focus on women and girls.

According to The Guardian, Kende-Robb was one of the British government's candidates considered for succeeding Mark Lowcock as United Nations Under-Secretary-General for Humanitarian Affairs and Emergency Relief Coordinator in 2021.

== Other activities ==
Kende-Robb was a member of the World Economic Forum’s Global Future Councils on Growth and Inclusion. Kende-Robb is the author of many publications including, Can the Poor Influence Policy? a book co-published by the World Bank and the IMF.

Kende-Robb has appeared on various TV and radio shows including TV5 Monde, BBC and CNBC. She writes for various newspapers and blogs including The Guardian.

== Personal life ==
Kende-Robb is married to economist Michael Kende and they have three daughters. In 2016, Mike Pence and his wife Karen temporarily rented the family's house in the Washington neighborhood of Chevy Chase.

== Selected publications ==
Books and book chapters

- Harris, E and Robb, C (2008) "Integrating Macroeconomic Policies and Social Objectives: Choosing the Right Policy Mix for Poverty Reduction”, in Inclusive Institutions, edited by A. Dani and A. de Haan, World Bank, Washington DC.
- Robb, C and van Wicklen, W (2008) "Giving the Most Vulnerable a Voice", in Integrating Environmental Considerations in Policy Formulation: Lessons from Policy-Based SEA Experience, edited by K. Ahmed, World Bank, Washington DC.
- Robb, C (2004) “Shifting Power Relations in the History of Aid”, in Inclusive Aid: Changing Power and Relationships in International Development, edited by L. Groves and R. Hinton, Earthscan, London.
- Robb, C (2002) Can the Poor Influence Policy? Participatory Poverty Assessments in the Developing World, Second Edition, IMF/World Bank joint publication, Washington DC.
- Robb, C (2002) Pueden Los Pobres Influenciar Las Politicas? Evaluaciones Participativas de la Pobreza en el Mundo en Desarrollo. Segunda Edicion, Alfaomega, Colombia.
- Robb, C (1999) Can the Poor Influence Policy? Participatory Poverty Assessments in the Developing World, First Edition, Directions in Development Series, World Bank, Washington DC.

Journal articles and papers

- Robb, C (2003) Poverty and Social Impact Analysis – Linking Macroeconomic Policies to Poverty Outcomes. Summary of Early Experiences, Working Paper, Number 03/43, IMF, Washington DC.
- Robb, C and Scott, A (2001) Reviewing Some Early Poverty Reduction Strategy Papers in Africa, Policy Discussion Paper, Number 01/5, IMF, Washington DC.
- Robb, C (2000) How the Poor Can Influence Government Policy, Finance and Development, Volume 37 Number 4, IMF, Washington DC.
