= Commission for Africa =

British government commission

The Commission for Africa, also known as the Blair Commission for Africa, was an initiative established by the British government to examine and provide impetus for development in Africa. Initiated in Spring 2004, its objectives include the generation of new ideas for development and to deliver implementation of existing international commitments towards Africa. African leaders form a majority of the 17 commissioners.

The report of the commission was released in March 2005. The publication was welcomed by international agencies, who also urged caution. "The proof of the Africa Commission’s worth will be in the political will and energy it manages to drum up to turn its recommendations into reality," said a spokesperson for Oxfam.

The commission and its report had a clear impact upon the public debate in the UK, and to some extent elsewhere, on how development in Africa might be accelerated. At the G8 summit of world leaders in Gleneagles, Scotland that year, the report was seen as a blueprint for action by the G8. The Gleneagles summit pledged what the Commission report had asked for in terms of a doubling of aid and significant extensions of multilateral debt relief. But it failed to deliver what the commission had demanded on trade – including an end to agricultural export subsidies by rich nations and end to 'reciprocity' in world trade negotiations.

The summit did, however, promise to implement 50 of the commission's 90 recommendations including: $36bn of debt relief in 100% debt cancellation delivered for 19 countries; the launch of the UN Central Emergency Response Fund (CERF); doubling previous levels of aid for basic education, to remove school fees, and to scale up efforts to boost girls’ participation and female literacy; two million additional Africans given antiretroviral treatment for HIV/AIDS; immunisation programmes which have stopped the transmission of polio everywhere except Nigeria; training 20,000 more African peacekeepers; tightening controls on the trade in small arms; working more closely with the African Union and its New Partnership for Africa (Nepad) programme to make African governments more accountable to their people; pressing rich nations to ratify the UN Convention on Corruption; putting in place measures to return cash looted by dictators from Western banks to the legitimate owners; and using export credits to clamp down on Western companies who pay bribes.

After the summit however the profile of the report faded but it clearly had a major impact on the delivery of policy, though it is not clear whether all the Commission recommendations which were pledged at Gleneagles will be fully implemented.

In April 2007, the Africa Progress Panel (APP) was launched as an independent authority on Africa to focus world leaders' attention on delivering their commitments to the continent. The Panel, chaired by Kofi Annan, is composed of Michel Camdessus, Peter Eigen, Bob Geldof, Graça Machel, Strive Masiyiwa, Linah Mohohlo, Robert Rubin, and Tidjane Thiam.

On 13 September 2010, the commission launched a second report, Still Our Common Interest, looking at what had happened since the last report – both in Africa and against the individual recommendations made in 2005. It found that, despite considerable progress towards the Millennium Development Goals in many African countries, Africa's economic success over the preceding five years had yet to be translated into economic benefits for the majority of Africans. The report noted that there had been progress against many of the recommendations, but very little movement in the area of trade reform, in particular. It made new recommendations on how to ensure that the promise of Africa's accelerated economic growth was converted into development across the sub-Saharan African region. It called on African countries to continue reforms that would make it easier to invest and do business and on African governments to fulfill their commitments to spending on health, education, water, sanitation and infrastructure. It called for continued and expanding aid from developed countries, but reiterated the importance of making progress on increasing Africa's share of global trade. It is stated that one per cent of global trade is worth $195 billion to Africa in 2009 – five times the amount it received in aid.

== Commissioners ==
- Tony Blair (chair) – Former Prime Minister of the United Kingdom, Envoy of the Quartet on the Middle East
- Fola Adeola – Chairman of the FATE Foundation (Nigeria)
- K. Y. Amoako – Executive Secretary of the Economic Commission for Africa and Under-Secretary-General of the United Nations (Ghana)
- Nancy Kassebaum Baker – Former Senator (United States)
- Hilary Benn – Former Secretary of State for International Development (United Kingdom)
- Gordon Brown – Former Prime Minister of the United Kingdom
- Michel Camdessus – Africa Personal Representative (France)
- Bob Geldof – Musician and founder of Live Aid (Ireland)
- Ralph Goodale – Former Finance Minister (Canada)
- Ji Peiding – Member of the Standing Committee of the National People's Congress and its Foreign Affairs Committee (China)
- William S. Kalema – chairman of the board of the Uganda Investment Authority (Uganda)
- Trevor Manuel – Minister of Finance (South Africa)
- Benjamin Mkapa – Former President of Tanzania
- Linah Mohohlo – Governor of the Bank of Botswana (Botswana)
- Tidjane Thiam – Group Strategy and Development Director Aviva PLC, (Côte d'Ivoire)
- Anna Tibaijuka – Director of UN HABITAT and Under-Secretary-General of the United Nations (Tanzania)
- Meles Zenawi – Prime Minister of Ethiopia (died on 20 August 2012)
