= Wallace Campbell =

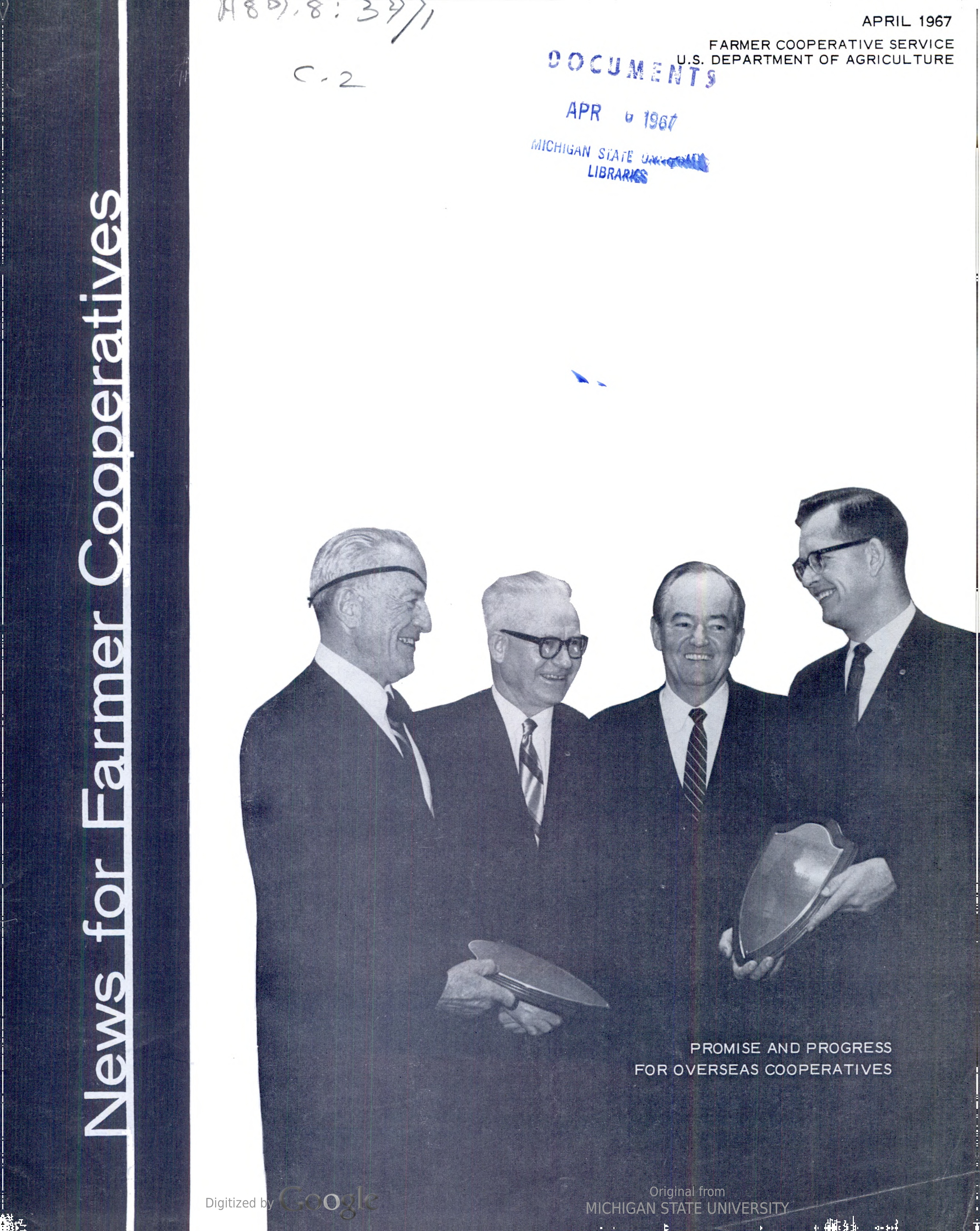
Campbell (second from left) on the cover of News for Farmer Cooperatives, April 1967

Wallace Campbell was the co-founder of CARE International, a nonprofit humanitarian organization.

== Biography ==
Campbell was born in Three Forks, Montana in 1911.

After he obtained his master's degree in Sociology from the University of Oregon, he worked for the Cooperative League of the USA in New York City.

Arthur Ringland with his long experience with refugees came up with the initial idea and discussed it with Campbell and Lincoln Clark whose work for charitable organizations was important in bridging between government and private endeavors: a hallmark of the early CARE. Their ideas became the Cooperative for American Remittances to Europe (CARE), whose acronym was changed twice, most recently in 1993 to stand for "Cooperative for Assistance and Relief Everywhere".

In 1945, they launched the CARE, and Wallace Campbell continued to serve that organization for many years, serving as its president from 1978 to 1986.

Campbell authored The History of Care: A Personal Account, published 1990. ISBN 0-275-93231-1, Library of Congress Catalog Card Number 90-31860.

Campbell died January 7, 1998, in Los Angeles, California.

The Extra Mile National Monument in Washington, DC selected Campbell as one of its 37 honorees. The Extra Mile pays homage to Americans who set their own self-interest aside to help others and successfully brought positive social change to the United States.

== Other ==
The Campbell Club, a students' cooperative affiliated with the University of Oregon, was named after him.
