= Russian Famine Relief Act =

1921 United States law

- Long title: An Act for the relief of the distressed and starving people of Russia.
- Acronyms (colloquial): RFRA
- Nicknames: Russian Famine Relief Act of 1921
- Enacted by: the 67th United States Congress
- Effective: December 22, 1921

Citations
- Public law: Pub. L. 67–117
- Statutes at Large: 42 Stat. 351

Legislative history
- Introduced in the House as H.R. 9548 by Henry Wilson Temple (R–PA) on December 14, 1921; Committee consideration by House Foreign Affairs; Passed the House on December 17, 1921 (188-79); Passed the Senate on December 20, 1921 (Passed); Reported by the joint conference committee on December 21, 1921; agreed to by the House on December 21, 1921 (agreed) and by the Senate on December 22, 1921 (agreed); Signed into law by President Warren G. Harding on December 22, 1921

The Russian Famine Relief Act of 1921 was formed by the United States Congress on February 24, 1919, with a budget of 100 million dollars ($1,857,000,000 in 2025). Its budget was boosted by private donations, which resulted in another 100 million dollars. In the immediate aftermath of the war, the program delivered more than four million tons of relief supplies to 23 war-torn European countries. Between 1919 and 1921, Arthur Cuming Ringland was chief of mission in Europe. ARA ended its operations outside Russia in 1922; it operated in Russia until 1923.

Under Herbert Hoover, very large scale food relief was distributed to Europe after the war through the American Relief Administration. In 1921, to ease the devastating famine in the Russian SFSR the ARA's director in Europe, Walter Lyman Brown, began negotiating with the Russian People's Commissar for Foreign Affairs, Maxim Litvinov, in Riga, Latvia (at that time not yet annexed by the USSR). An agreement was reached on August 21, 1921, and an additional implementation agreement was signed by Brown and People's Commissar for Foreign Trade Leonid Krasin on December 30, 1921. The U.S. Congress appropriated $20,000,000 for relief under the Russian Famine Relief Act of late 1921. Hoover strongly detested Bolshevism, and felt the American aid would demonstrate the superiority of Western capitalism and thus help contain the spread of communism.

At its peak, the ARA employed 300 Americans, more than 120,000 Russians and fed 10.5 million people daily. Its Russian operations were headed by Col. William N. Haskell. The Medical Division of the ARA functioned from November 1921 to June 1923 and helped overcome the typhus epidemic then ravaging Russia. The ARA's famine relief operations ran in parallel with much smaller Mennonite, Jewish and Quaker famine relief operations in Russia.

The ARA's operations in Russia were shut down on June 15, 1923, after it was discovered that Russia under Lenin had renewed the export of grain.

== Gallery ==
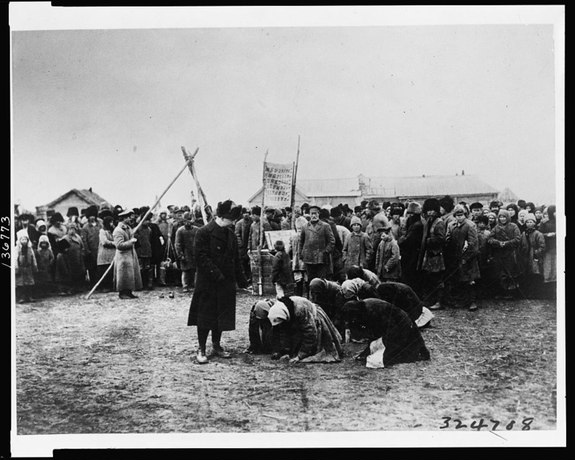
American Relief Administration operations in Russia, 1922

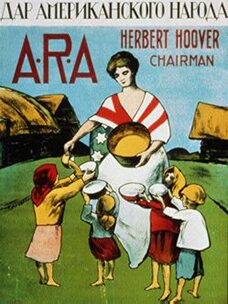
1921 ARA poster saying "The Gift of the American People" in Russian

== Sources ==
- Patenaude, Bertrand M. "Hoover Archives: Food as a Weapon". Hoover Digest - Research and Opinion on Public Policy. Hoover Institution. Archived from the original on 2008-07-19.
- Peters, Gerhard; Woolley, John T. "Calvin Coolidge: 'First Annual Message', December 6, 1923". The American Presidency Project. University of California - Santa Barbara.
- "Revelations from the Russian Archives". Exhibitions. United States Library of Congress. 15 June 1992.
