= Sofía Sprechmann Sineiro =

Uruguayan humanitarian (born 1969)

- Born: January, 1969; Uruguay
- Education: Universidad de la República Oriental del Uruguay, London School of Hygiene and Tropical Medicine
- Employer: CARE International
- Predecessor: Lindsay Glassco

Sofía Sprechmann Sineiro (born 1969) is a Uruguayan humanitarian and Secretary General of the development charity CARE International. She lives in Ecuador.

== Education ==
Sprechmann was born in January 1969 and is a Uruguayan citizen. She holds a Bachelor of Arts's degree in sociology from the Universidad de la República Oriental del Uruguay and a Master of science degree in epidemiology from the London School of Hygiene and Tropical Medicine.

== Career ==
Sprechmann Sineiro has worked in international development since 1994. Based in Ecuador, Sprechmann Sineiro has served as Secretary General at CARE International since 2020, taking over from Lindsay Glassco as of 1 June 2022. She has worked for CARE for over thirty years, including as program director for the CARE International Secretariat.

=== Gender equality ===
Sprechmann Sineiro was integral to placing women and gender justice at the heart of CARE International's work.

=== Climate change ===
Writing for the Thomson Reuters Foundation in 2022, Sprechmann Sineiro highlighted the gendered impact of climate change and climate migration. She said that change would affect women 80% of the time and they would bear the brunt of forced migration. Sprechmann Sineiro noted that the conditions that force migration can be mitigated as it is not always inevitable. However, when it cannot be avoided then planning can reduce the effects of domestic violence and food shortages that can be disproportionally shared by gender.

=== COVID-19 pandemic ===
In response to the COVID-19 pandemic, Sprechmann Sineiro called on international non-governmental organisations for more cohesive, coherent responses between the international development and humanitarian sectors. She noted that the pandemic saw a decrease of aid towards those most vulnerable to the pandemic.
