= American Relief Administration =

US military effort to prevent starvation in Europe

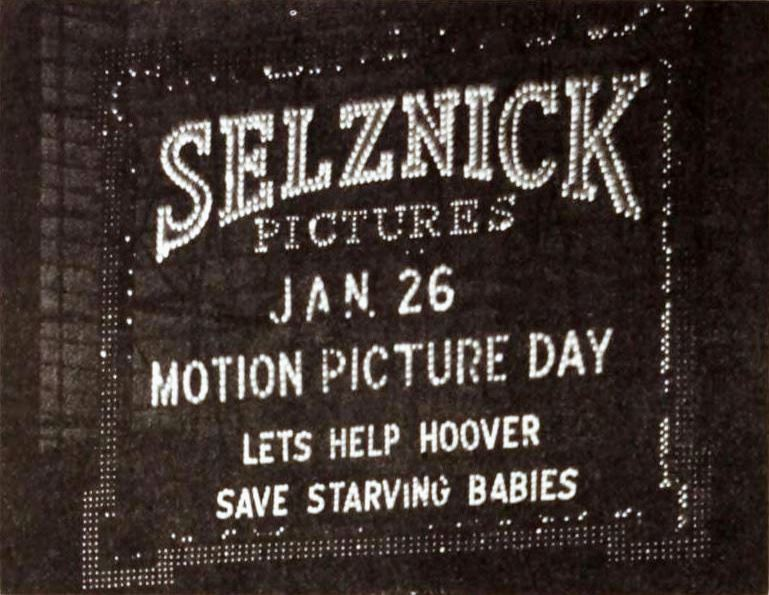
- Proceeds from admissions on Motion Picture Day in 1921 went to Hoover's European relief
- Founded: 1919; 107 years ago
- Founders: United States Congress
- Type: Non-governmental organization, Non-profit organization
- Purpose: Humanitarianism
- Region served: Europe, Russia
- Method: Aid
- Key people: Herbert Hoover, future president

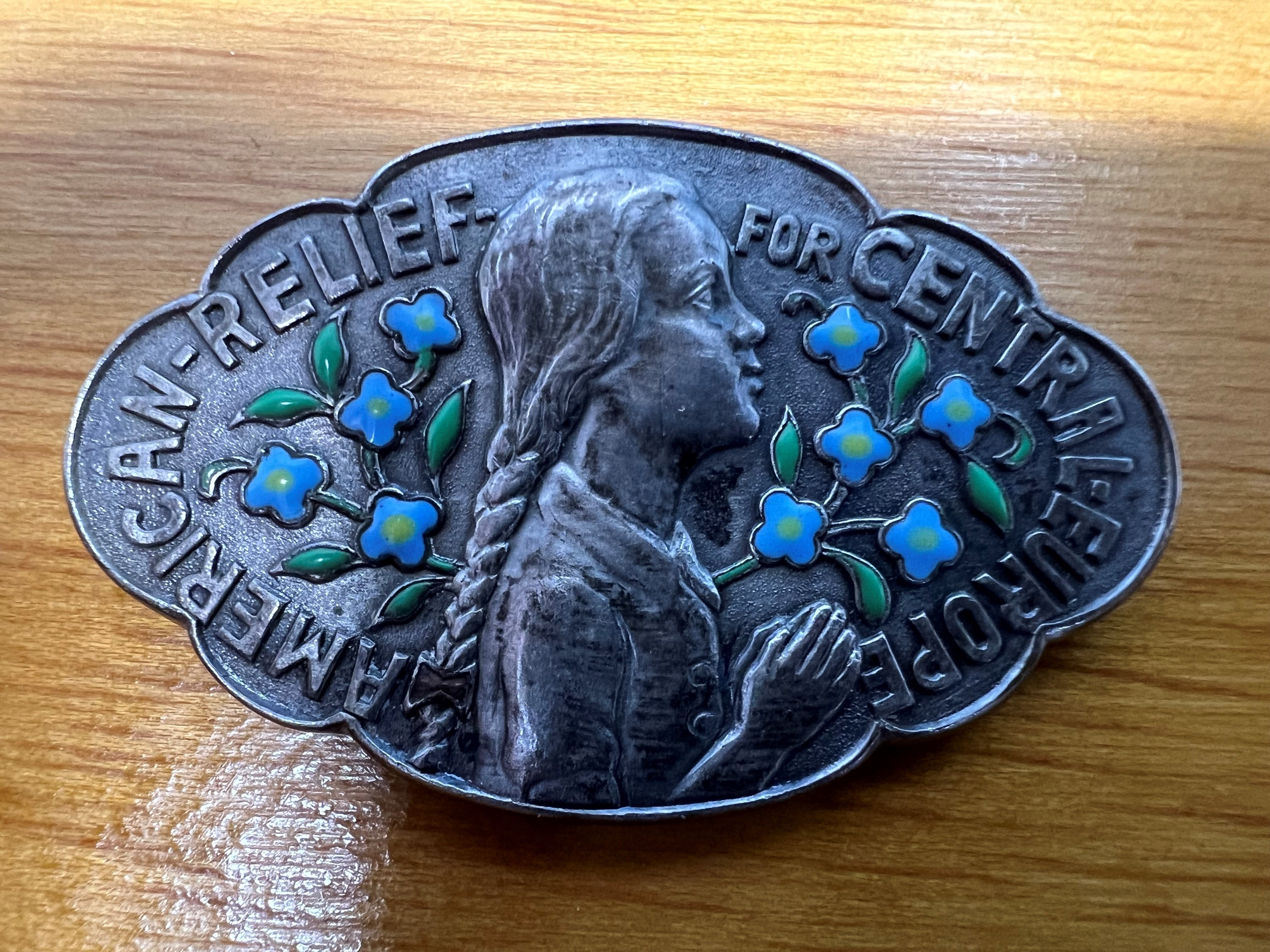
American Relief for Central Europe Dress Pin, circa 1919.

American Relief Administration (ARA) was an American relief mission to Europe and later post-revolutionary Russia after World War I. Herbert Hoover, future president of the United States, was the program director.

The ARA's immediate predecessor was the important United States Food Administration, also headed by Hoover. He and some of his collaborators had already gained useful experience by running the Commission for Relief in Belgium which fed seven million Belgians and two million northern French during World War I.

ARA was formed by the United States Congress on February 24, 1919, with a budget of 100 million dollars ($1,857,000,000 in 2025). Its budget was boosted by private donations, which resulted in another 100 million dollars. In the immediate aftermath of the war, the ARA delivered more than four million tons of relief supplies to 23 war-torn European countries. Between 1919 and 1921, Arthur Cuming Ringland was chief of mission in Europe. ARA ended its operations outside Russia in 1922; it operated in Russia until 1923.

== American relief and Poland ==
About 20% of the organization's resources were directed to the newly established Second Polish Republic. Much of its resources were helping Polish children, who expressed their appreciation by sending illustrated letters to Hoover. ARA however has been criticized by Russian sympathizers for aiding Polish soldiers amidst the Soviet invasion of Poland. Polish leader Józef Piłsudski has written a note of personal thanks to Hoover; one of the streets in Warsaw has been named after him; he also received honorary degrees from the Jagiellonian University, Warsaw University and Lwów University, among other honors (such as several honorary citizenships of various Polish towns). A monument dedicated to American helpers has been constructed in Warsaw.

Colonel Alvin B. Barber headed the group from 1919 to 1922. Specific areas had directors as well, such as William N. Haskell, who was Director of the ARA in Romania as of 1919.

== American relief and the Russian famine of 1921 ==
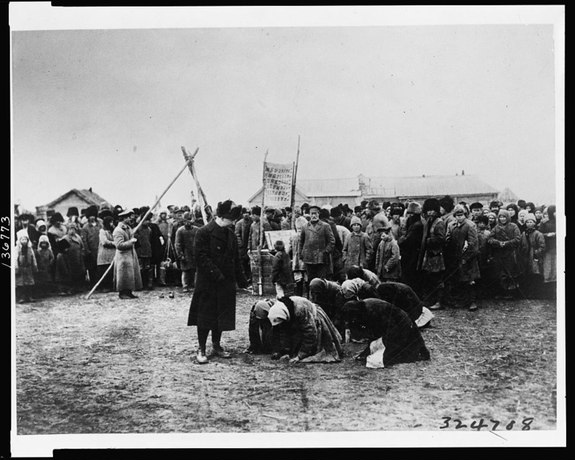
American Relief Administration operations in Russia, 1922

Under Herbert Hoover, very large scale food relief was distributed to Europe after the war through the American Relief Administration. In 1921, to ease the devastating famine in the Russian SFSR that was triggered by the Soviet government's war communism policies, the ARA's director in Europe, Walter Lyman Brown, began negotiating with the Russian First Deputy People's Commissar for Foreign Affairs, Maxim Litvinov, in Riga, Latvia (at that time not yet annexed by the USSR). An agreement was reached on August 21, 1921, and an additional implementation agreement was signed by Brown and People's Commissar for Foreign Trade Leonid Krasin on December 30, 1921. The U.S. Congress appropriated $20,000,000 for relief under the Russian Famine Relief Act of late 1921. Hoover strongly detested Bolshevism, and felt the American aid would demonstrate the superiority of Western capitalism and thus help contain the spread of communism.

A first hand account of an American in Russia on the behalf of Hoover's ARA, was Henry C. Wolfe. He briefly mentions his experience in his book the Imperial Soviets.

At its peak, the ARA employed 300 Americans, more than 120,000 Russians and fed 10.5 million people daily. Its Russian operations were headed by Col. William N. Haskell. The Medical Division of the ARA functioned from November 1921 to June 1923 and helped overcome the typhus epidemic then ravaging Russia. The ARA's famine relief operations ran in parallel with much smaller Mennonite, Jewish and Quaker famine relief operations in Russia. In addition, the Vatican created a Papal Relief Mission under the ARA, headed by Father Edmund A. Walsh, SJ.

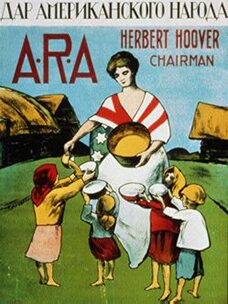
1921 ARA poster saying "The Gift of the American People" in Russian

The ARA's operations in Russia were shut down on June 15, 1923, after it was discovered that Russia under Lenin renewed the export of grain.

== See also ==
- Foreign policy of Herbert Hoover
- American Committee for Relief in the Near East
- The President's Economic Mission to Germany and Austria
- Hoover Institution Library and Archives
- GARIOA: Government Aid and Relief in Occupied Areas
- UNRRA: United Nations Relief and Rehabilitation Administration
- Marshall Plan: European Recovery Program (ERP)

People

- James Stuart McKnight, worked with the agency
- Theodore Whitmarsh, worked with the agency
