= A. B. Barber =

United States Army officer (1883–1961)

Alvin Barton Barber
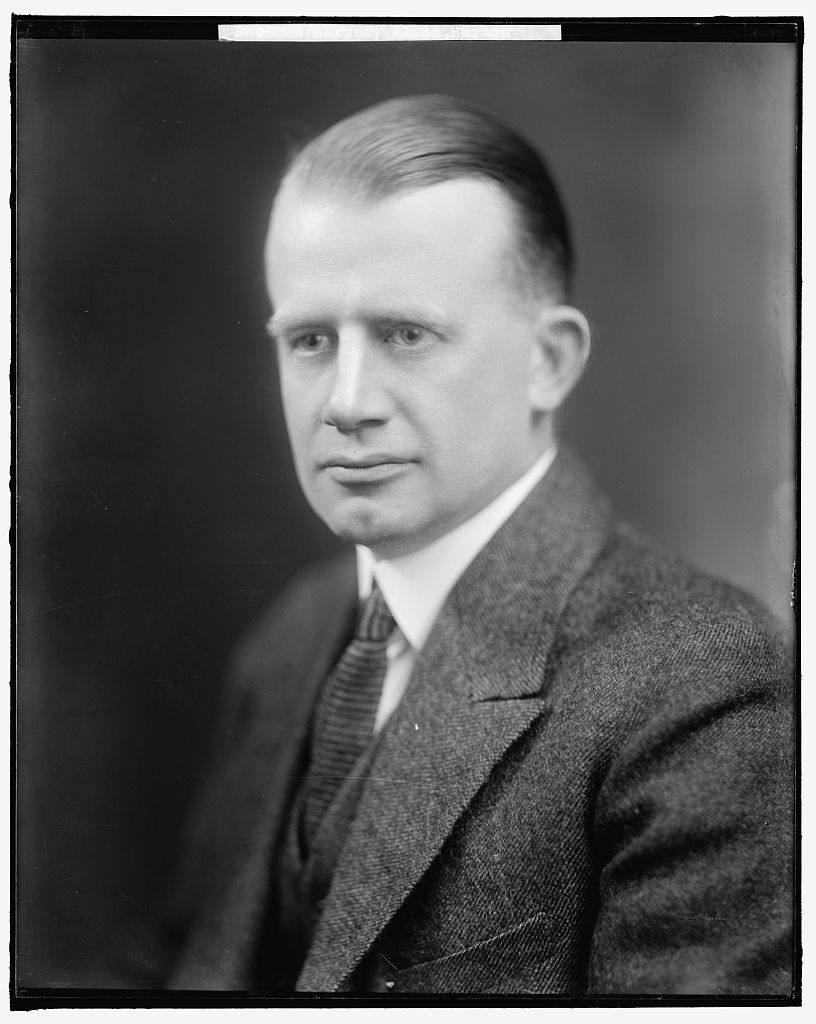
- Born: May 19, 1883; Portland, Oregon, US
- Died: September 16, 1961 (aged 78)
- Burial place: Arlington National Cemetery
- Military career
- Allegiance: United States of America
- Branch: United States Army
- Service years: 1905–1920
- Rank: Colonel
- Conflicts: World War I

Colonel Alvin Barton Barber (May 19, 1883 – September 16, 1961) headed the American Relief Administration in Poland from 1919 to 1922. He then worked for the United States Chamber of Commerce from 1923 to 1948.

== History ==
Alvin Barton Barber was born May 19, 1883, in Portland, Oregon, the son of Sumner Joseph and Ellen (née Barton) Barber. He attended the United States Military Academy from June 11, 1901, to June 13, 1905, graduating 5th in his class. After graduation, he was commissioned a Second Lieutenant and assigned to the United States Army Corps of Engineers. He was responsible for duties relating to military and public works in the United States and Philippines. In 1906 he assisted in the relief efforts after an earthquake in San Francisco.

During World War I, from May to June 1917, he served with the Railway Commission in England and France. He served in various Headquarters and field units until January 31, 1919. From February through August 4, 1919, he was in Paris with the American Relief Administration, in charge of transportation and distribution, under the direction of Herbert Hoover.

From August 1919 to 1922, he was appointed chief of the European Technical Advisers Mission to Poland, and served as technical adviser to the Polish Minister of Railways in Warsaw, Poland. It was during this period, on January 26, 1920, that he resigned from the Army. His work during and after World War I brought him citations from the American Expeditionary Forces General Headquarters and decorations from the French, Finnish, and Polish governments.

Barber established a reputation as a transportation expert during his service in France and Poland, leading to his selection as manager of the Transportation and Communication Department of the United States Chamber of Commerce in 1923. He served in this position until retiring in 1948, he became a staff director on the National Security Resources Board and then a transportation consultant for the Office of Defense Mobilization until retiring in 1957.

Barber died on September 16, 1961, and was buried in Arlington National Cemetery.

== Family ==
Barber married Lucy Clementine Lombardi on August 20, 1908, a marriage that lasted 53 years. They had three sons and a daughter who reached adult years. One of his sons, Cesar Lombardi Barber, married Elizabeth Duncan Putnam, the daughter of George R. Putnam, Commissioner of Lighthouses.

== Bibliography ==
- Report of European technical advisers mission to Poland, 1919–1922. New York: De Vinne Press. 1923.
