= Africa Progress Panel =

Switzerland-based foundation

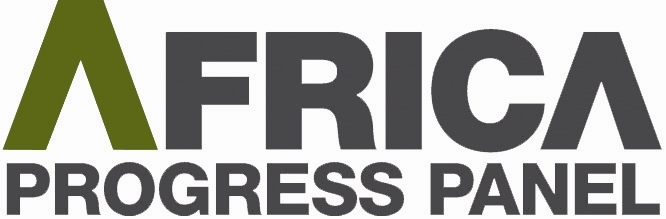
- Abbreviation: APP
- Successor: Africa Progress Group
- Formation: 2007
- Dissolved: 2017
- Type: Nonprofit
- Headquarters: Geneva, Switzerland
- Panel Chair: Kofi Annan
- Panel Members: Michel Camdessus, Peter Eigen, Bob Geldof, Graca Machel, Strive Masiyiwa, Linah Mohohlo, Olusegun Obasanjo, Robert Rubin, Tidjane Thiam
- Website: www.africaprogresspanel.org

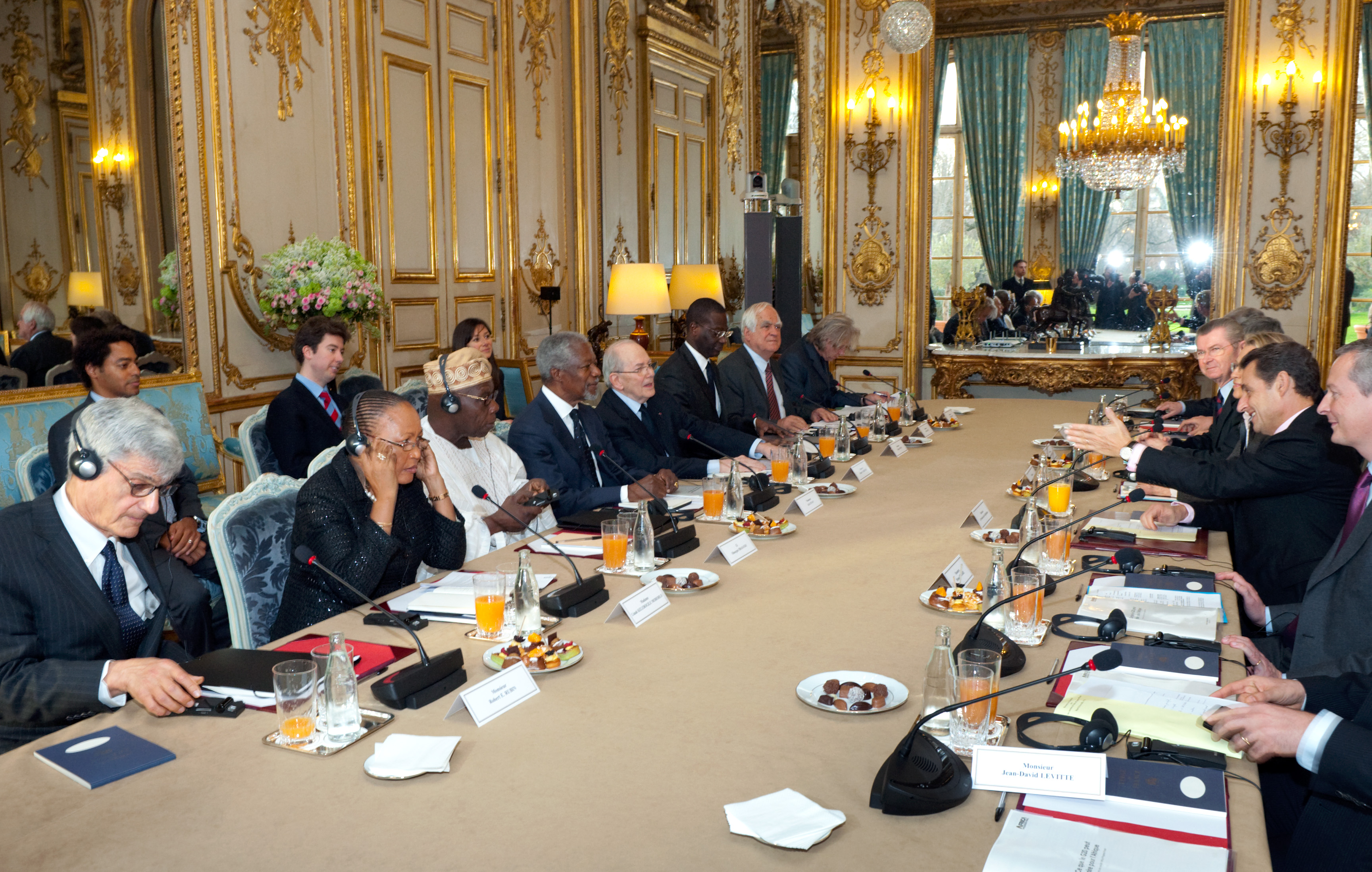
Panel members meeting with foreign dignitaries

The Africa Progress Panel (APP) was a Swiss-based foundation that was aimed at changing the policy through analysis, advocacy and diplomacy.

== History ==
After the Gleneagles G8 Summit in July 2005 and the Commission for Africa Report earlier that year, the Africa Progress Panel was formed through a UK Government initiative. Following the publication of the final report, the Panel reported that it had ceased its operations at the end of 2017.

== Structures ==
The panel was chaired by former United Nations Secretary-General Kofi Annan, and, during its existence, it consisted of the following members:

- Tony Blair – former Prime Minister of United Kingdom.
- Michel Camdessus – former Managing Director of the International Monetary Fund.
- Peter Eigen – founder and Chair of the Advisory Council at Transparency International.
- Bob Geldof – musician, founder, and Chair of Band Aid, Live Aid and Live 8, Co-founder of DATA.
- Graça Machel – President of the Foundation for Community Development.
- Strive Masiyiwa – founder of Econet Wireless.
- Linah Mohohlo – governor of Bank of Botswana.
- Olusegun Obasanjo – former President of Nigeria.
- Robert Rubin – Council on Foreign Relations and former Secretary of the United States Treasury.
- Tidjane Thiam – Chief Executive Officer, Crédit Suisse.

Timeline

The Geneva-based secretariat was a non-profit foundation under Swiss law. The Panel's work was supported by a secretariat established in 2008.

== Publications ==
=== Africa Progress Reports ===
The Africa Progress Reports were an annual publication of the Africa Progress Panel.

The 2012 Africa Progress Report was launched in London, United Kingdom, on 8 May 2014 by Kofi Annan, Tidjane Thiam, Bob Geldof, Peter Eigen, and Caroline Kende-Robb. The launch of the 2012 Africa Progress Report was covered by The Wall Street Journal, The Guardian, The Financial Times, and African Business. As part of the launch, Executive Director Caroline Kende-Robb and Panel Member Olusegun Obasanjo were interviewed for the video series This Is Africa.

The 2013 Africa Progress Report was launched at the World Economic Forum on Africa in Cape Town, South Africa, on 8 June 2013 by Kofi Annan, Linah Mohohlo, and Strive Masiyiwa. The 2015 Africa Progress Report was launched in Cape Town, South Africa, on 5 June 2015 by Caroline Kende-Robb, Graça Machel, Linah Mohohlo, and Michel Camdessus.
