= Lendwithcare =

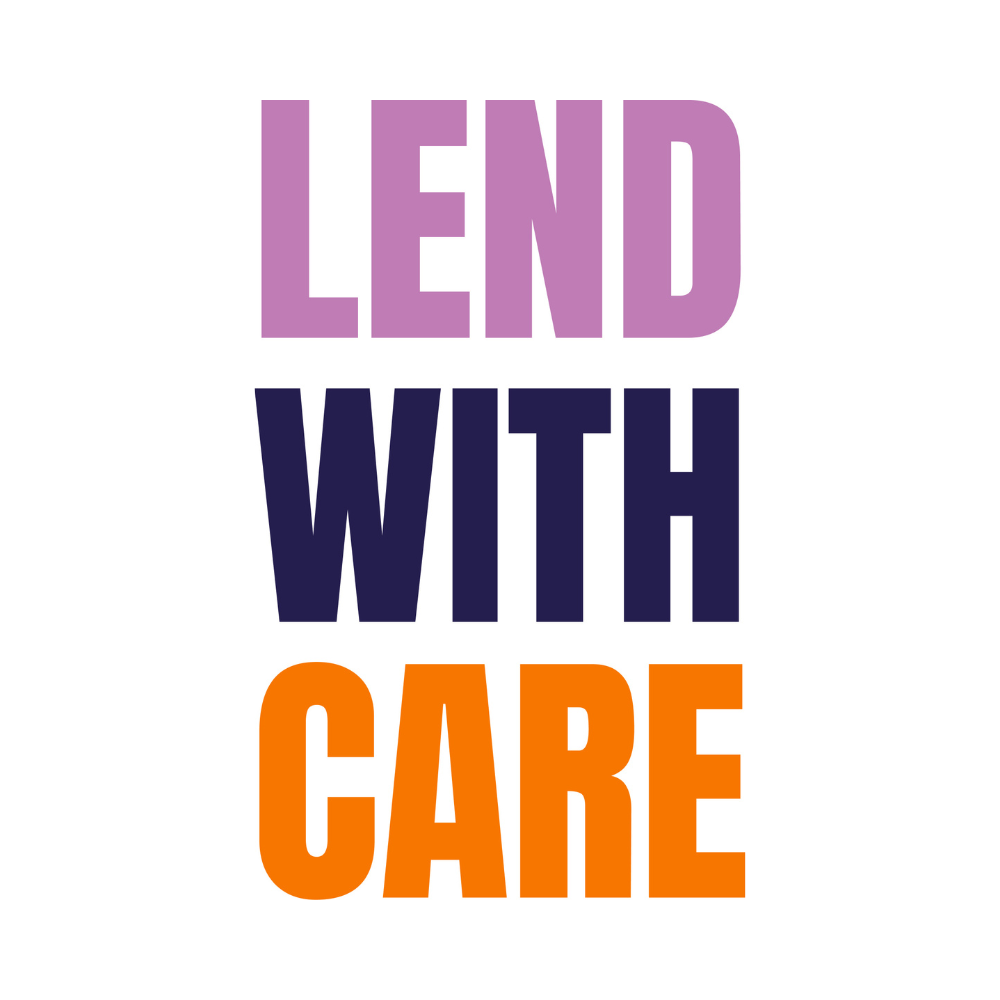
- Founded: April 2010; 16 years ago
- Founder: CARE
- Type: Non-profit organisation
- Purpose: Microfinance and microloans
- Location: London, United Kingdom
- Region served: Cambodia, Ecuador, Georgia, Malawi, Nicaragua, Paraguay, Pakistan, Palestine, Peru, Philippines, Rwanda, Senegal, Thailand, Togo, Vietnam and Zambia.
- Website: www.lendwithcare.org

Lendwithcare is a microfinance lending website from CARE International UK. Launched in September 2010, it allows individuals and groups to make small loans to entrepreneurs in low-income countries, helping them improve their lives through business.

As of January 2026, Lendwithcare supports entrepreneurs in Cambodia, Ecuador, Malawi, Nicaragua, Paraguay, Pakistan, Palestine, Philippines, Rwanda, Thailand, Togo, Vietnam, Kenya, Côte D'Ivoire and Zambia.

To provide this support, Lendwithcare works with a range of local development partners, many of which are specialist microfinance institutions. While Lendwithcare does not charge interest to make this funding available, some local partners working with Lendwithcare do charge interest to borrowers to cover their operational costs.

As of January 2026, over 90,000 individual lenders had provided over £60m in loan funding to over 200,000 small business owners.

== History ==
Lendwithcare was launched in September 2010.

In 2012, it launches a group lending feature, allowing individual lenders to lend as groups (such as churches or clubs) and track their impact together.

In 2021, Lendwithcare launches a grant funding feature, allowing users to make one-off grants in addition to loans. Unlike loans, these grants do not generate loan repayments. However, they do generate a positive impact on people's lives and reduce carbon dioxide emissions.

== The process ==
Lendwithcare works with a number of partner microfinance institutions in the countries in which it operates. If the microfinance institution is happy with an entrepreneur's idea or business plan, they approve the proposal and provide the initial loan requested. They also help the entrepreneur construct their profile for lendwithcare.org.

Lenders can browse the list of entrepreneurs on the website, read about their businesses, see the value of the loan they have requested, the percentage of the loan already provided by other lenders, and then choose an entrepreneur to lend to. Once the entrepreneur's loan is fully funded, the money is transferred to the microfinance institution to replace the initial loan already paid out to the entrepreneur. During this process lenders receive progress updates regarding the entrepreneur's progress. The entrepreneur gradually pays back their loan according to a repayment schedule. The microfinance institution transfers these repayments to CARE International who then credits the payment into lenders' lendwithcare.org accounts. Lenders can then either withdraw their money using a PayPal account or can use the credit to provide a loan to another entrepreneur.

== Partner microfinance institutions ==
Lendwithcare currently partners with 18 local development partners, including:

- Advans, Côte D'Ivoire
- Akhuwat Foundation, Pakistan
- Borvor, Cambodia
- Cooperativa Santa Anita, Ecuador
- Deki, Togo
- Doselva, Nicaragua
- FairClimateFund, Rwanda, India and Chad
- First Consolidated Cooperative along Tañon Seaboards, Philippines
- Fundación de Apoyo Comunitario y Social del Ecuador, Ecuador
- Fundación Paraguaya de Cooperación y Desarrollo, Paraguay
- LAMAC, Philippines
- MicroLoan Foundation, Zambia
- MicroLoan Foundation, Malawi
- Modern Farming Technologies, Malawi
- Reef Finance, The Palestinian Territories
- Small Enterprise Development, Thailand
- SolarAid, Zambia and Malawi
- Thanh Hoa Microfinance Institution, Vietnam
- U&I Microfinance Bank, Kenya
- Umutanguha, Rwanda

== Ambassadors ==
- Stacey Dooley travelled to Bosnia and Herzegovina in 2012.
- Deborah Meaden travelled to Cambodia in 2011.
- Alastair Stewart travelled to Bosnia and Herzegovina in 2011 to visit CARE's partner Zene za Zene. He met many entrepreneurs, including women widowed by Srebrenica massacre.
