= CARE International =

International humanitarian agency

- Founders: Arthur Cuming Ringland, Wallace Campbell, Lincoln Clark
- Type: International NGO
- Region served: Worldwide
- Fields: Humanitarian relief and development support
- Website: care-international.org

CARE (Cooperative for Assistance and Relief Everywhere, formerly Cooperative for American Remittances to Europe) is a major international humanitarian agency delivering emergency relief and long-term international development projects. Founded in 1945, CARE is nonsectarian, impartial, and non-governmental. It is one of the largest and oldest humanitarian aid organizations focused on fighting global poverty. In 2019, CARE reported working in 104 countries, supporting 1,349 poverty-fighting projects and humanitarian aid projects, and reaching over 92.3 million people directly and 433.3 million people indirectly.

CARE's programs in the developing world address a broad range of topics including emergency response, food security, water and sanitation, economic development, climate change, agriculture, education, and health. CARE also advocates at the local, national, and international levels for policy change and the rights of poor people. Within each of these areas, CARE focuses on empowering and meeting the needs of women and girls and promoting gender equality.

CARE International is a confederation of eighteen CARE national members, each of which is registered as an autonomous non-profit non-governmental organization in its own country, two candidate members and one affiliate member.

== History ==
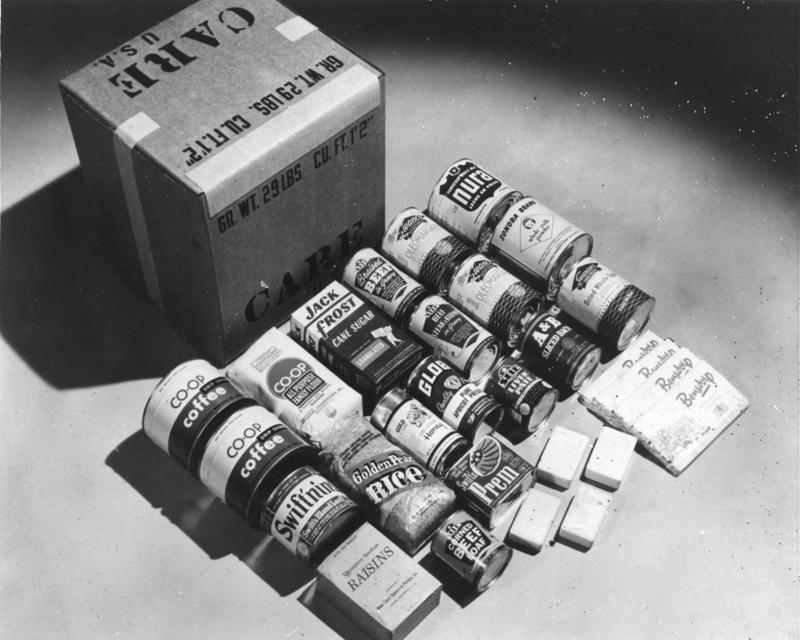
A CARE Package shipped in 1948

=== 1945–1949: Origins and the CARE Package ===
CARE, then the Cooperative for American Remittances to Europe, was formally founded on November 27, 1945, and was originally intended to be a temporary organization. Twenty-two members from the American Council of Voluntary Agencies for Foreign Service met to ratify the articles of incorporation for CARE to Europe. Churches, welfare organisations and trade unions were among the 22 founding members. World War II had ended in August of the same year. After pressure from the public and Congress, President Harry S. Truman agreed to let private organizations provide relief for those starving due to the war. CARE was initially a consortium of twenty-two U.S. charities (a mixture of civic, religious, cooperative, farm, and labour organizations) to deliver food aid to Europe in the aftermath of World War II. Donald M. Nelson was the first executive director, and William N. Haskell served as executive director from late 1945 until 1947. In February 1946, William N. Haskell wrote to Oskar Lange, the Polish ambassador in Washington, explaining the plan and asking for his assistance in obtaining the Polish government's consent to its extension to Poland. The organization delivered its first food packages in 1946.

CARE's food aid took the form of CARE Packages, which were at first delivered to specific individuals. Americans paid $10 to send a CARE Package of food to a loved one in Europe, often a family member. President Truman bought the first CARE package. CARE guaranteed delivery within four months to anyone in Europe, even if they had left their last known address, and returned a signed delivery receipt to the sender. As European postal services were unreliable at the time, these signed receipts were sometimes the first confirmation that the recipient had survived the war.

The first CARE Packages were, in fact, surplus "Ten-in-One" US army rations packs, designed to contain a day's meals for ten people. In early 1946, CARE purchased 2.8 million of these warehoused rations packs that were originally intended for the invasion of Japan, and began advertising in America. On May 11, 1946, the first CARE Packages were delivered in Le Havre, France. These packages contained staples such as canned meats, powdered milk, dried fruits, and fats, along with a few comfort items like chocolate, coffee, and cigarettes. Despite several members of the CARE Board of Directors wishing to remove the cigarettes, it was deemed impractical to open and reseal 2.8 million boxes. 1946 also marked CARE's first expansion out of the US, with the establishment of an office in Canada.

By early 1947, the supply of "Ten-in-One" ration packs had been exhausted, and CARE began assembling its own packages. These new packages were designed with the help of a nutritionist. They did not include cigarettes and were tailored for their destination. For instance, Kosher packages were developed, packages destined for the United Kingdom included tea rather than coffee, and packages for Italy included pasta. By 1949 CARE offered and shipped more than twelve different packages. From July 1948 to the present, CARE sent 100,000 packages to Japan.

Although the organization had originally intended to deliver packages to specified individuals, CARE began delivering packages addressed "to a teacher" or simply "to a hungry person in Europe" within a year. These unspecified donations continued, and in early 1948, the board of CARE voted narrowly to officially move towards unspecified donations and to expand into general relief. Some founding member agencies disagreed with this shift, arguing that general relief would be a duplication of the work of other agencies. Yet, donors reacted favorably and contributions increased, marking the beginning of CARE's shift towards a broader mandate.

Between the first deliveries in 1946 and the last deliveries in 1956, millions of CARE Packages were distributed throughout Europe, over 50% of them to Germany, including many delivered as part of the Berlin airlift in response to the 1948 Soviet blockade of Berlin. The Polish CARE Mission was formally closed by its head, George Goodfellow, on December 31, 1949. During CARE's activity in Poland from May 1946 to December 1949, it delivered 201,872 packages valued at $2,067,528.5.

The US Agricultural Act of 1949 made surplus American agricultural products available for shipment abroad as aid, either directly by the US government, or by NGOs, including CARE. In 1954, Public Law 480, also known as the Food for Peace Act, further expanded the availability of surplus food as aid. This act allowed CARE to expand its feeding programs and disaster relief operations considerably. Between 1949 and 2009, CARE used hundreds of millions of dollars' worth of surplus commodities in disaster relief and programs such as school lunch provision.

=== 1949–1956: Transition out of Europe ===
Although the organization's mission had originally been focused on Europe, CARE opened its first non-European mission in Japan, in July 1948. Deliveries to China and Korea followed, which CARE described as aid to areas "implicated by WWII". In 1949, CARE entered the developing world for the first time, launching programs in the Philippines, with projects in India, Pakistan, and Mexico beginning soon after. In the same year, CARE expanded into non-food aid with the development of "self-help" packages containing tools for farming, carpentry, and other trades. In 1953, as a result of its expansion to projects outside Europe, CARE changed the meaning of its acronym to "Cooperative for American Remittances to Everywhere".

As Europe recovered economically, CARE faced the need to re-evaluate its mission: in 1955, several board members argued that CARE's mandate was finished with the European post-war recovery, and that the organization should dissolve. Other Board members, however, felt that CARE's mission should continue, albeit with a new focus on the developing world. Paul French, CARE's executive director at the time, resigned over the debate. New executive director Richard W. Reuter took over in 1955 and helped lead the organization in a new direction. In July 1955, the Board of Directors voted to continue and expand CARE projects outside Europe. Twenty-two of CARE's forty-two missions were closed, mostly in European countries, and efforts were concentrated on food distribution and emergency response in the developing world. In 1956, CARE distributed food to refugees of the Hungarian Revolution of 1956, which would be among the last of CARE's operations in Europe for many years.

=== 1957–1975: Transition into broader development work ===
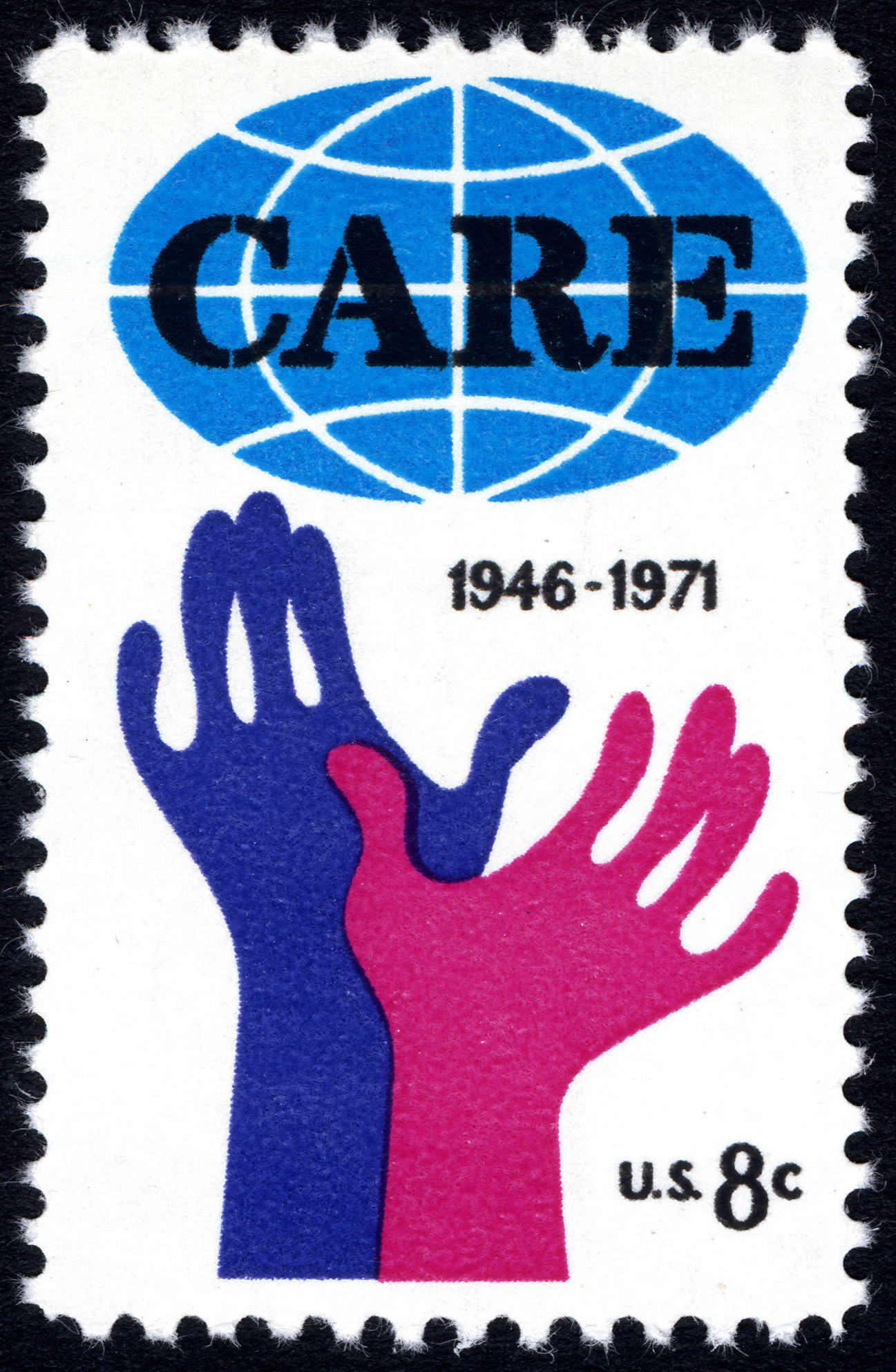
CARE commemorative U.S. stamp

With a broadened geographic focus came a broadened approach, as CARE began to expand beyond its original food distribution program. In order to reflect these new broader aims, in 1959 CARE changed the meaning of its acronym a second time, becoming the "Cooperative for American Relief Everywhere". Reflecting this broadened scope, CARE became involved in 1961 with President John F. Kennedy's establishment of the Peace Corps. CARE was tasked with selecting and training the first group of volunteers, who would later be deployed to development projects in Colombia. The Peace Corps assumed greater control over the training of Peace Corps Volunteers in subsequent missions, but CARE continued to provide country directors to the Peace Corps until CARE-Peace Corps joint projects ended in 1967.

In 1962, CARE merged with and absorbed the medical aid organization MEDICO, with which it had previously worked closely. The merger considerably increased CARE's capacity to deliver health programs, including trained medical personnel and supplies.

During this transition, the original CARE Package was phased out. The last food package was delivered in 1967, and the last tools package in 1968. Over 100 million CARE Packages had been delivered worldwide since the first shipment to France. Although 1968 marked the official "retirement" of the CARE Package, the format would occasionally be used again, for example, in CARE's relief to the republics of the former Soviet Union and to survivors of the Bosnian War. The concept was also revived in 2011 as an online campaign encouraging donors to fill a "virtual CARE Package" with food aid and services, such as education and healthcare.

1967 also marked CARE's first partnership agreement with a government for the construction of schools in Honduras. Partnership agreements with governments led CARE's missions to become country-wide rather than targeted to specific communities. During this era, missions focused largely on the construction of schools and the continued distribution of food. In particular, nutrition centers would become one of CARE's major areas of concentration, supporting school feeding programs and nutrition education for new mothers.

In 1975, CARE implemented a multi-year planning system, allowing its programs to become both broader and deeper in scope. Projects became increasingly multi-faceted, providing, for example, access to clean water and an agricultural program to improve nutrition, as well as health education. A 1977 project provided for the construction of over 200 pre-schools and kindergartens throughout Chile over several years, jointly funded by CARE and the Chilean Ministry of Education.

=== 1975–1990: From CARE to CARE International ===
Although CARE had opened an office in Canada in 1946, it was not until the mid-1970s that the organization truly started to become an international body. CARE Canada (initially Care of Canada) became an autonomous body in 1973. In 1976, CARE Europe was established in Bonn following the successful fund-raising campaign "Dank an CARE" (Thanks to CARE). In 1981, CARE Germany was created and CARE Europe moved its headquarters to Paris. CARE Norway had been created in 1980, and CAREs in Italy and the UK were established. The popularity of CARE offices in Europe was attributed to the fact that many Europeans remembered receiving CARE assistance between 1945 and 1955.

In 1979, planning began for the establishment of an umbrella organization to coordinate and prevent duplication among the various national CARE organizations. This new body was named CARE International and met for the first time on January 29, 1982, with CARE Canada, CARE Germany, CARE Norway, and CARE USA (formerly simply CARE) in attendance.

CARE International expanded significantly during the 1980s, with the addition of CARE France in 1983, CARE UK in 1985, CARE Austria in 1986, and CARE Australia, CARE Denmark, and CARE Japan in 1987.

=== 1990–present: Recent history ===
In the 1980s and early 1990s, CARE's projects focused particularly on agroforestry initiatives, such as reforestation and soil conservation in eastern Africa and South America, along with broader development work. CARE also responded to a number of major emergencies during this period, notably the 1983–1985 famine in Ethiopia and the 1991–1992 famine in Somalia.

The 1990s also saw an evolution in CARE's approach to poverty. Originally, CARE had viewed poverty primarily as a lack of basic goods and services such as food, clean water, and health care. As CARE's scope expanded geographically and thematically, the organization adopted the view that poverty was caused by social exclusion, marginalization, and discrimination. In the early 1990s, CARE adopted a household livelihood security framework, which viewed poverty as encompassing not only physical resources, but also social position and personal abilities. As a result of this, CARE had adopted a rights-based approach to development by 2000.

During the September 2016 Kabul attacks, one of CARE's buildings was attacked with a car bomb, leaving six people wounded. In the 2021 Fall of Kabul after the withdrawal of American troops, CARE's deputy country director Marianne O'Grady said that women would continue educating their families and neighbors despite Taliban rules, even 'behind the walls'.

==== Microfinance ====
In the early 1990s, CARE also developed what would become an important model for cooperative microfinance. The Village Savings and Loans Associations (VSLAs) began in 1991 as a pilot project called Mata Masu Dubara, run by CARE's Country Office in Niger. CARE Niger developed the model by adapting Accumulating Savings and Credit Associations. The VSLA model involves groups of 15–30 people who regularly save and borrow using a group fund. Member savings create capital that can be used for short-term loans, and both capital and interest are shared among the group at the end of a given period (usually about a year), at which point the groups normally re-form to begin a new cycle. As the bookkeeping required to manage a Village Savings and Loans Association is quite simple, most groups successfully become independent within a year and enjoy a high rate of long-term group survival. CARE has created over 40,000 Village Savings and Loans Associations (over 1 million members total) across Africa, Asia, and Latin America, and in 2008, launched Access Africa, which aims to extend Village Savings and Loans Association training to 39 African countries by 2018. This model has also been widely replicated in Africa and Asia by other large NGOs including Oxfam, Plan International, and Catholic Relief Services. CARE UK later launched lendwithcare.org, which allows members of the public to make microloans, including green loans, to entrepreneurs in Africa and Asia.

==== Acronym redefinition and 50th anniversary ====
In 1993, CARE changed the meaning of its acronym for a third time, adopting its current name, the "Cooperative for Assistance and Relief Everywhere" to reflect its international organizational structure. CARE also marked its 50th anniversary in 1994.

CARE expanded the confederation to twelve members in the early 2000s, with CARE Netherlands (formerly the Disaster Relief Agency) joining in 2001, and CARE Thailand (called the Raks Thai Foundation) joining in 2003, becoming the first CARE National Member in a developing country.

CARE's well-known "I am Powerful" campaign launched in the US in September 2006 in order to bring public attention to the organization's long-standing focus on women's empowerment. CARE states that its programs focus on women and girls both because the world's poor are disproportionately female and because women's empowerment is thought to be an important driver of development. CARE also emphasizes that it considers working with boys and men an important part of women's empowerment, and that women's empowerment benefits both genders.

In 2007, CARE announced that it would no longer accept certain types of US food aid, worth some $45 million a year, by 2009. The organization argued that these types of food aid are inefficient and harmful to local markets. Specifically, CARE announced that it would forego all monetized food aid, as well as all food aid intended to establish a commercial advantage for the donor. Instead, it would increase its commitment to buying food aid locally. CARE also announced that it would no longer accept USDA food through Title 1 concessional sales or Section 416 (surplus disposal), as these programs are intended to establish a commercial advantage for US agriculture.

In 2011, CARE added its first affiliate member, CARE India, and in 2012, the CARE International (CI) board accepted CARE Peru as CARE's second affiliate member. CARE India became a full member in November 2013. CARE Peru became a full member of the confederation in June 2015.

CARE is currently one of the only major NGOs to make their database of project evaluations publicly available, and to regularly conduct a meta-analysis of evaluation methodologies and overall organizational impact.

== Structure ==
CARE International is a confederation of eighteen national members, two candidate members, and one affiliate member as of July 2024. It is coordinated by the CARE international secretariat, which is based in Geneva, Switzerland, with offices in New York City and in Brussels to liaise with the United Nations and European institutions, respectively.

Each CARE national member is an autonomous non-governmental organization registered in the country, and runs programs, fundraising, and communications activities in its own country and in developing countries that CARE operates in. The members are:

CARE national, candidate and affiliate members
Member	Type	Joined the confederation as of:	Website
CARE Australia	N	1987	care.org.au
CARE Canada	N	1946	care.ca
CARE Caucasus	C	2021	care-caucasus.org.ge
CARE Czech Republic	C	2021	care.cz
Chrysalis Sri Lanka	A	2017	chrysaliscatalyz.com
CARE Danmark	N	1987	care.dk
CARE Deutschland	N	1981	care.de
CARE Egypt Foundation	N	2022	care.org.eg
CARE France	N	1983	carefrance.org
CARE India	N	2011	
Yayasan CARE Peduli (Indonesia)	N	2023	careindonesia.or.id
CARE Japan	N	1987	careintjp.org
CARE Luxemburg	N	2022	care.lu
CARE Maroc	N	2023	caremaroc.org
CARE Nederland	N	2001	carenederland.org
CARE Norge	N	1980	care.no
CARE Österreich	N	1986	care.at
CARE Peru	N	2012	care.org.pe
Raks Thai Foundation (Thailand)	N	2003	raksthai.org
CARE UK	N	1985	careinternational.org.uk
CARE USA (founding member: originally simply CARE)	N	1945	care.org

National members are shown as type "N", candidate members as type "C", and affiliate members as type "A".

== Programming scope ==
In 2016 CARE was active in the following countries (as well as in member and affiliate countries):

Areas where CARE was active in 2014
Region	Countries
Asia-Pacific	Afghanistan, Australia, Fiji, Nepal, Bangladesh, Pakistan, Cambodia, Papua New Guinea, Philippines, India, Sri Lanka, Indonesia, Thailand, Laos, Timor-Leste, Japan, Vanuatu, Myanmar, and Vietnam
East and Central Africa	Burundi, Democratic Republic of the Congo, Ethiopia, Kenya, Rwanda, Somalia, South Sudan, Sudan, Tanzania, and Uganda
Latin America and Caribbean	Bolivia, Guatemala, Brazil, Dominican Republic, Haiti, Cuba, Honduras, Ecuador, Nicaragua, El Salvador, Honduras, Panama, Peru, and Mexico
Middle East, North Africa and Europe	Albania, Armenia, Austria, Azerbaijan, Belgium, Bosnia and Herzegovina, Croatia, Czech Republic, Denmark, Egypt, France, Georgia, Germany, Iraq, Jordan, Kosovo, Lebanon, Luxemburg, Macedonia, Montenegro, Morocco, Netherlands, Norway, Romania, Serbia, Switzerland, Syria, Turkey, United Arab Emirates, United Kingdom, West Bank and Gaza, and Yemen
North America	Canada and the United States of America
Southern Africa	Madagascar, Malawi, Mozambique, Zambia, and Zimbabwe
West Africa	Benin, Burkina Faso, Cameroon, Chad, Côte d'Ivoire, Ghana, Guinea, Liberia, Mali, Niger, Senegal, Sierra Leone, and Togo

A total of 962 development and humanitarian aid projects were carried out in these countries, with 80,120,323 million people directly reached. The breakdown by region was as follows:

CARE projects by region
Region	Direct participants	Projects
East and Central Africa	9,086,533	200
Latin America and Caribbean	965,705	93
Middle East, North Africa and Europe	3,616,754	194
Asia and the Pacific	56,738,386	329
Southern Africa	4,640,456	80
West Africa	5,072,468	137

For the fiscal year 2016, CARE reported a budget of more than 574 million Euros and a staff of 9,175 (94% of them local citizens of the country where they work).

=== Emergency response ===
CARE supports emergency relief as well as prevention, preparedness, and recovery programs. In 2016, CARE reportedly reached more than 7.2 million people through its humanitarian response. CARE's core sectors for emergency response are Food Security, Shelter, WASH and Sexual & Reproductive Health. CARE is a signatory of major international humanitarian standards and codes of conduct, including the Code of Conduct for the International Red Cross and Red Crescent Movement, and NGOs in Disaster Relief, the Sphere standards, and the Humanitarian Accountability Partnership (HAP) principles and standards.

== Networks and partnerships ==
CARE is a signatory to the following standards of humanitarian intervention: the Code of Conduct for The International Red Cross and Red Crescent Movement and NGOs in Disaster Relief, the Sphere standards, and the Core Humanitarian Standard. Also, CARE is a member of a number of networks aiming to improve the quality and coordination of humanitarian aid: The Emergency Capacity Building Project, The Consortium of British Humanitarian Agencies, the Active Learning Network for Accountability and Performance in Humanitarian Action, the Steering Committee for Humanitarian Response, the International Council for Voluntary Agencies, and the INGO Accountability Charter. CARE also regularly engages in joint advocacy campaigns with other major NGOs, such as The Global Campaign for Climate Change Action.

== List of secretaries general ==
Secretaries general of CARE, by term
Date	Name
2025–	Reintje van Haeringen
2020–2024	Sofía Sprechmann Sineiro
2019–2020	Lindsay Glassco
2018–2019	Caroline Kende-Robb
2018	Laurie Lee (interim)
