= Jacques de Larosière =

French civil servant, former IMF managing director (born 1929)

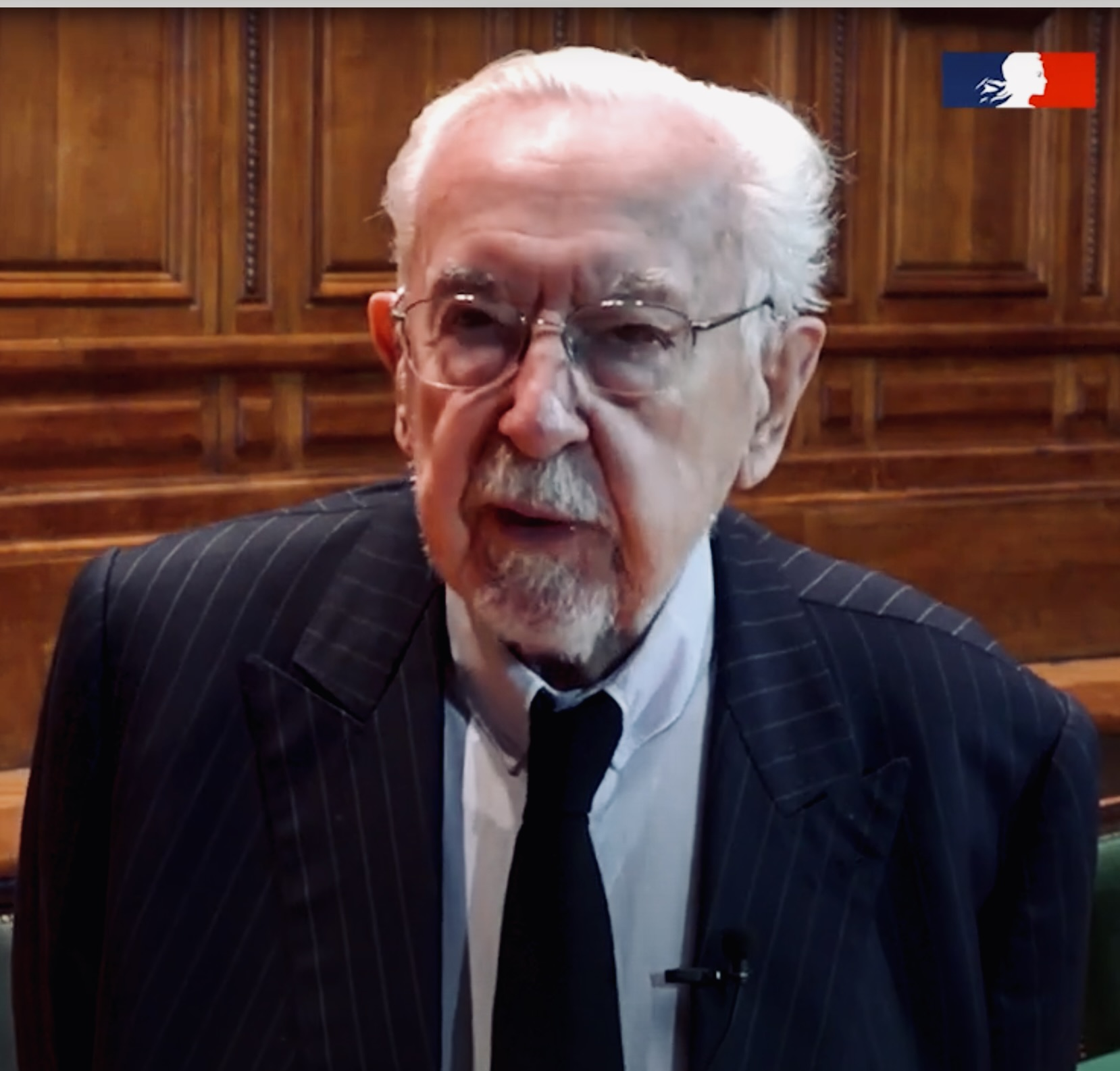
- De Larosière in 2024

President of the European Bank for Reconstruction and Development
- In office September 1993 – January 1998
- Preceded by: Jacques Attali
- Succeeded by: Horst Köhler

Governor of the Bank of France
- In office 15 January 1987 – 16 January 1993
- Preceded by: Michel Camdessus
- Succeeded by: Jean-Claude Trichet

Managing Director of the International Monetary Fund
- In office 17 June 1978 – 15 January 1987
- Preceded by: Johan Witteveen
- Succeeded by: Michel Camdessus

Director of the Treasury
- In office 1974–1978
- Preceded by: Claude Pierre-Brossolette
- Succeeded by: Jean-Yves Haberer

Personal details
- Born: Jacques Martin Henri de Larosière de Champfeu; 12 November 1929 (age 96) Paris, France
- Education: Lycée Louis-le-Grand
- Alma mater: Sciences Po; École nationale d'administration
- Profession: Civil servant

Jacques Martin Henri de Larosière de Champfeu (French pronunciation: [ʒak də laʁozjɛʁ də ʃɑ̃fø]; born 12 November 1929) is a French retired senior civil servant who served as the president of the European Bank for Reconstruction and Development from 1993 to 1998. He previously served as the Governor of the Bank of France from 1987 to 1993. Before that appointment, he was the sixth managing director of the International Monetary Fund (IMF) from 1978 to 1987.

== Early life and education ==
De Larosière descends from Joseph Thebaud. He studied at Lycée Louis-le-Grand and Institut d'Études Politiques de Paris. He graduated from École nationale d'administration in 1958 and entered the elite French Finance Ministry internal inspectorate known as the Inspection générale des finances.

== Career ==
=== Career in government ===
From 1965 to 1974, de Larosière worked at the Directorate of the Treasury within the French Finance Ministry. He then briefly joined the private office (cabinet) of Finance Minister Valéry Giscard d'Estaing, and following the latter election as French President, was appointed Director of the French Treasury in 1974, a position he held for the next four years.

=== Career in international finance ===
De Larosière served as the Managing Director of the International Monetary Fund (IMF) from 17 June 1978 to 15 January 1987.

From 1987 to 1993 he was the Governor of the Banque de France.

After successfully competing against Giuliano Amato, Leszek Balcerowicz and Henning Christophersen to become the European Union's nominee for the post, de Larosière became President of the London-based European Bank for Reconstruction and Development in September 1993. His appointment came in the wake of the scandals that led to the departure of the EBRD's first president, Jacques Attali. He left this position in 1998 after restoring the bank's reputation and credibility.

=== Later career ===
In 1992 Larosière became a member of the Washington-based Group of Thirty. In 2000 he co-created Eurofi and became its co-chair together with Daniel Lebègue, then sole chair from 2011 to 2016.

In the wake of the Bankruptcy of Lehman Brothers, European Commission President José Manuel Barroso asked de Larosière to lead a high-level group that in February 2009 produced a landmark report, known as the "De Larosière Report" and recommending a broad overhaul of the European Union financial regulatory architecture. The Report's suggestions were adopted in EU legislation enacted in 2010 that created the European Banking Authority, the European Insurance and Occupational Pensions Authority, the European Securities and Markets Authority, and the European Systemic Risk Board.

As of 2021 he remains Chairman of the Strategic Committee of the French debt management office, the Agence France Trésor, and advisor to BNP Paribas.

== Honours ==
=== National ===
- Grand Cross of the Legion of Honour (2025)
- Grand Cross of the Ordre national du Mérite (2018)

=== Foreign ===
- Order of the Cross of Terra Mariana, 2nd Class
- Honorary Knight Commander of the Most Excellent Order of the British Empire

== See also ==
- Delors Committee

Government offices
Preceded by Johan Witteveen	Head of the International Monetary Fund; 1978–1987	Succeeded by Michel Camdessus
Preceded by Michel Camdessus	Governor of the Bank of France; 1987–1993	Succeeded by Jean-Claude Trichet
Preceded by Jacques Attali	President of the European Bank for Reconstruction and Development; 1993–1998	Succeeded by Horst Köhler
