= CARE Peru =

Humanitarian agency based in Peru

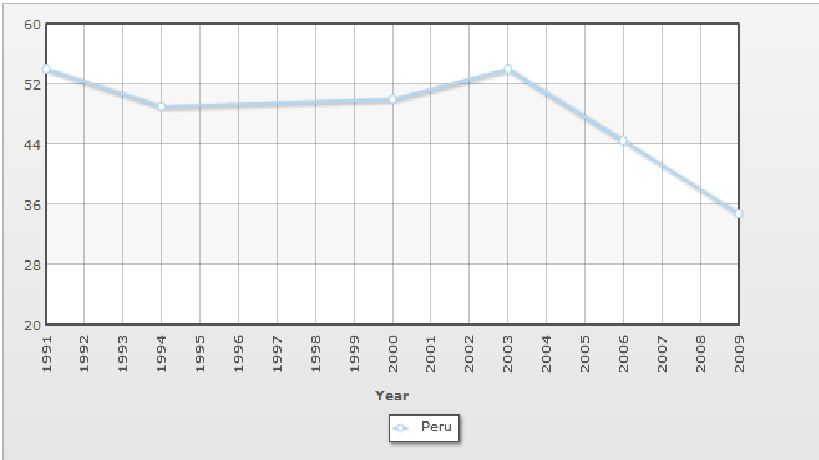
Population below poverty line (%)

CARE Peru resumed work in 1970. Today, CARE’s programs focus on assisting the Millennium Development Goals (MDG). CARE Peru's contributions were mainly through education, health care, access to safe water, reduction in poverty and hunger. CARE works with the poorest 20% of the population to reduce inequality.

Programs have been put in place to achieve their mission. Small Economic Activity Development (SEAD) creates income opportunities and increase economic security for those disadvantage people. SEAD assists them through granting access to business and financial training and resources. This includes access to savings and credits, training and financial services. The emphasis on these programs has centered on organizations of small producers, to build up solidarity among them and their capacity for negotiating with others. They have also promoted alliances with business sectors with corporate social responsibility initiatives.

In addition, CARE has also allowed producer families to gain access to credit to assist them in increasing production and gaining access to markets. 50% of this grant will be used to serve as finance cost to these farmers as loans while the rest will finance the cost of linking them to markets. In addition, another project will be targeting small organic cocoa producers to sustain their income and employment with the purpose of reducing income poverty of 1,000 cocoa producers. They will be assisted by strengthening their productivity through management and technical skills. 266 jobs will be created for this project and 199 after the project excluding the 120 technical assistance jobs.

One of the biggest impediments in overcoming income poverty for the poor is the access to credit in line with their characteristics and capacity. In 1998, CARE Peru assisted with the establishment of EDYFICAR, a financial entity to provide financial services to low-income sectors. In 2007, the Inter-American Development Bank ranked EDYFICAR ninth among the top 100 micro-finance institutions in Latin America. In 2009, its portfolio reached US$194 million, serving people in 13 regions in Peru. Also, the Banco de Crédito del Perú – the largest bank in the country – managed to acquire the majority stake in EDYFICAR. Since then, it has operated under the model of financial services aimed at the lowest income segments of the population.

CARE and its partners have also influenced decision-makers in the public sector. For example CARE and the Ministry of Agriculture demonstrated that small farmers with less than 3 hectares of land could be linked to existing markets, and therefore should be included in the compensation program that the government established after signing the Free Trade Agreement with the United States.

Between 2005 and 2010, CARE worked with 58,570 households in the poorest and most excluded highland regions of the country, contributing to reduce the percentage of the population living with less than US$1 per day from 84% to 63%. Statistic from National Institute of Statistics and Information showed that the percentage of poor Peru has dropped from 54.8% in 2001 to 31.3% in 2010 and poverty has fallen by 23.5 percentage points over the last decade.

== See also ==
- CARE (relief agency)
