= Linah Mohohlo =

Botswana banker (1952–2021)

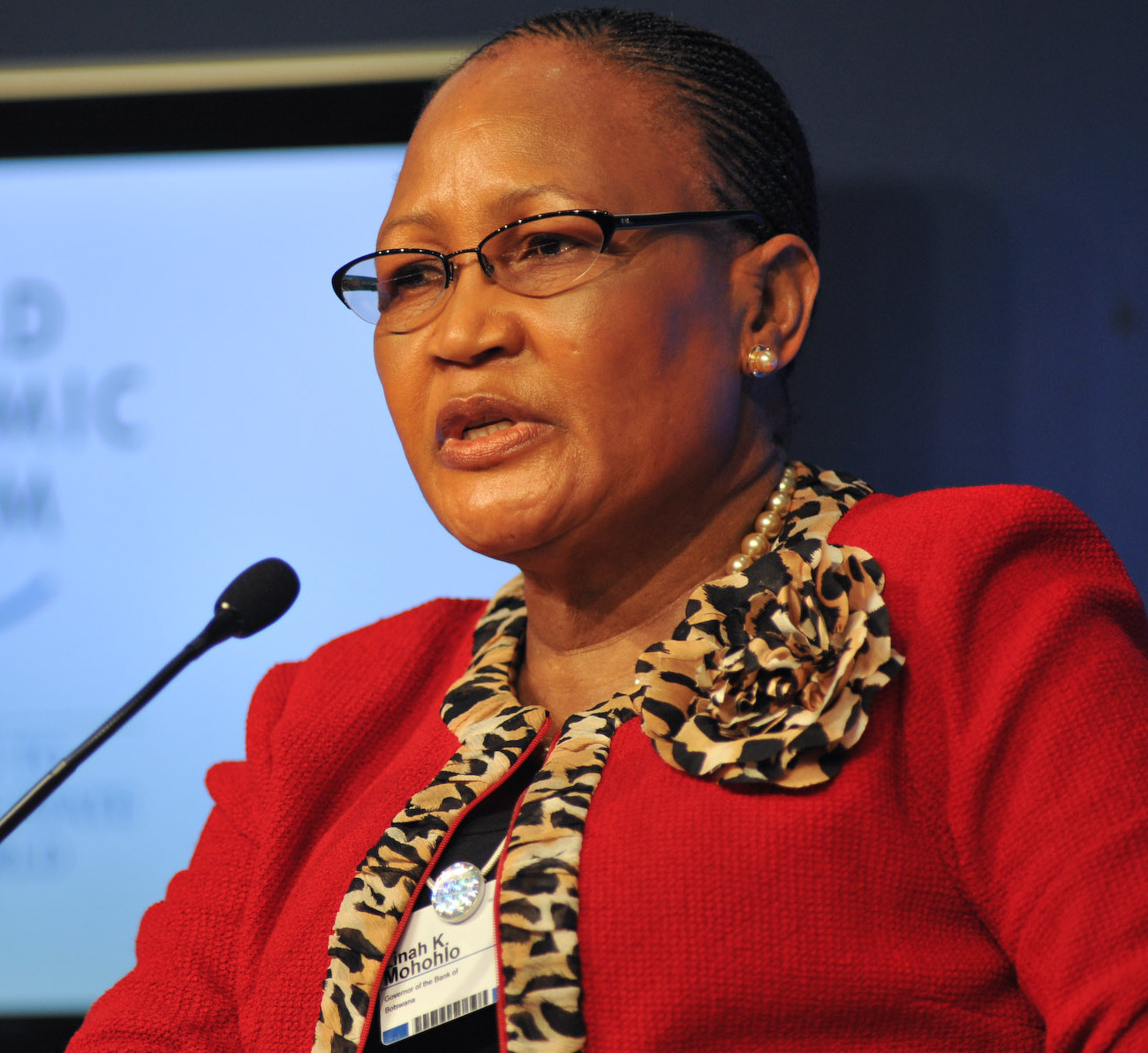

Chancellor of the University of Botswana
- In office 2017–2021

Governor of the Bank of Botswana
- In office 1999–2016

Personal details
- Born: 13 February 1952
- Died: 2 June 2021 (aged 69)

Linah Kelebogile Mohohlo (13 February 1952 – 2 June 2021) was a Botswana banker and university chancellor. She was the first female Governor of the Bank of Botswana from 1999 to 2016. She was also the first female Chancellor of the University of Botswana, serving from 2017 to 2021.

Mohohlo was a member of the Commission for Africa. She was also part of the Africa Progress Panel (APP), a group of ten individuals who advocate for equitable and sustainable development in Africa.

== Education ==
Mohohlo was born on 13 February 1952. She completed a diploma in accounting and business at the University of Botswana, a bachelor's degree in economics at George Washington University,and a master's degree in finance and investment at University of Exeter. She also took part in an executive management programme at Yale University.

== Career ==
Mohohlo was the Governor of the Bank of Botswana from 1999 to 2016, following a 23-year career with the Bank, during which she worked in support and policy areas (e.g. Board Secretariat, Human Resources, Research and Financial Markets Departments). She has also worked for the International Monetary Fund (IMF) as a Special Appointee. In her capacity as Governor of the IMF for Botswana, she was a member of the International Monetary and Financial Committee (IMFC: 2000-02), representing the Africa Group 1 Constituency, which comprises 21 Sub-Saharan African countries.

In addition to having been a member of the inaugural Botswana Economic and Advisory Council, Mohohlo served on boards of major corporations in Botswana and abroad. Among her several international engagements, she was appointed Eminent Person in 2002 by the former Secretary General of the United Nations Kofi Annan, charged with the responsibility of overseeing the evaluation of the United Nations New Agenda for the Development of Africa in the 1990s. She also served as a member of the Commission for Africa that was chaired by the former UK Prime Minister Tony Blair; the Commission's Report, “Our Common Interest”, was published in 2005. Mohohlo was a member of the Bill & Melinda Gates Foundation’s Committee on Financial Services for the poor. She sat in the Investment Committee of the United Nations Joint Staff Pension Fund and has co-chaired the meeting of the World Economic Forum for Africa in Cape Town in May 2011.

Mohohlo was also a member of the Africa Progress Panel (APP), a group of ten distinguished individuals who advocate at the highest levels for equitable and sustainable development in Africa. Every year, the Panel releases a report, the Africa Progress Report, that outlines an issue of immediate importance to the continent and suggests a set of associated policies. In 2012, the Africa Progress Report highlighted issues of Jobs, Justice, and Equity. The 2013 report outlined issues relating to oil, gas, and mining in Africa.

In May 2015, United Nations Secretary-General Ban Ki-moon appointed Mohohlo as member of the High-Level Panel on Humanitarian Financing, an initiative aimed at preparing recommendations for the 2016 World Humanitarian Summit. In 2021, she was appointed to the World Health Organization's Council on the Economics of Health For All, chaired by Mariana Mazzucato.

In July 2017, Tlou Energy Limited, the AIM and ASX listed company focused on delivering power in Botswana and southern Africa through the development of coal bed methane ("CBM"), announced that the Company had appointed Mohohlo to the Board as a Non-Executive Director.

Mohohlo has authored and published several papers and book chapters in economics, finance/investments, reserves management and governance.

== Awards and recognition ==
- Mohohlo was awarded the prestigious title of “Central Bank Governor of the Year (2001) for Africa and the Middle East Region” by the Financial Times Magazine, The Banker.
- Mohohlo received special recognition for outstanding achievement “Social Responsibility Award” by Zenith Bank. She was also recognized as the Banking Regulator of the Year by both the Intercontinental Bank and Fidelity Bank, 2008.

== Death ==
Mohohlo died from COVID-19 complications at the age of 69 on 2 June 2021, in Gaborone during the COVID-19 pandemic in Botswana.

== Bibliography ==
=== Publications ===
- Linah K Mohohlo: Liquidity conditions in Botswana banks Speech by Ms Linah K Mohohlo, Governor of the Bank of Botswana, at the press briefing on banks' liquidity condition, Gaborone, 26 March 2015.
- Linah K Mohohlo: The role of information technology in domestic economic development and regional integration - opportunities and related challenges Speech by Ms Linah K Mohohlo, Governor of the Bank of Botswana, at the Gala Dinner of the SWIFT 2013 Africa Regional Conference, Gaborone, 22 May 2013.
- Linah K Mohohlo: Developing and diversifying Botswana's banking sector Keynote speech by Ms Linah K Mohohlo, Governor of the Bank of Botswana, at the official launch of Bank of India (Botswana) Limited, Gaborone, 9 August 2013.
- Linah K Mohohlo: 2010 Monetary Policy Statement Speech by Mrs Linah K Mohohlo, Governor of the Bank of Botswana, at the launch of the Monetary Policy Statement for 2010, Gaborone, 25 February 2010.
- Linah K Mohohlo: Botswana's Monetary Policy Statement for 2012 Remarks by Ms Linah K Mohohlo, Governor of the Bank of Botswana, at the launch of the Monetary Policy Statement for 2012, Gaborone, 20 February 2012.
- Mohohlo, L. K. (2015). Africa Academy of Management 2nd Biennial Conference at the University of Botswana, Gaborone “Sustainable Development in Africa through Management Theory, Research and Practice” Official Opening. Africa Journal of Management, 1(1), 89-93. https://doi.org/10.1080/23322373.2015.994427
- Mohohlo, L. K. (2008). Monetary Policy Statement-2008. Bank of Botswana
