= Arthur Cuming Ringland =

Conservationist and co-founder of CARE (1882 – 1981)

Arthur Ringland (September 29, 1882 – October 12, 1981) is known as the principal founder of CARE, a humanitarian organization based in Geneva, Switzerland.

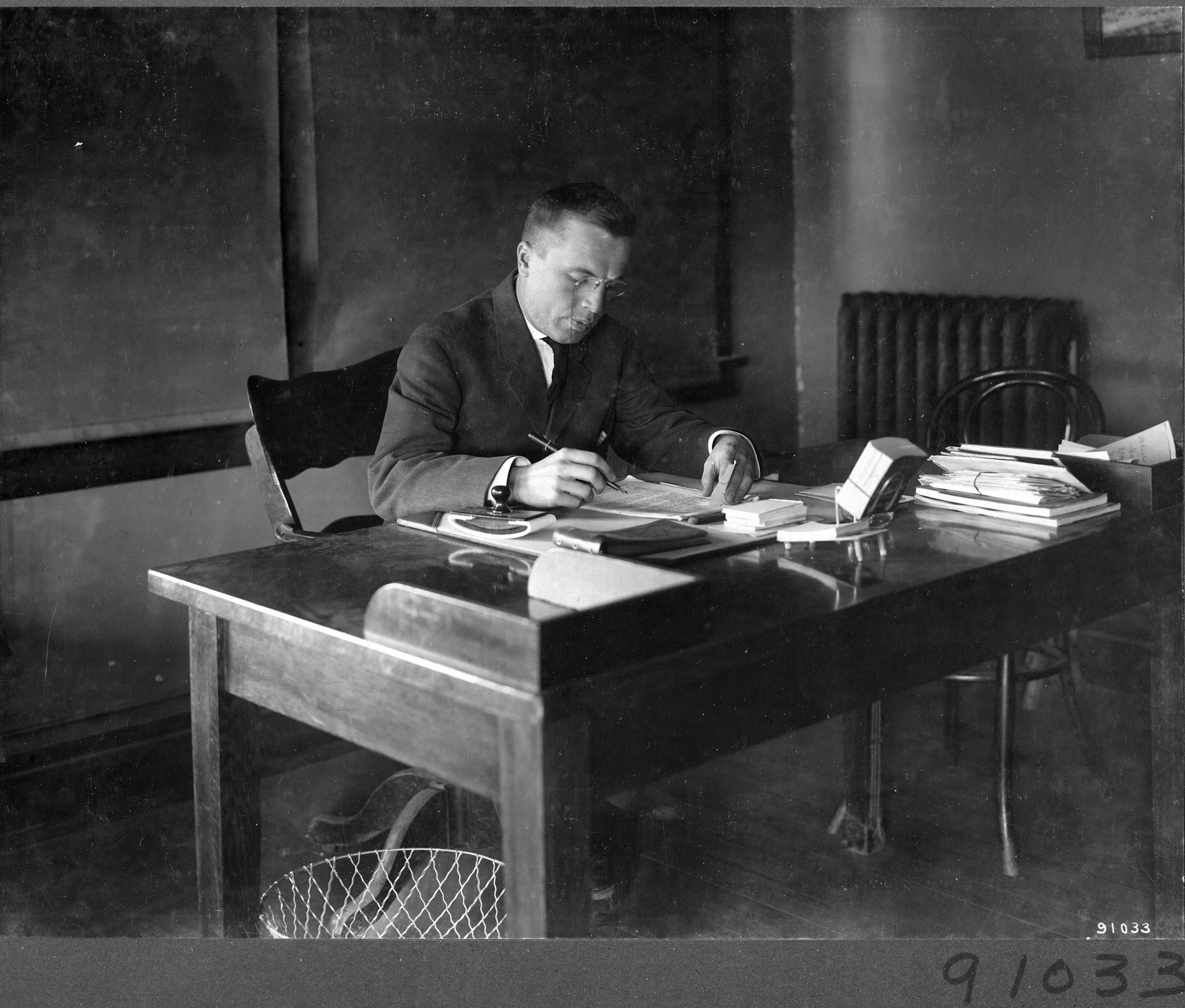
Ringland while working for the Forest Service

== Career ==
Ringland began his lifelong government career in 1900 when he joined the U.S. Forest Service where he helped establish the national park and national forest system. Between 1900 and 1945, Arthur Ringland led a variety of government programs that ranged from conservation work to refugee relief. In 1945, he originated the concept of the private voluntary organization that became CARE. A principal aspect of that work was persuading the government to provide ships to transport food packages that had been donated for the needy in Europe. He thus became known as "the father of CARE," and was honored for his efforts by the United Nations in 1958.

Ringland was born in Brooklyn, New York, on September 29, 1882. He received his master's degree in forestry at the Sheffield School of Science, Yale University in 1905. He entered Federal forest work while still a student in 1900. His obituary notes he was 99 when he died.

In 1905, the year the modern Forest Service was created as an agency of the U.S. Department of Agriculture, Mr. Ringland was assigned to the Southwest Region. As one of the first graduate foresters ever to work in the area, he was appointed Forest Assistant on the Lincoln National Forest. From 1908 to 1916, he was District Forester (Regional Forester) for the Southwestern Region. He led the survey crew that established the boundaries of the National Forests in the Region and a pioneer of fire planning.

Mr. Ringland was present in the office of President Taft when the New Mexico statehood proclamation was signed in 1912.

In 1917, he joined the Army. He was assigned to a forestry regiment formed to run sawmills in France. After the war, he stayed on to serve on the Board of War Damages for the American Peace Commission. Between 1919 and 1921, Mr. Ringland was chief of mission, under Herbert Hoover, for the American Relief Administration in Europe He directed the post war relief to Czechoslovak children and from 1922 to 1924 was chief of mission to Turkey for relief of Russian refugees. As a consultant to the National Defense Advisory Commission, he investigated the extent of disturbance to human life when farm land was taken for military sites. Ringland was awarded the Czechoslovak Order of the White Lion by President Tomáš Masaryk in 1921. He was also awarded the Order of St. Stanislaus by General Pyotr Wrangel for the Russian Government in exile in 1922.

Ringland was a lifelong member of the Cosmos Club of Washington, one of the first members of the Society of American Foresters which elected him a Fellow, and was a member of the Forest History Society. He died October 12, 1981, in Bethesda, Maryland.
