= Michel Camdessus =

French economist and administrator

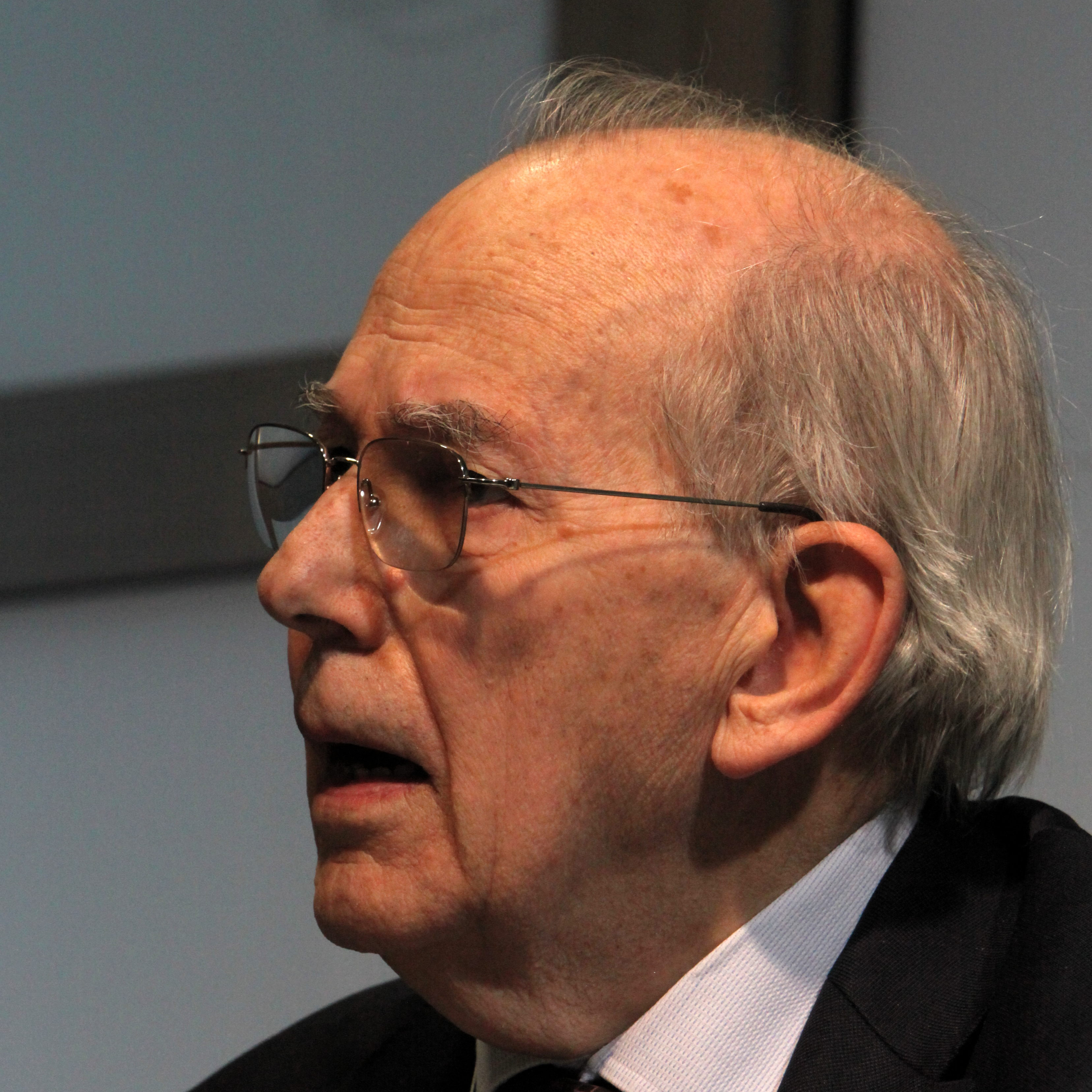
- Camdessus in 2012

Managing Director of the International Monetary Fund
- In office 16 January 1987 – 14 February 2000
- Preceded by: Jacques de Larosière
- Succeeded by: Horst Köhler

Governor of the Banque de France
- In office 14 November 1984 – 16 January 1987
- Preceded by: Renaud de La Genière
- Succeeded by: Jacques de Larosière

Personal details
- Born: 1 May 1933 (age 93) Bayonne, France
- Education: University of Paris
- Profession: Economist

Michel Camdessus (born 1 May 1933) is a French economist who served as the seventh managing director of the International Monetary Fund (IMF) from 1987 to 2000, making him the longest-serving in that position. Prior to his tenure at the IMF, he served as the Governor of the Banque de France from 1984 to 1987, after a brief term as Deputy Governor from August to November 1984 when elevated to the top position.

One notable events during his tenure at the IMF was the 1997 East Asian financial crisis. His role during the crisis has drawn criticism, for not paying attention to the unique circumstances of the East Asian countries and blindly imposing the measures that were followed in Mexico, leading to considerable turmoil and rioting in countries such as Indonesia.

Born in Bayonne, France, Mr. Camdessus studied at the University of Paris and earned postgraduate degrees in economics from the Institut d'Etudes Politiques de Paris (Sciences Po) in Paris and École nationale d'administration.

Camdessus is currently the president of the social initiative Semaines sociales de France (French social weeks), a social initiative, and a member of the Commission for Africa established by Tony Blair. He is also a member of the Pontifical Commission for Justice and Peace.

Additionally, Camdessus is a member of the Africa Progress Panel (APP), a group of ten distinguished individuals who advocate at the highest levels for equitable and sustainable development in Africa. As part of this Panel, he contributes to coalition-building, leverage and broker knowledge sharing, and influencing policies for lasting change in Africa.

He is also a member of the board of directors of the Fondation Chirac's, founded by former French president Jacques Chirac in 2008 to promote world peace. Camdessus participates in the jury for the Conflict Prevention Prize awarded every year by this foundation, and in the scientific committee of its Water and Sanitation program.

Government offices
Preceded by Renaud de La Genière	Governor of the Banque de France; 1984–1987	Succeeded by Jacques de Larosière
Preceded by Jacques de Larosière	Head of the International Monetary Fund; 1987–2000	Succeeded by Horst Köhler
