= Bank of Botswana =

Monetary authority of Botswana

Bank of Botswana Banka Ya Botswana

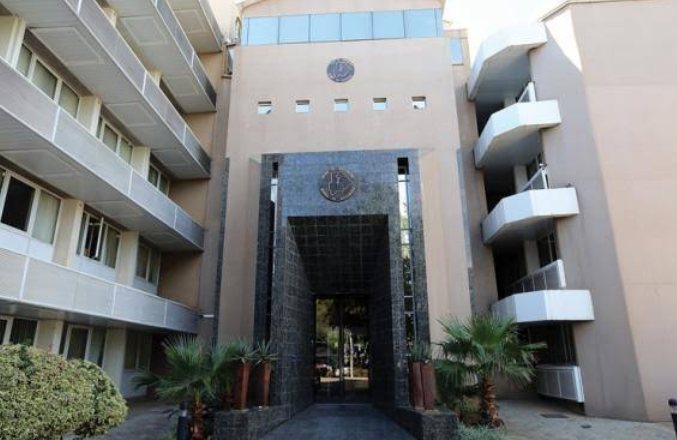
- Central bank of: Botswana
- Headquarters: Gaborone, Botswana
- Established: 1 July 1975
- Ownership: Government of Botswana 100%
- Governor: Cornelius Karlens Dekop
- Currency: Botswana pula BWP (ISO 4217)
- Reserves: 7 390 million USD
- Bank rate: 1.90% 2024)
- Website: bankofbotswana.bw

The Bank of Botswana (BoB; Tswana: Polokelo ya Madi ya Botswana) is the central bank of Botswana.

When Botswana gained independence from Britain in 1966, the country was part of the Rand Monetary Area (RMA). In 1974 Botswana withdrew from the RMA, and the Bank of Botswana and Financial Institution Acts established the legal framework for a central bank in Botswana to be established in July 1975, with Christopher H. L. Hermans as the first Governor. The pula was launched as a national currency in 1976, and in 1977 the Bank of Botswana became the government banker.

The Bank manages Botswana's sovereign wealth fund, the Pula Fund.

== History ==
The Bank of Botswana was established by a decision to withdraw from the Rand Monetary Area (RMA) under which the South African rand had been the legal currency in Botswana since independence in 1966. In 1973 Sir Seretse Khama appointed a Monetary Preparatory Commission. The decision to withdraw from the RMA was announced by the President in September 1974.

The Bank launched the national currency, the Pula, on the 23 August 1976.

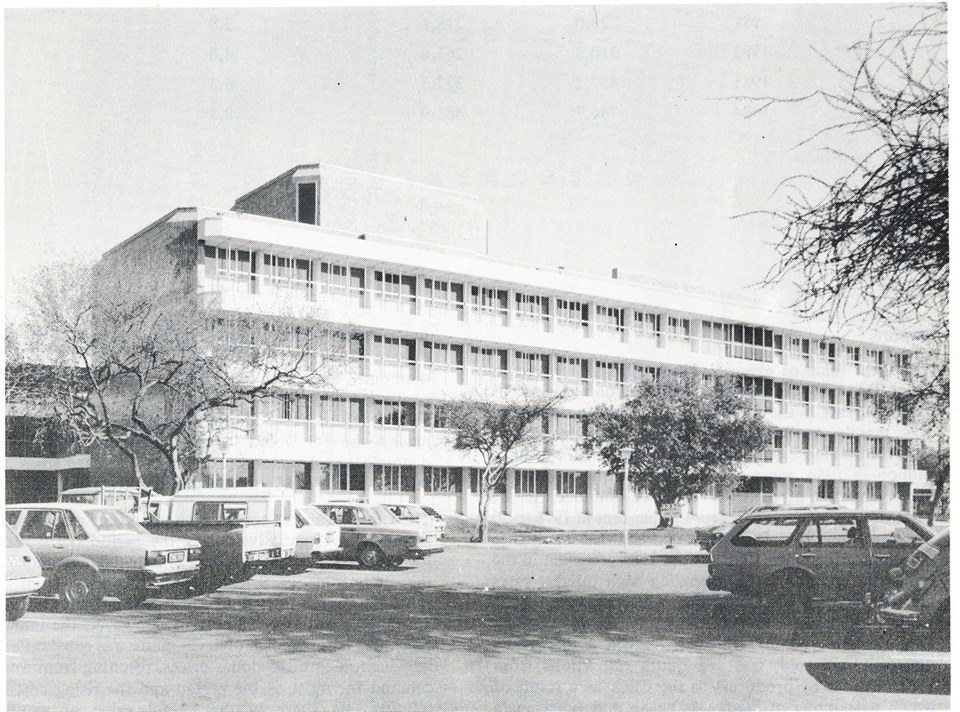
Bank of Botswana building in 1980s

== Governors of the Bank of Botswana ==
- July 1975 - 1978: Christopher H. L. Hermans
- January 1978 - 1980: Brenton C. Leavitt
- November 1980 - 1981: Festus Mogae
- January 1981 - June 1987: Charles Nyonyintono Kikonyogo
- July 1987 - 1997: Christopher H. L. Hermans
- July 1997 - September 1999: Baledzi Gaolathe
- October 1999 - 2016: Linah Mohohlo
- October 2016 – October 2023: Moses Pelaelo
- 21 October 2023 - Present: Cornelius Dekop

== See also ==
- Central banks and currencies of Africa
- Economy of Botswana
- Minister of Finance (Botswana)
- Botswana Central Bank Staff Union
- List of central banks
- List of financial supervisory authorities by country
