= Tidjane Thiam =

Ivorian businessman

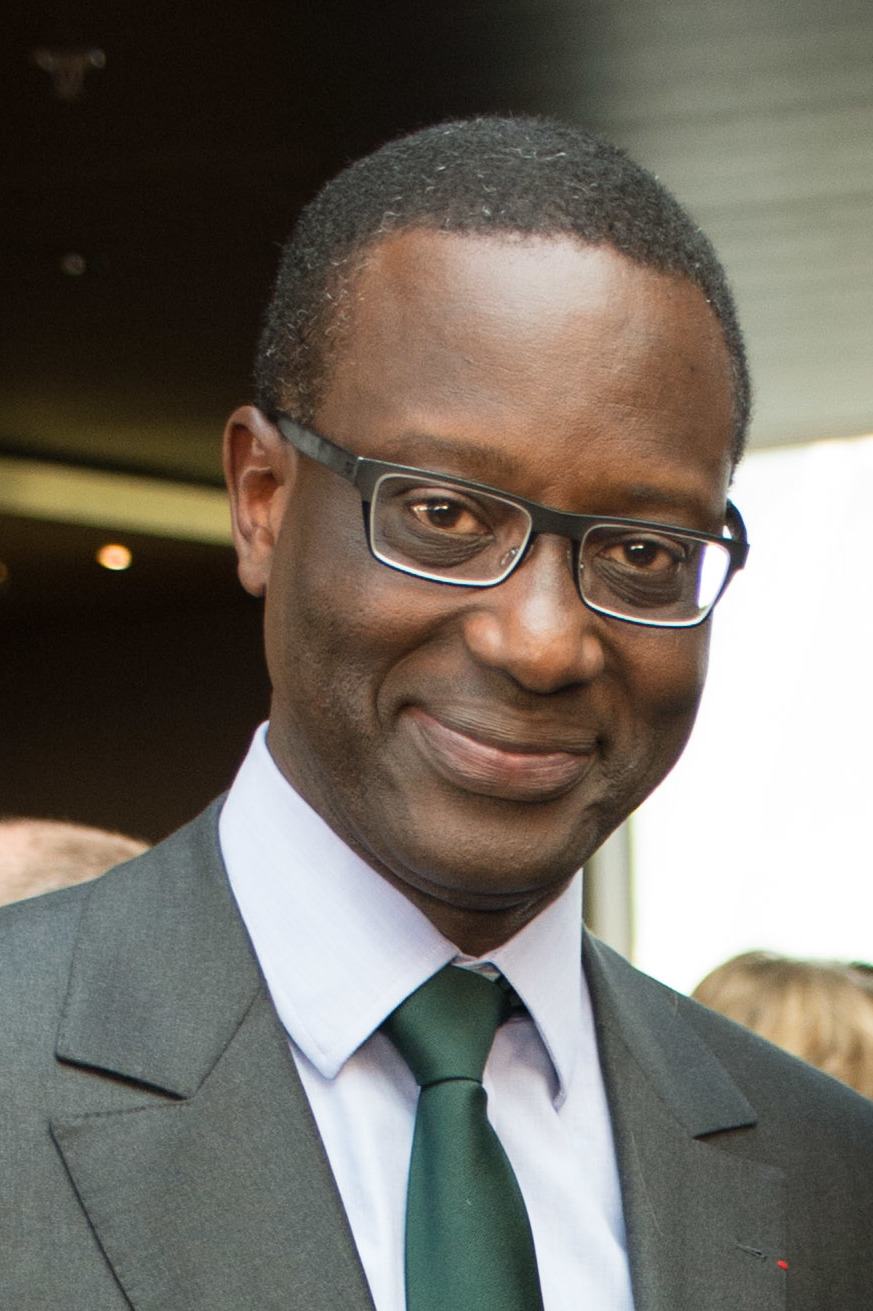
- Thiam in 2015
- Born: 29 July 1962 (age 64); Abidjan, Ivory Coast
- Education: École Polytechnique; Paris School of Mines; INSEAD
- Political party: Democratic Party of Ivory Coast-African Democratic Rally
- Spouse: Annette Thiam (divorced)
- Children: 2

Tidjane Thiam (French: [tidʒan tiam]; born 29 July 1962) is an Ivorian businessman and politician. He was the chief executive officer (CEO) of Swiss bank Credit Suisse from March 2015 to February 2020. He was the chief financial officer of British banking group Prudential from 2007 to 2009, and then its CEO until 2015. In 2019, Thiam became a member of the International Olympic Committee (IOC). He was executive chairman of Freedom Acquisition Corp, a special-purpose acquisition company that merged with American solar company Complete Solaria in 2023, taking the latter public.

Born into a prominent political family in the Ivory Coast, he had dual Ivorian and French nationality between 1987 and 2025. He studied advanced mathematics and physics in France before joining the management consultants McKinsey & Company in 1986, where he worked until 1994. From 1994 to 1999 he worked in the Ivory Coast first as chief executive of the National Bureau for Technical Studies (BNETD). Following the 1999 Ivorian coup d'état, he resumed a private sector career and rejoined McKinsey in Paris from 2000 to 2002, then worked as a senior executive for Aviva before being recruited by Prudential.

In 2020, Thiam was appointed by the shareholders of the Kering Foundation to become part of the board of directors, as well as to take the position as Chair of the Audit Committee.

== Early life and education ==
Thiam was born in the Ivory Coast (Côte d'Ivoire) on 29 July 1962. He is a descendant of two prominent families from Senegal and Ivory Coast. On his mother's side, he is a descendant of Queen Yamousso, after whom the capital of Côte d'Ivoire, Yamoussoukro, is named. Thiam's mother, Marietou, was the niece of Chief Félix Houphouët-Boigny, the founder and first President of Côte d'Ivoire.

His father, Amadou Thiam (Ivorian politician), a journalist, was born in Senegal and emigrated to Côte d'Ivoire in 1947. He supported Houphouet-Boigny in his fight for the independence of the country and served more than ten years in the Ivorian cabinet after independence.

Tidjane's uncle, Habib Thiam, was Prime Minister of Senegal for more than 10 years and also served as President of the National Assembly.

In 1982 Thiam was the first Ivorian to pass the entrance examination to the École Polytechnique in Paris. In 1984, he graduated from the École Polytechnique and in 1986 from the École Nationale Supérieure des Mines de Paris where he was top of his class. In 1986 he was offered a scholarship to study for an MBA at INSEAD and join the McKinsey Fellows Programme' in Paris. He received an MBA from INSEAD in 1988 (Dean's list). In 1989 he took a one-year sabbatical from McKinsey to participate in the World Bank's Young Professionals Program in Washington, D.C. He returned to McKinsey in 1990, working first in New York City and then in Paris.

== Government career ==
I have always said I am not a politician. I like the business life. I like to keep some faith in human nature, and one thing I feel about politics is that if you want to lose any faith you have in people, just stay in that business. I wanted to keep a few illusions.

— Thiam in a 2009 interview with The Daily Telegraph

In December 1993, the first Ivorian President, Félix Houphouët-Boigny, died and was replaced by Henri Konan Bédié. In April 1994, at the request of the new president, Thiam left France and McKinsey to go back to Abidjan and become the CEO of the National Bureau for Technical Studies and Development (BNETD), an infrastructure development and economic advisory body with more than 4,000 staff, reporting directly to the President and the Prime Minister. In that role, which had cabinet rank, he was also handling key negotiations with the International Monetary Fund and the World Bank. Thiam was also a key member of the Privatization Committee, in charge of privatising extensive state-owned assets.

In August 1998, in addition to his role at the BNETD, where he became chairman, Thiam formally joined the cabinet and was appointed Minister of Planning and Development. In his years in Côte d'Ivoire, Thiam promoted private sector involvement in infrastructure development. He implemented flagship projects including the Azito power plant (nominated by the Financial Times as one of the boldest successful investment decisions in the world), the renovation of Abidjan airport and the construction of the Riviera Marcory toll bridge, whose financing was closed a few days before the 1999 coup. One of the first actions of the new president, Alassane Ouattara, in 2011 was to start the construction of that bridge as originally overseen by Thiam, with the same promoters.

Thiam actively promoted an extensive privatisation programme which saw, between 1994 and 1999, Côte d'Ivoire lead African countries by privatising its telephone, services, electric power generation, airports, railways and many companies in the agricultural sector. In 1998, the World Economic Forum in Davos named him as one of the annual 100 Global Leaders for Tomorrow, and in 1999 the Forum named him a member of the Dream Cabinet. In December 1999, whilst Thiam was abroad, the Ivorian military seized control of the government. Thiam returned to the country, where he was arrested and held for several weeks. Robert Guéï, the new head of state, offered him the position of chief of staff, but he declined and left the country in early 2000.

== Prudential ==
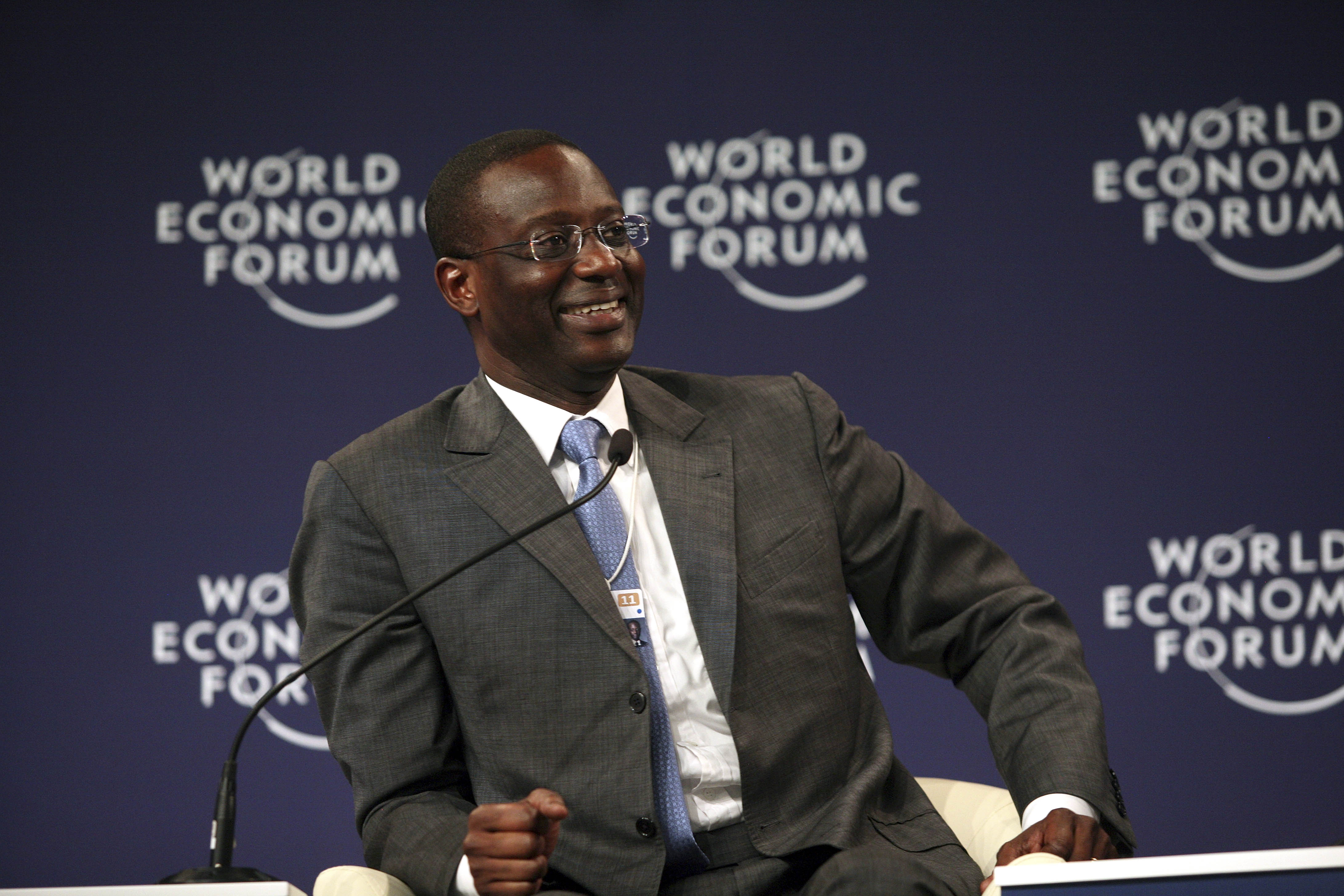
Thiam speaking at the World Economic Forum in Dalian, China, 2011.

On returning to Europe, Thiam was offered a partnership by McKinsey in Paris, becoming one of the leaders of the company's financial institutions practice. In 2002 he joined Aviva, initially as group strategy and development director, then as managing director of Aviva International, chief executive of Aviva Europe and an executive director, sitting on the plc board. In January 2007, after Richard Harvey announced he would step down as chief executive of Aviva, Thiam was tipped as a possible future head of the group. Thiam left Aviva in September 2007 to become chief financial officer of Prudential plc. In March 2009, Thiam was named chief executive, effective from October, after Mark Tucker chose to step down. The appointment made him the first African to lead a FTSE 100 listed company. His departure from the role was announced on 10 March 2015.

After he became chief executive, Prudential launched a bid for AIA, the Asian wing of the crisis-stricken AIG. A public battle ensued, with some investors complaining about the $35.5 billion price Prudential was offering to pay. The bid eventually failed, after the AIG board rejected a revised lower bid. AIA was later floated on the Hong Kong Stock Exchange, and the value of the company quickly rose above Prudential's original bid price. Thiam came under strong personal criticism following the failure of the bid, partly as a result of the costs incurred by the company in pursuing the bid. However, he was re-elected as CEO at the May 2011 AGM with a 99.3 per cent vote. The company's performance since the bid appears not to have been damaged by its failure - in the first nine months of 2011, Prudential delivered a 14 per cent increase in new business profits over the same period in 2010, with total insurance sales increasing by 10 per cent, while in its full-year results for 2013, Prudential delivered an IFRS operating profit of £2.95 billion, up 17 per cent from the year before. In March 2013, the Financial Services Authority fined Prudential £30m and censured its CEO, Thiam, for failure to inform it of its plans to buy AIA and failure of dealing with the FSA in an open and cooperative manner. As of November 2014, Thiam was a member of the UK Prime Minister's Business Advisory Group; as of July 2015 the composition of the group had changed and Thiam was no longer a member. At the time of his departure from Prudential, Thiam was also one of UK Trade & Investment’s business ambassadors.

== Credit Suisse ==
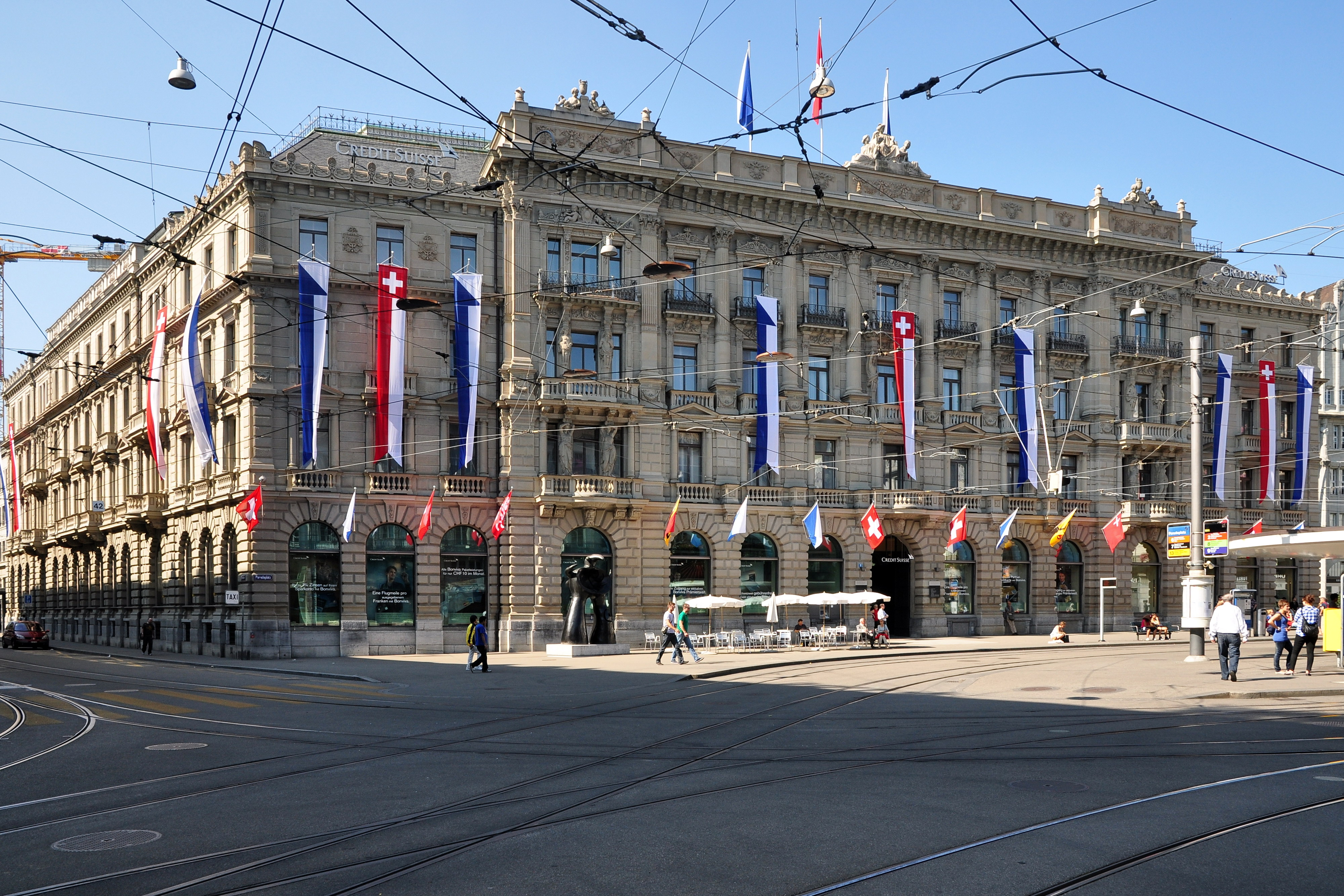
Thiam was appointed chief executive of Credit Suisse in 2015.

Thiam was appointed the chief executive officer (CEO) of Swiss investment bank and financial services company Credit Suisse Group AG on 10 March 2015. An hour after his appointment was announced, the company stock increased by 7.5%. During his first two years, he led the bank through a restructuring process cutting costs and jobs. His compensation was US$9.9 million in 2016 and $10.2 million in 2017. His pay was originally scheduled to be $11.2 million in 2017, however it was reduced after shareholder backlash. From 2016 to 2019, under Thiam, Credit Suisse expanded their wealth management business and generated new net assets of CHF121bn (€113.7bn), while their pre-tax profit from wealth management grew double-digit (+15%) for four years in a row, from €2.5bn in 2015 to €4.4bn in 2019. In March 2018, Thiam detailed a new profitability track for the company by stating: "We've been cleaning up a lot of undesirable trades that we should not have done... There's no way to clean up the past, given the legacy we have, without generating losses. We have profitable operations of the company."

=== Resignation ===
In September 2019, he became involved in a scandal with Iqbal Khan, a former employee of Credit Suisse who had transferred to UBS. Khan, Credit Suisse's former head of Wealth Management, accused Thiam of sending spies after him. The two, who were also neighbors, were alleged to have fallen out over personal issues earlier on. In October 2019, Credit Suisse cleared Thiam of ordering the botched surveillance. The Homburger inquiry presented its report to the Credit Suisse board and said that Pierre-Olivier Bouée (the Credit Suisse COO at that time), not Thiam, had independently made the call to follow Khan. Bouée resigned, although he has since said that he intends to sue the bank. Credit Suisse's head of global security also resigned.

On February 7, 2020, Tidjane Thiam resigned amid a power struggle which followed the spying scandal. In a statement, Thiam said: "I had no knowledge of the observation of two former colleagues. It undoubtedly disturbed Credit Suisse and caused anxiety and hurt. I regret that this happened and it should never have taken place," Thiam said in the statement. The Credit Suisse's Board accepted Thiam's resignation through a unanimous vote. The IOC stated that the scandal would not affect his position in the Olympic Movement and therefore it would not affect his membership in the IOC, which is to remain until Thiam reaches the mandatory retirement age of 70.

== International development ==
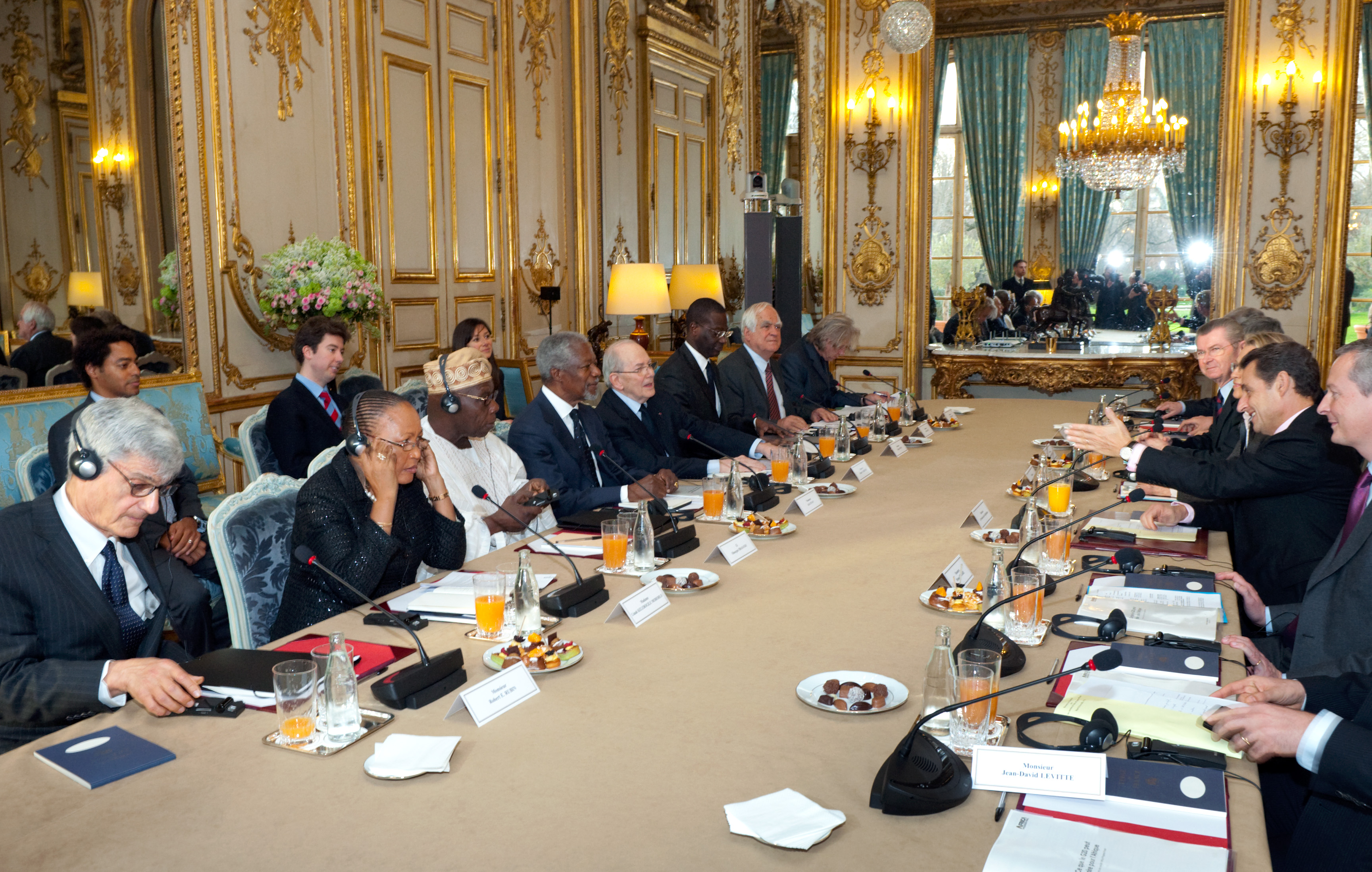
Thiam (ninth on the left) at a meeting with Africa Progress Panel, 2011

In October 1999 Thiam was appointed by James Wolfensohn as one of 20 members of the External Advisory Council of the World Bank Institute, which the Institute relies on for advice and guidance. Thiam is a member of the Africa Progress Panel (APP), a group of ten distinguished individuals who advocate at the highest levels for equitable and sustainable development in Africa. Every year, the Panel releases a report, the Africa Progress Report, that outlines an issue of immediate importance to the continent and suggests a set of associated policies. In 2012, the Africa Progress Report highlighted issues of Jobs, Justice, and Equity.

In January 2011 Thiam was appointed chairman of the G20's High Level Panel on Infrastructure Investment. Established by the Seoul G20 summit in 2010, the panel was a grouping of figures from leading financial institutions and development agencies given the task of producing concrete proposals to encourage private sector investment in infrastructure projects in emerging economies. The panel submitted its report to the G20 Summit meeting in Cannes in November 2011. In 2013 Thiam was one of the authors of “A Partnership for the Future”, a report prepared at the request of the French Minister for the Economy and Finance by five French and Franco-African political and economic experts. The report set out proposals for building a new economic partnership based on a business relationship between France and the African continent, particularly the countries of Sub-Saharan Africa.

In November 2020, Thiam was appointed by the cabinet of Rwanda to head the board of Rwanda Finance Limited. In early 2021, he was appointed by the G20 to the High Level Independent Panel (HLIP) on financing the global commons for pandemic preparedness and response, co-chaired by Ngozi Okonjo-Iweala, Tharman Shanmugaratnam and Lawrence Summers.

== Awards and honors ==
Thiam was chairman of the Association of British Insurers between July 3, 2012, and October 1, 2014. Thiam is a member of the International Business Council of the World Economic Forum. He was a non-executive director of the French chemicals company Arkema until November 2009. In 2007, Thiam was elected INSEAD Alumnus of the Year by the Insead Alumnus Association. In 2009, he was nominated as one of "50 Alumni who changed the world" as part of the celebration of the 50th anniversary of INSEAD and its 38,000 graduates. He was ranked number one in both 2010 and 2011 by the annual publication the Powerlist, which ranks the 100 most influential Africans in the UK.

In July 2011, Thiam was awarded the rank of Chevalier of the Légion d'honneur by the French government in recognition of his significant contribution to civil life for more than 20 years. In 2013, he was awarded the Grand Prix de l’Économie, organised by Les Échos and Radio Classique, in partnership with law firm Freshfields Bruckhaus Deringer.

In July 2018, business and finance magazine Euromoney named Thiam "Banker of the Year 2018", citing his "radical three-year plan" that had "reinvented" Credit Suisse.

== 2025 Ivorian presidential election ==
On February 7, 2025, Thiam announced that he had renounced his French nationality in order to be eligible for the 2025 Ivorian presidential election scheduled in October. On April 18, 2025, he was unanimously nominated by the Democratic Party of Ivory Coast – African Democratic Rally (PDCI) to be its candidate in the election. On 22 April he was removed from the electoral roll, with a court saying that he had forfeited his Ivorian citizenship when he acquired French citizenship in 1987. However, Thiam has challenged the decision. A legal expert explained that Thiam was born a dual national under French law, and the Ivorian Bar Association warned against the politicization of the judiciary. He was not included in the final list of candidates released on 4 June.

Amid growing controversy, Ivorian authorities clarified that Thiam had regained Ivorian citizenship in 2025 following his formal renunciation of French citizenship that same year. In May 2025, Thiam was removed from the electoral roll, effectively making him ineligible for the election. On 12 May, Thiam resigned as leader of the PDCI. On 14 May, Thiam, the sole candidate, was re-elected as PDCI president with more than 99% of the vote. PDCI political bureau member Valérie Yapo did filed a legal challenge against Thiam's election of 2023 based on his citizenship issues, which was dismissed on 22 May 2025.

In September 2025, his candidacy to the presidential election was rejected by the constitutional council.

== Personal life ==
Tidjane was married to Annette Anthony Thiam, an African-American lawyer who used to work for Joe Biden, and they have two sons. Tidjane's eldest son Bilal Thiam died of cancer in May 2020 at the age of 24.

Tidjane and Annette separated in 2015, and divorced in 2016. He speaks English, French, and German fluently.
