= Adoption of the euro in Croatia =

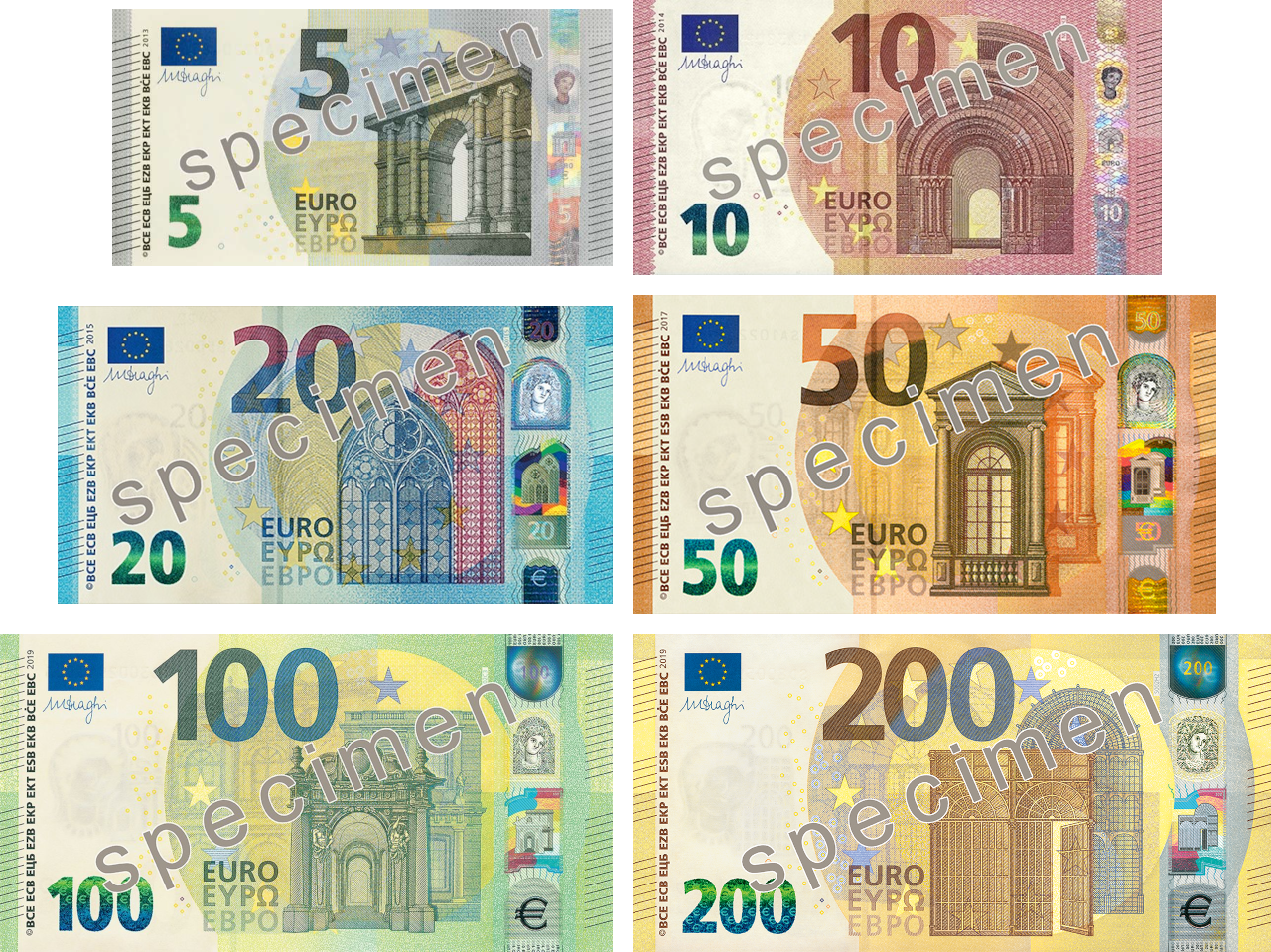
- Euro banknotes - all denominations
- Date: 1 January 2023 (introduction) – 14 January 2023 (complete transition).
- Location: Croatia
- Type: Economic transition
- Theme: Adoption of the euro as the national currency
- Participants: Government of Croatia, European Union
- Outcome: Replacement of the Croatian kuna with the euro

Eurozone participation European Union member states (special territories not shown) 21 in the eurozone 1 in ERM II, with an opt-out (Denmark) 5 not in ERM II, but committed to join the eurozone after meeting the convergence criteria (Czech Republic, Hungary, Poland, Romania, and Sweden) Non–EU member states 4 using the euro with a monetary agreement (Andorra, Monaco, San Marino, and Vatican City) 2 using the euro unilaterally (Kosovo and Montenegro)

Croatia adopted the euro as its currency on 1 January 2023, becoming the 20th member state of the eurozone. A fixed conversion rate was set at €1 = 7.5345 kn. Croatia's previous currency, the kuna (Croatian for marten), had used the euro as its main reference since its creation in 1994. A long-held policy of the Croatian National Bank was to maintain the kuna's exchange rate with the euro within a relatively stable range.

Croatia's European Union (EU) membership obliged it to introduce the euro once it had fulfilled the euro convergence criteria. It joined the European Exchange Rate Mechanism (ERM II) on 10 July 2020. Many small businesses in Croatia had debts denominated in euros before EU accession which were converted. Croatians used the euro for most savings and many informal transactions. On 18 July 2022, the Croatian Mint began producing euro coins with Croatian national motifs.

== History ==
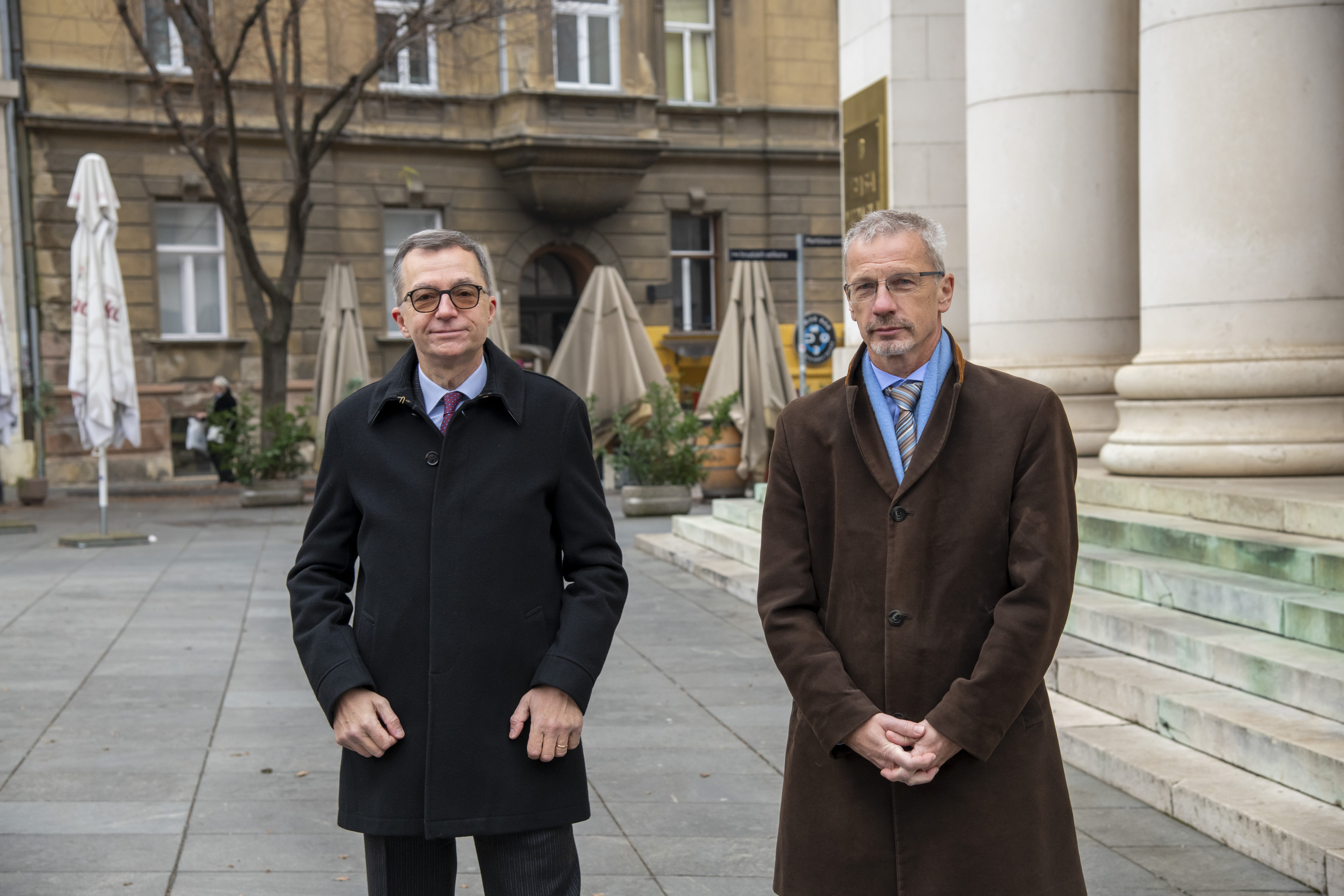
Croatian central banker Boris Vujčić (right) at the Croatian National Bank, 2022

The Croatian National Bank anticipated euro adoption within two or three years of Croatia's entry into the EU in 2013. Governor Boris Vujčić expressed his preference that year for the kuna to be replaced by the euro as soon as possible after accession. It was obliged join the eurozone once it fulfilled the euro convergence criteria. This could occur only at least two years after Croatia joined the ERM II. The EU's response to the financial crisis in the eurozone delayed Croatia's euro adoption. The country's contracting economy posed a challenge to meeting the convergence criteria. The European Central Bank (ECB) expected Croatia to be approved for ERM II membership in 2016 at the earliest, with euro adoption in 2019.

A letter of intent to join the ERM II mechanism was sent on 5 July 2019 to the ECB. The letter marked the first formal step toward the adoption of the euro. Croatia committed to joining the Banking union of the European Union as part of its efforts to join ERM II. On 23 November 2019, European Commissioner Valdis Dombrovskis said that Croatia could join ERM II in the second half of 2020. Croatia joined ERM II on 10 July 2020. The central rate of the kuna was set at 1 euro = 7.53450 kuna. The earliest possible date for euro adoption, which required two years of ERM II participation, was therefore 10 July 2022.

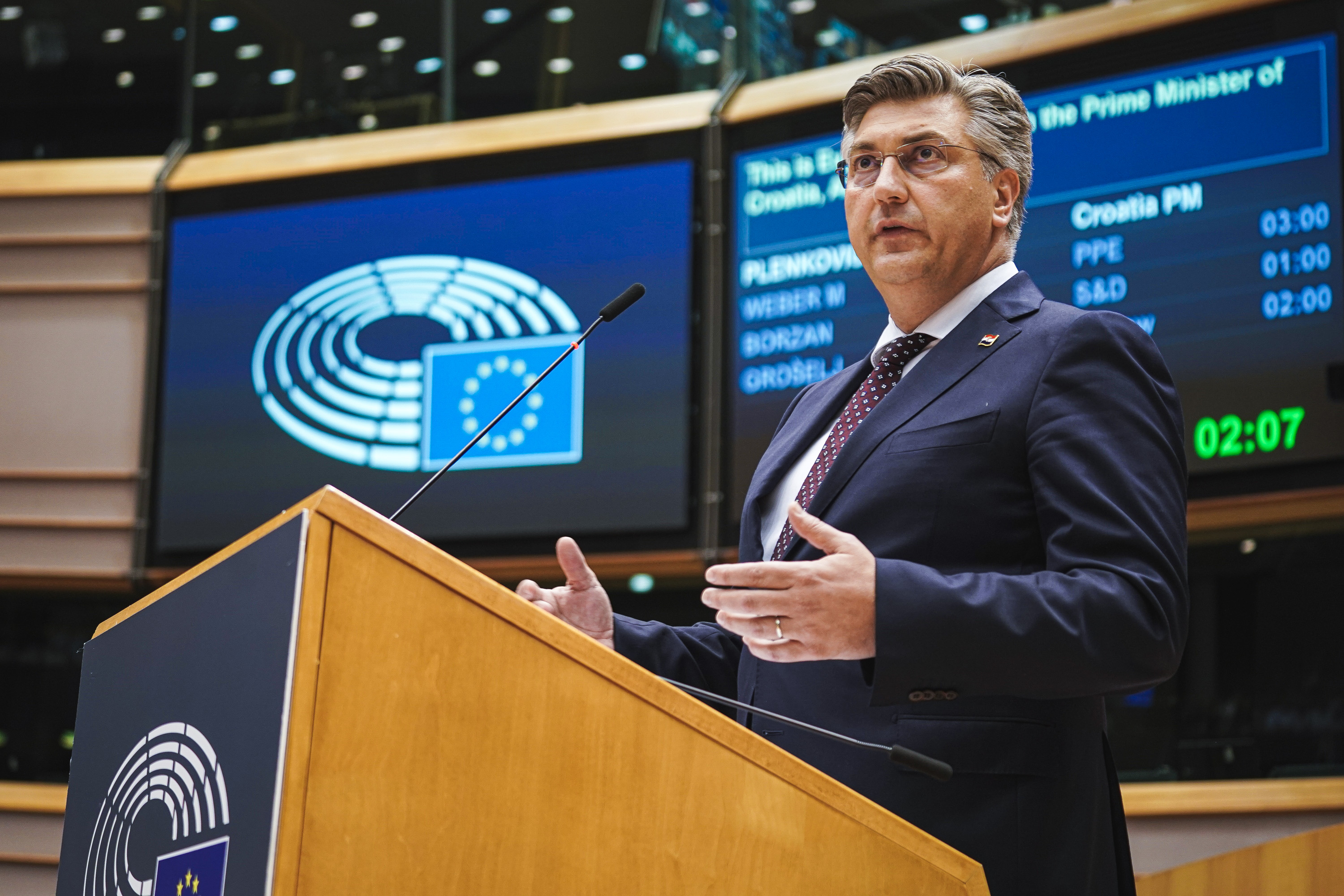
Prime Minister Andrej Plenković expressing support for the Croatian euro in 2022

On 11 November 2020, Prime Minister Andrej Plenković stated that Croatia intended to adopt the euro on 1 January 2023. In September 2021, following a meeting of the Eurogroup in Slovenia, Croatia signed an official agreement (a Memorandum of Understanding) with the European Commission and eurozone member states on the practical steps for the minting of Croatian euro coins. On 7 December, Croatia and the European Commission signed a Partnership Agreement for the organisation of information and communication campaigns concerning the changeover from the kuna to the euro in Croatia. In November 2021, the Croatian right-wing and eurosceptic party Croatian Sovereignists were unable to obtain the required number of signatures to force a referendum to block the planned adoption of the euro.

On 10 December 2021, Finance Minister Marić announced that the bill introducing the euro in Croatia was drafted and could be outlined in mid-January, with final adoption expected in April 2022. On 14 December 2021, Prime Minister Plenković stated that he expected a final decision from the EU on Croatia's accession to the Schengen and euro areas in 2022. In January 2022, he announced that from 5 September, prices would be displayed in both kuna and euros throughout the country, continuing for the whole of 2023. In 2023, everyone would be able to exchange kuna for euros free of charge at banks, Croatian Post offices, and branches of financial services and payment systems. On 13 May 2022, the Croatian Parliament voted in favour of the proposal to introduce the euro as legal tender.

In May 2022, the European Commission completed an assessment of Croatia's progress. The official decision on euro adoption is made by the EU's ECOFIN Council and could not occur prior to 10 July 2022, two years after Croatia joined ERM II. On 1 June 2022, the Commission assessed in its 2022 convergence report that Croatia fulfilled all the criteria for joining the euro area and proposed to the Council that Croatia adopt the euro on 1 January 2023. On 16 June 2022, the euro area member states recommended that Croatia become the 20th member. On 24 June 2022, the European Council supported the Commission's proposal for Croatia to adopt the euro.

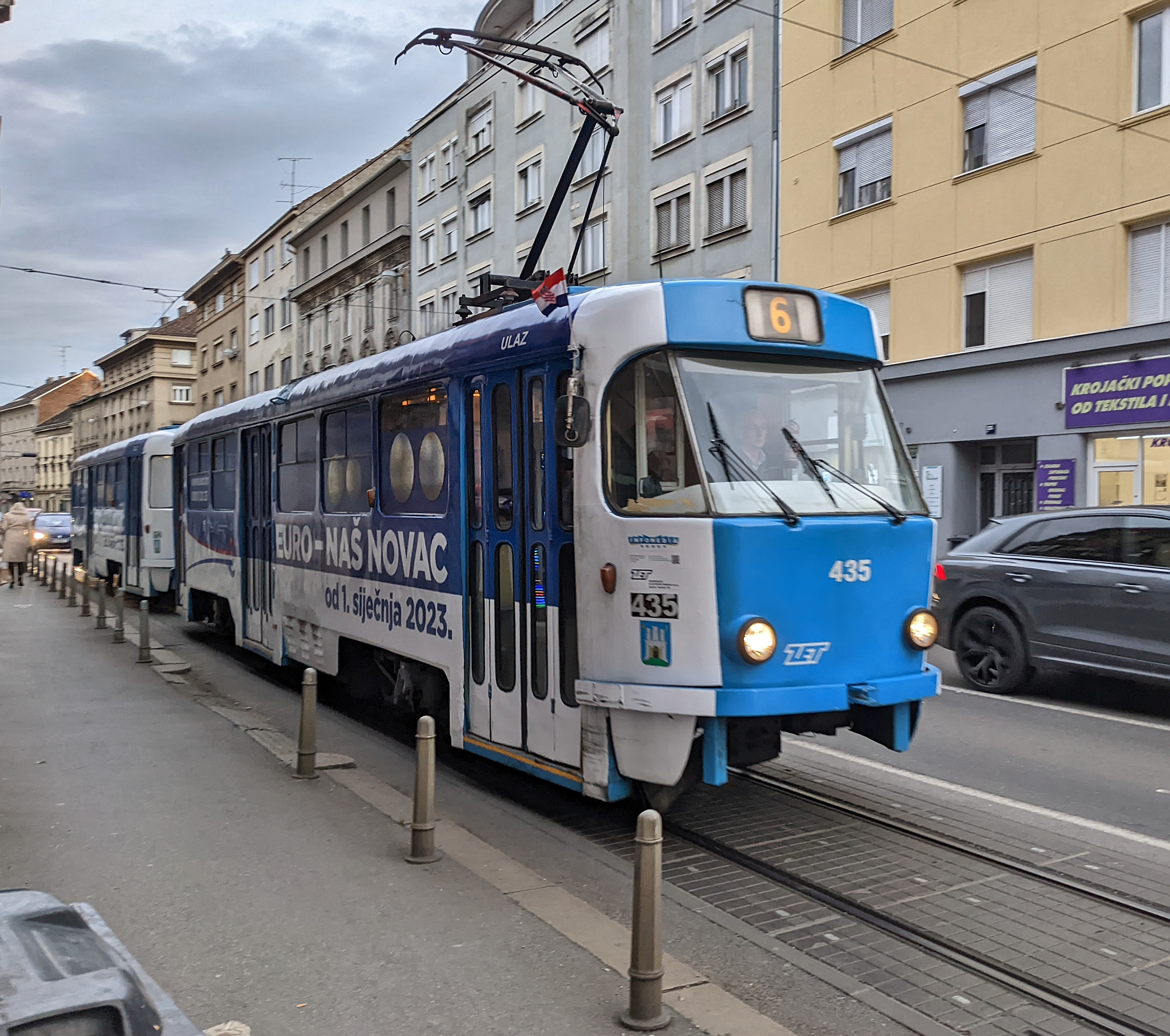
Zagreb tram promoting 1 January 2023 as the official euro area conversion date.

On 5 July 2022, the European Parliament approved Croatia's entry into the eurozone with 539 votes in favour, 45 against, and 48 abstentions. Parliament supported the report of Siegfried Mureșan that Croatia had fulfilled all the criteria for adopting the euro on 1 January 2023. On 12 July 2022, the Council of EU adopted the final three legal acts that were required for Croatia to adopt the euro as legal tender. A fixed exchange rate was set at €1 = 7.53450 kuna. On 18 July 2022, the Croatian Mint began producing euro coins with Croatian national motifs.

From 5 September 2022 until 31 December 2023, the display of all prices in both currencies was mandatory to prevent unjustified price increases. Starting on 1 December 2022, the public could buy euro starter kits to familiarise themselves with the new currency. The coins were not to be used before 1 January 2023. Cash payments could be made in both currencies during the first two weeks of January 2023 (with change given in euros); thereafter, payments could be made only in euros. Kuna coins could be exchanged at the Croatian National Bank until 31 December 2025, while kuna banknotes can be exchanged indefinitely.

== Convergence status ==
In its first assessment under the convergence criteria in May 2014, the country satisfied the inflation and interest rate criteria, but did not satisfy the public finances, ERM membership, and legislation compatibility criteria. Subsequent convergence reports published in June 2016, May 2018 and June 2020 came to the same conclusions. The report published in June 2022 concluded Croatia fulfilled all the criteria for adopting the euro.

Convergence criteria
Assessment date	Country	HICP inflation rate (Note: The rate of change of the 12-month average HICP over the prior 12-month average must be no more than 1.5% larger than the unweighted arithmetic average of the similar HICP inflation rates in the 3 EU member states with the lowest HICP inflation. If any of these 3 states have a HICP rate significantly below the similarly averaged HICP rate for the eurozone (which according to ECB practice means more than 2% below), and if this low HICP rate has been primarily caused by exceptional circumstances (i.e. severe wage cuts or a strong recession), then such a state is not included in the calculation of the reference value and is replaced by the EU state with the fourth lowest HICP rate.)	Excessive deficit procedure		Exchange rate		Long-term interest rate (Note: The arithmetic average of the annual yield of 10-year government bonds as of the end of the past 12 months must be no more than 2.0% larger than the unweighted arithmetic average of the bond yields in the 3 EU member states with the lowest HICP inflation. If any of these states have bond yields which are significantly larger than the similarly averaged yield for the eurozone (which according to previous ECB reports means more than 2% above) and at the same time does not have complete funding access to financial markets (which is the case for as long as a government receives bailout funds), then such a state is not to be included in the calculation of the reference value.)	Compatibility of legislation
Assessment date	Country	HICP inflation rate	Budget deficit to GDP	Debt-to-GDP ratio	ERM II member	Change in rate (Note: The change in the annual average exchange rate against the euro.)	Long-term interest rate	Compatibility of legislation
2014 ECB Report (Note: Reference values from the ECB convergence report of June 2014.)	Reference values	Max. 1.7% (Note: Latvia, Portugal and Ireland were the reference states, with Greece, Bulgaria and Cyprus excluded as outliers.) (as of 30 Apr 2014)	None open (as of 30 Apr 2014)		Min. 2 years (as of 30 Apr 2014)	Max. ±15% (Note: The maximum allowed change in rate is ± 2.25% for Denmark.) (for 2013)	Max. 6.2% (Note: Latvia, Ireland and Portugal were the reference states.) (as of 30 Apr 2014)	Compliant (as of 30 Apr 2014)
2014 ECB Report	Reference values	Max. 1.7% (as of 30 Apr 2014)	Max. 3.0% (FY 2013)	Max. 60% (FY 2013)	Min. 2 years (as of 30 Apr 2014)	Max. ±15% (for 2013)	Max. 6.2% (as of 30 Apr 2014)	Compliant (as of 30 Apr 2014)
2014 ECB Report	Croatia	1.1%	Open		No	-0.8%	4.8%	No
2014 ECB Report	Croatia	1.1%	4.9%	67.1%	No	-0.8%	4.8%	No
2016 ECB Report (Note: Reference values from the ECB convergence report of June 2016.)	Reference values	Max. 0.7% (Note: Bulgaria, Slovenia and Spain were the reference states, with Cyprus and Romania excluded as outliers.) (as of 30 Apr 2016)	None open (as of 18 May 2016)		Min. 2 years (as of 18 May 2016)	Max. ±15% (for 2015)	Max. 4.0% (Note: Slovenia, Spain and Bulgaria were the reference states.) (as of 30 Apr 2016)	Compliant (as of 18 May 2016)
2016 ECB Report	Reference values	Max. 0.7% (as of 30 Apr 2016)	Max. 3.0% (FY 2015)	Max. 60% (FY 2015)	Min. 2 years (as of 18 May 2016)	Max. ±15% (for 2015)	Max. 4.0% (as of 30 Apr 2016)	Compliant (as of 18 May 2016)
2016 ECB Report	Croatia	-0.4%	Open		No	0.3%	3.7%	No
2016 ECB Report	Croatia	-0.4%	3.2%	86.7%	No	0.3%	3.7%	No
2018 ECB Report (Note: Reference values from the ECB convergence report of May 2018.)	Reference values	Max. 1.9% (Note: Cyprus, Ireland and Finland were the reference states.) (as of 31 Mar 2018)	None open (as of 3 May 2018)		Min. 2 years (as of 3 May 2018)	Max. ±15% (for 2017)	Max. 3.2% (Note: Cyprus, Ireland and Finland were the reference states.) (as of 31 Mar 2018)	Compliant (as of 20 March 2018)
2018 ECB Report	Reference values	Max. 1.9% (as of 31 Mar 2018)	Max. 3.0% (FY 2017)	Max. 60% (FY 2017)	Min. 2 years (as of 3 May 2018)	Max. ±15% (for 2017)	Max. 3.2% (as of 31 Mar 2018)	Compliant (as of 20 March 2018)
2018 ECB Report	Croatia	1.3%	None		No	0.9%	2.6%	No
2018 ECB Report	Croatia	1.3%	-0.8% (surplus)	78.0%	No	0.9%	2.6%	No
2020 ECB Report (Note: Reference values from the ECB convergence report of June 2020.)	Reference values	Max. 1.8% (Note: Portugal, Cyprus, and Italy were the reference states.) (as of 31 Mar 2020)	None open (as of 7 May 2020)		Min. 2 years (as of 7 May 2020)	Max. ±15% (for 2019)	Max. 2.9% (Note: Portugal, Cyprus, and Italy were the reference states.) (as of 31 Mar 2020)	Compliant (as of 24 March 2020)
2020 ECB Report	Reference values	Max. 1.8% (as of 31 Mar 2020)	Max. 3.0% (FY 2019)	Max. 60% (FY 2019)	Min. 2 years (as of 7 May 2020)	Max. ±15% (for 2019)	Max. 2.9% (as of 31 Mar 2020)	Compliant (as of 24 March 2020)
2020 ECB Report	Croatia	0.9%	None		No	0.0%	0.9%	No
2020 ECB Report	Croatia	0.9%	-0.4% (surplus)	73.2%	No	0.0%	0.9%	No
2022 ECB Report (Note: Reference values from the Convergence Report of June 2022.)	Reference values	Max. 4.9% (Note: France, Finland, and Greece were the reference states.) (as of April 2022)	None open (as of 25 May 2022)		Min. 2 years (as of 25 May 2022)	Max. ±15% (for 2021)	Max. 2.6% (as of April 2022)	Compliant (as of 25 March 2022)
2022 ECB Report	Reference values	Max. 4.9% (as of April 2022)	Max. 3.0% (FY 2021)	Max. 60% (FY 2021)	Min. 2 years (as of 25 May 2022)	Max. ±15% (for 2021)	Max. 2.6% (as of April 2022)	Compliant (as of 25 March 2022)
2022 ECB Report	Croatia	4.7%	None		1 year, 10 months	0.1%	0.8%	Yes
2022 ECB Report	Croatia	4.7%	2.9%	79.8% (exempt)	1 year, 10 months	0.1%	0.8%	Yes

Criterion fulfilled
Criterion potentially fulfilled: If the budget deficit exceeds the 3% limit, but is "close" to this value (the European Commission has deemed 3.5% to be close by in the past), then the criteria can still potentially be fulfilled if either the deficits in the previous two years are significantly declining towards the 3% limit, or if the excessive deficit is the result of exceptional circumstances which are temporary in nature (i.e. one-off expenditures triggered by a significant economic downturn, or by the implementation of economic reforms that are expected to deliver a significant positive impact on the government's future fiscal budgets). However, even if such "special circumstances" are found to exist, additional criteria must also be met to comply with the fiscal budget criterion. Additionally, if the debt-to-GDP ratio exceeds 60% but is "sufficiently diminishing and approaching the reference value at a satisfactory pace" it can be deemed to be in compliance.
Criterion not fulfilled

== Public opinion ==
The public opinion of the euro and its adoption in Croatia was varied. During a four month transition period before the euro replaced the kuna in 2023, Croatians staged boycotts of supermarkets due to price increases. The Croatian government displayed prices in both kuna and euro to help enhance price transparency and increase public opinion on the eventual conversion.

== Croatian euro coins ==
While the images of the reverse side of euro coins are common across coins issued by all countries, each country can choose identifying marks for the euros it mints. The national identifying marks on the Croatian euro coins: the Croatian checkerboard, the map of Croatia, a marten, Nikola Tesla, and the Glagolitic script were decided on by the government in 2021. A contest for the coin designs was held by the Croatian National Bank and completed in 2022. It received some negative reaction from Serbia and was also delayed by a licensing issue. The final set of designs was approved by the Council of the EU in April 2022.

== Domestic promotion ==
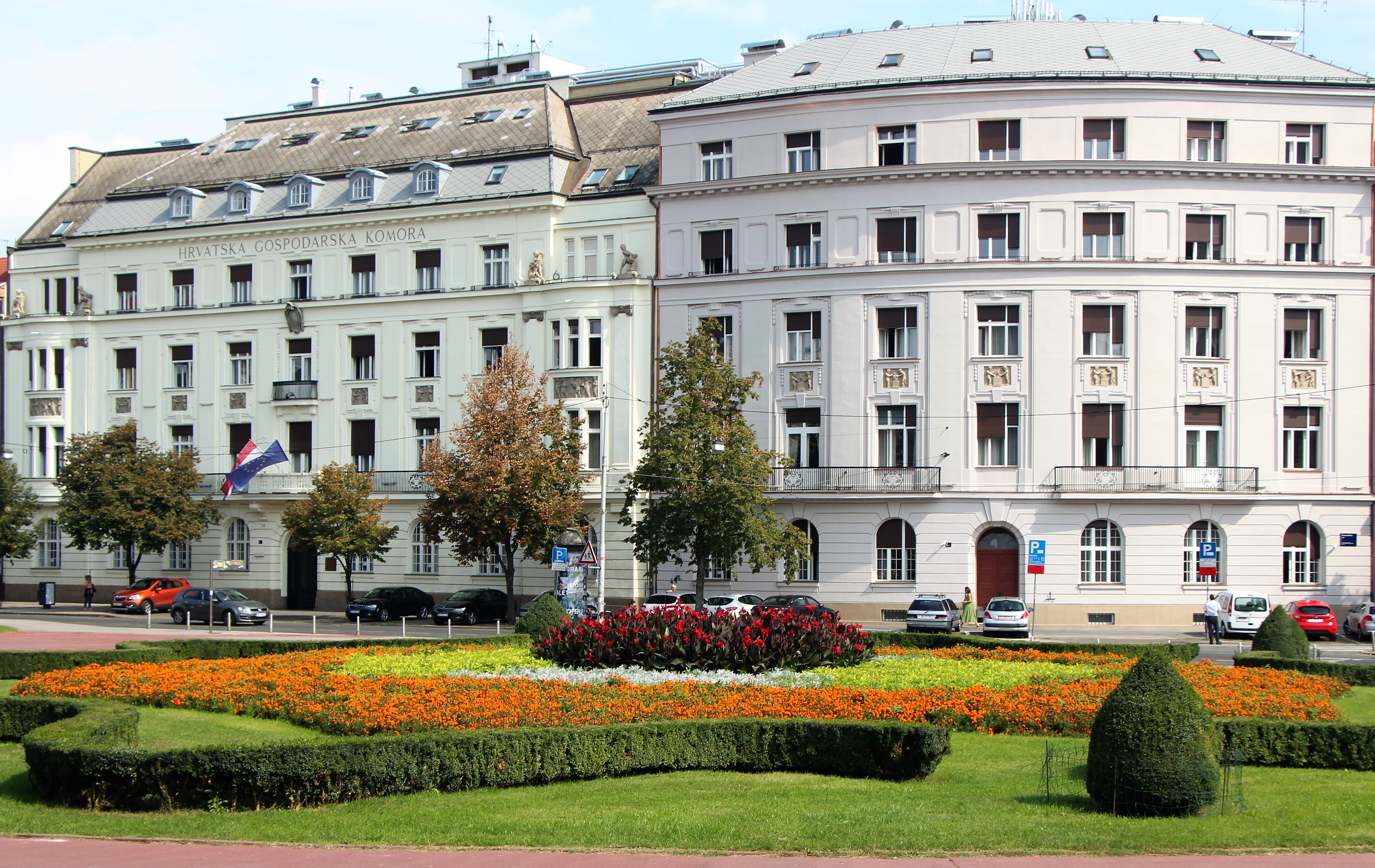
The Croatian Chamber of Economy, 2018

Throughout the month of October, four Euro Days were held with the first one being in Osijek on 8 October 2022. The other three Euro Days were held in Rijeka, Split, and Zagreb, all with the aim to promote the upcoming entry of Croatia into the eurozone and educate the local populations about the Euro. The Croatian Chamber of Economy (HGK) and the Croatian National Bank scheduled an online hybrid education on 12 October 2022 with the intention of providing basic information about the Euro and the new coin designs. Another promotion campaign of the euro in Croatia called "Euro on Wheels" took place in 27 cities in Croatia from 19 October until 17 December 2022, with the first one being in Vukovar. The cost of the campaign was estimated at 24 million kn (€3.2 million).

== Economic impact ==
By the end of 2023, the Ministry of Finance estimated a saving of around €160 million for the economy based on the increase in credit rating, a reduction in currency risk and removal of transaction fees. At the same time, the country adopted the euro during a spike in inflation, and may have caused a small increase in inflation. One study said that, while joining the euro had no "robustly significant" effect on overall inflation, it did substantially impact inflation in clothing, food, and hospitality: the paper attributed 46% of inflation from January and July 2023 for clothing; 33% for hospitality; and 16% for food to the euro conversion. The author suggested this was due to vendors rounding up when converting prices.

The Croatian Ministry of Finance estimated the cost of the changeover from the kuna to the euro to be around 2 billion kuna (approximately €266 million). Government analysis indicated that most of the cost would be on the loss of the conversion business by the banking system, which was expected to lead to a rise in other banking fees. There was a possibility of a general price increase for consumers, with a simultaneous general currency conversion risk for most debtors.

== See also ==
- Croatia in the European Union
- 2013 enlargement of the European Union
- Enlargement of the eurozone
- 2025 Southeast Europe retail boycotts
