= Croatian Nobles Square =

City square in Zagreb, Croatia

Coordinates: 45.8117°N 15.9834°E

Croatian Nobels Square
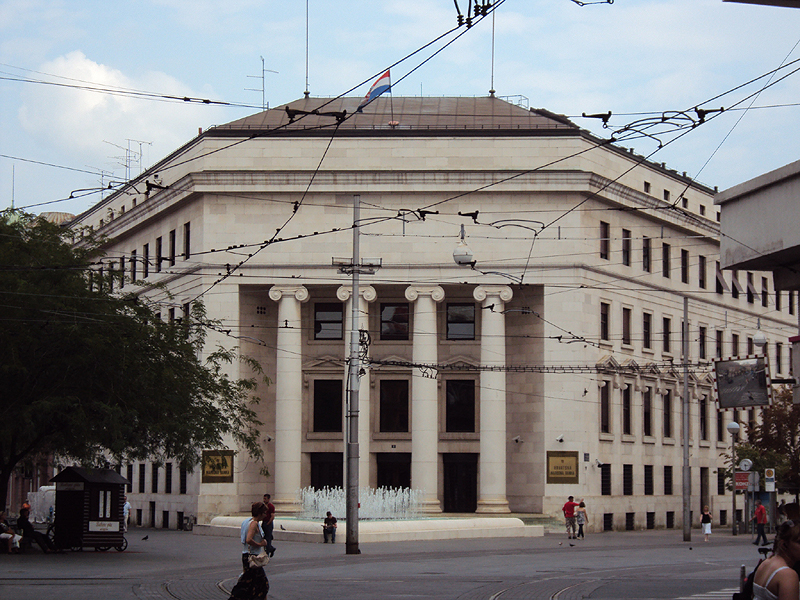
- Croatian National Bank at the centre of the square
- Interactive map of Croatian Nobels Square
- Native name: Trg hrvatskih velikana (Croatian)
- Former name(s): Trg Burze (1928); Trg münchenskih žrtava (1941-1946); Trg Joža Vlahović (1946); Trg Burze (1990); Trg hrvatskih velikana (2001 - )
- Type: Square
- Location: Lower town, Zagreb, Croatia

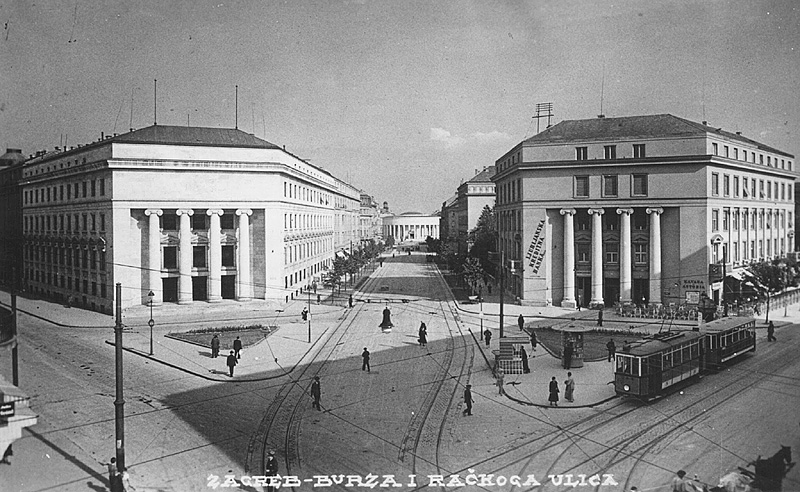
Croatian Nobles Square in the 1930s

Croatian Nobles Square (Croatian: Trg hrvatskih velikana) is one of the central squares in Zagreb. It was designed in 1923 urban plan as entry to the then new eastern part of the town. Draškovićeva street is on the western side of the square, Martićeva street begins on the north side, while a road and tram line go through the middle of the square to the Rački street and Square of the Victims of Fascism.

== About ==
Area of present-day square wasn't urbanized until the end of the First World War and was used as a fairground.

The square is formed by two symmetrically placed monumental palaces that were constructed in 1927; first is the Palace of the Exchange (work of architect Viktor Kovačić), today used by the Croatian National Bank, and the second Palace (work of the architect Aladar Baranyai), today used by the State Office for Croats Abroad.

The western side of the square consists of a four-store terraced houses that go along the Draškovićeva street. At the corner of the Jurišićeva street is 1929 residential-office-commercial building (work by modernist architect Bela Auer), and next to it is a 1931 building (work by architect Paul Deutsch). On the north side of the square on the corner of Draškovićeva street is a 1928 commercial and residential building Janeković (work by architect Hugo Ehrlich). Next to it is a series of buildings that continue to Martićeva street.

In 1995, square was decorated with two large triangular fountains in front of the building of the Croatian National Bank and the State Office for Croats Abroad (work of architect Mihajlo Kranjc).

== Former names ==
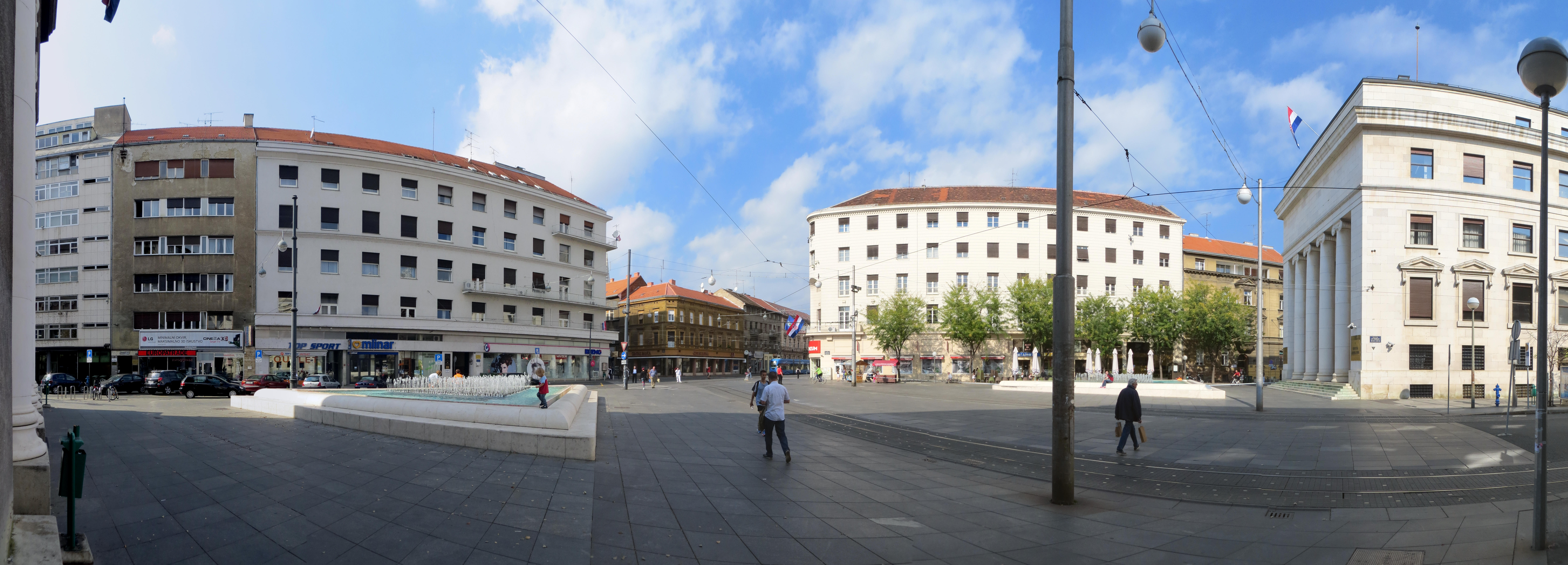

Being one of the most prominent squares in Zagreb its name was often changed in accordance to political circumstances of the time:

- 1928–1940 Trg burze (Exchange Square)
- 1941–1945 Trg münchenskih žrtava (Square of Munich victims)
- 1946–1989 Trg Jože Vlahovića (Joža Vlahović Square)
- 1990–2000 Trg burze (Exchange Square)
- 2001–present Trg hrvatskih velikana (Croatian Nobles Square)

== Literature ==
- Atlas of Zagreb (M-Ž). "LZMK", Zagreb 2006, p. 430.-431.
