= Croatian euro coins =

Designs of Croatian currency

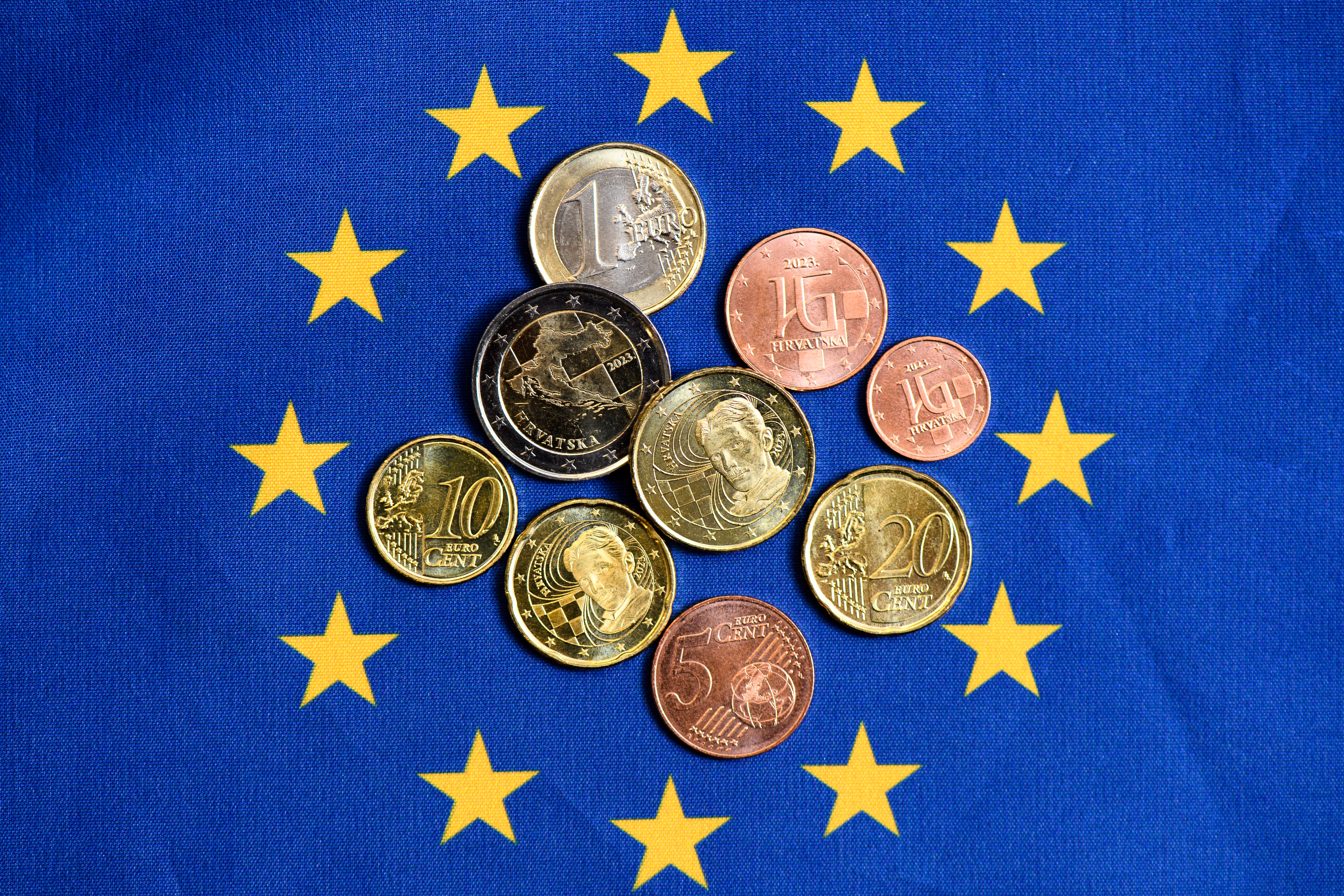
An assortment of Croatian euro coins in 2022, reflecting a variety of national symbols.

The Croatian euro coins are a set of euro coins being minted by the Croatian Mint since July 2022. They are the official euro coins with the national motifs of Croatia. The euro was introduced as a replacement for the Croatian kuna on 1 January 2023. The kuna and the euro were in dual circulation until 14 January 2023 in order to aid the gradual transition to the euro. Prices were displayed in both currencies from 5 September 2022 until 31 December 2023. The euro coins were made available for purchase on 1 December 2022. Each package cost 100 kunas (€13.28).

Remaining kuna coins could be exchanged in all banks, Croatian Post offices and the Financijska agencija until 31 December 2023. Since that period, only the Croatian National Bank (HNB) has continued handling exchanges. Kuna banknotes can be exchanged indefinitely, while the deadline to exchange kuna coins expired on 31 December 2025. As of October 2022, there were approximately €420 million coins minted with the Croatian national motif.

== History ==
On 21 July 2021, Prime Minister of Croatia Andrej Plenković stated that national identifying marks on the Croatian euro coins would be the Croatian checkerboard, the map of Croatia, a marten, Nikola Tesla and the Glagolitic script. On 4 February 2022, the Government of Croatia presented the designs for the national side of the future Croatian euro coins, which were chosen in an open contest by the Council of the Croatian National Bank. For the €2 coin, a design with the geographical map of Croatia by designer Ivan Šivak was chosen. The edge inscription uses lyrics from Ivan Gundulić's 1628 pastoral play Dubravka. For the €1 coin, a design with a marten (kuna in Croatian) standing on a branch, an animal after which the Croatian currency at the time was named, by designer Stjepan Pranjković was chosen. For the 10c, 20c and 50c coins, a design with Nikola Tesla, who was born in Smiljan (present-day Croatia, then-Austrian Empire), by designer Ivan Domagoj Račić was chosen. Finally, for 1c, 2c and 5c coins, a design with ligature bound letters Ⱈ (H) and Ⱃ (R) in Glagolitic script by designer Maja Škripelj was chosen. Each author received 70,000 kn (approx€. 9,300) for their chosen design.

After suspicions arose online that the design of the €1 coin used an unlicensed image of a marten on a branch by the Scottish photographer Iain Leach, the designer of the €1 coin, Stjepan Pranjković, withdrew his design on 7 February. On 8 February, the Croatian National Bank announced they will hold a new competition for the design of the Croatian €1 coin with a marten motif. On 4 May 2022, at the 15th session of the National Council for the Introduction of the Euro, the new €1 coin design was presented to the public. The chosen design depicts a stylised marten on a checkerboard background by artists Jagor Šunde, David Čemeljić and Fran Zekan. This new design was approved by the Council of the European Union on 20 April.

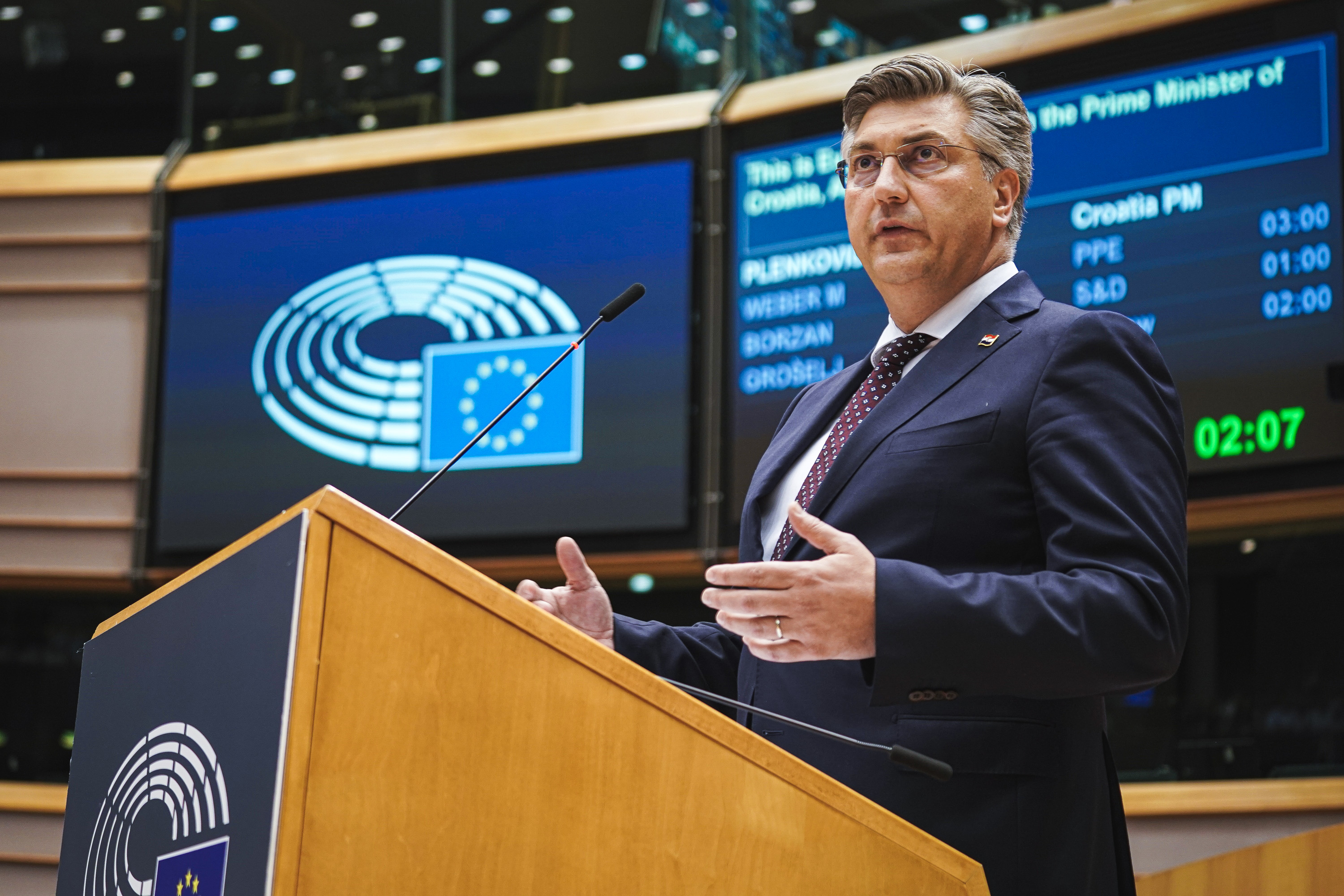
Prime Minister Andrej Plenković expressing support for the Croatian euro in 2022

On 18 July 2022, the Croatian Mint officially began the production of the euro coins with the Croatian national motif. Workers were set to have three shifts until the end of 2022. On 1 September 2022, euro banknotes began being distributed to all banks in Croatia. On 1 October 2022, the newly minted euro coins had begun distribution to all banks in Croatia. On 20 October 2022, the executive board of the European Central Bank (ECB) adopted a Decision on the application of minimum reserves by the ECB following the introduction of the euro in Croatia on 1 January 2023. From 15 December 2022 to 15 January 2023, there were no charging fees for cash withdrawals from ATMs to clients of other banks.

A transitional period for the imposing of minimum requirements on institutions located in Croatia took place from 1 January to 7 February 2023. Institutions located in other eurozone countries could have decided to deduct any liabilities owed to institutions located in Croatia from their reserve base for the maintenance periods from 21 December 2022 to 7 February 2023 and from 8 February to 21 March 2023.

Those who had both kunas and euros in credit institutions, unions, payment institutions, and electronic money institutions before the day of the introduction of euro had the right, until the end of February 2023, to close one or more of their accounts and transfer the funds recorded in those accounts to accounts of their choice in the same institution, free of charge. On 1 April 2023, the Croatian National Bank stopped determining denomination structure for paying out euro banknotes at ATMs. Until the end of June 2023, all banks had to return their amount in euros to those who had payment slips stated in kunas.

== Croatian euro design ==
For the design of images on the common side and a detailed description of the coins, see euro coins.

Depiction of Croatian euro coinage | Obverse side
€0.01	€0.02	€0.05
Ligature for Glagolitic letters ⰘⰓ HR, designed by Maja Škripelj
€0.10	€0.20	€0.50
Silhouette portrait of Nikola Tesla, designed by Ivan Domagoj Račić
€1.00	€2.00	€2 Coin Edge
		(Oh beautiful, oh precious, oh sweet Liberty, Lyrics of the Hymn to freedom, part of Dubravka by Ivan Gundulić)
Silhouette design of a marten, designed by Jagor Šunde, David Čemeljić, and Fran Zekan	Silhouette map of Croatia, designed by Ivan Šivak	(Oh beautiful, oh precious, oh sweet Liberty, Lyrics of the Hymn to freedom, part of Dubravka by Ivan Gundulić)

== Circulating mintage quantities ==
Face Value	€0.01	€0.02	€0.05	€0.10	€0.20	€0.50	€1.00	€2.00
2023	81,175,550	65,702,500	76,194,000	91,809,240	66,529,520	64,969,250	48,031,150	47,337,950
2024	1,081,506	1,080,006	1,080,006	1,040,006	4,500,006	1,020,006	1,020,006	1,000,006

== Commemorative coins ==
Croatian Cities series

Year	Number	Design	Volume
2024	1	Varaždin	
2025	2	Pula	
2026	3	Vukovar	

== Nikola Tesla design ==
On 21 July 2021, Nikola Tesla was selected to be featured on the euro with nearly 2,600 votes. This resulted in opposition from the National Bank of Serbia, on the basis that it "would constitute an appropriation of the cultural and scientific heritage of the Serbian people." Prime Minister Plenković commented: "If I were the head of the National Bank of Serbia, I would say well done." President of Croatia Zoran Milanović suggested a solution: "When Serbia joins the eurozone, let them recommend Tesla [as a national euro coin motif] as well. Everybody's happy."

Boris Milošević, one of the deputy prime ministers of Croatia at the time and a member of the country's Serb minority, praised the move, dubbing Tesla the "symbol that binds us (Serbs and Croats) to the whole world. The citizens of Croatia voted for a Serb from Croatia, who was proud of his people and his homeland, who always remained faithful to his culture—a typical Krajina, Prečani one—and now he is going to be on a Croatian euro coin as one of the recognizable symbols of the Republic of Croatia." On 4 February 2022, the Croatian government presented the new designs for the euro with national motifs of Croatia, including Nikola Tesla on the 10, 20, and 50 cent coins. This led to another wave of opposition from the Serbian media.

== See also ==
- Adoption of the Euro in Croatia
