= Vojta Braniš =

Croatian sculptor and art teacher of Czech descent (1893–1983)

Vojta Braniš (Bzenec, Czech Republic, February 2, 1893 — Zagreb, November 29, 1983) was a Croatian sculptor and applied arts teacher of Czech descent.

Vojta Braniš was born in Bzenec, south Moravia, then in Austria-Hungary, to the family of Emanuel Braniš, a chief gardener of the Božjakovina estate . In 1906 his family moved to Zagreb (also then in Austria-Hungary).

In 1948 he was appointed director of the newly founded Zagreb School of Applied Arts and worked there until his retirement in 1958.

Vojta Braniš died in Zagreb.

== Notable works ==
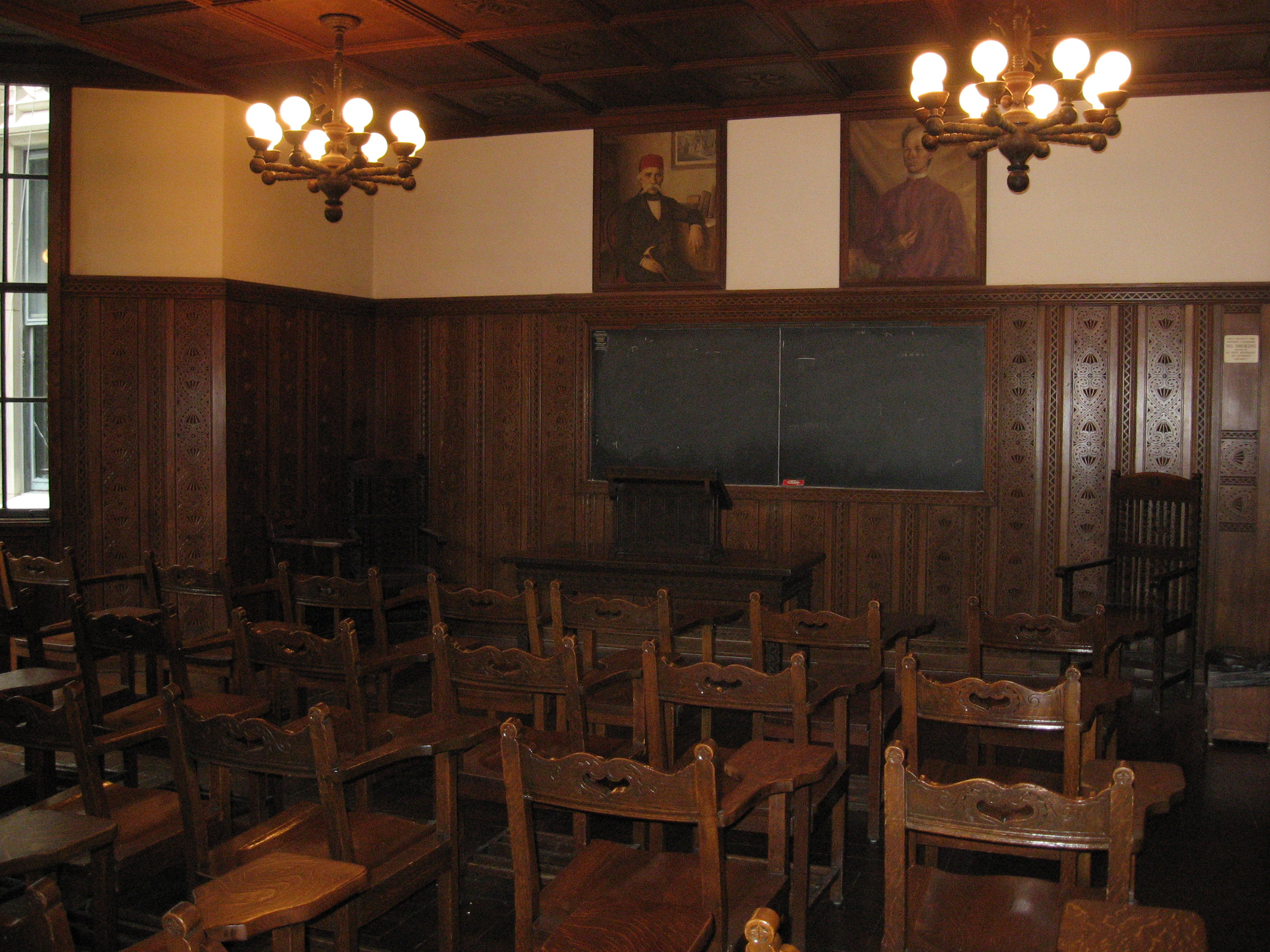
Yugoslav Classroom

- Elements of the Yugoslav pavilion at the 1925, 1937, and 1939 World's fairs
- 1916: The Nativity scene in the Church of Saint Blaise, Zagreb

A composition of colored wax with 150 figurines within the area of 3.5 m². It was inspired, according to the author, by the peasant life and folk art of the Božjakovina area. It was restored in the 21st century, with lighting added.

- Yugoslav Classroom in the Nationality Rooms of the University of Pittsburgh's Cathedral of Learning

== Awards ==
- 1925: Grand Prix for the oak portal of the Yugoslav pavilion at the 1925 World's fair, Paris
- 1965: ČSSR Gold Medal with Ribbon
