= Croatian kuna =

Currency of Croatia from 1994 to 2023

hrvatska kuna (Croatian)
- 500 kuna banknote

ISO 4217
- Code: HRK

Units of account
- Plural: kune (2–4) kuna (higher amounts, nominative); The language(s) of this currency belong(s) to the Slavic languages. There is more than one way to construct plural forms.
- Symbol: kn
- Subunit
- 1/100: lipa
- Symbol
- lipa: lp

Denominations
- Banknotes
- Freq. used: 10, 20, 50, 100, 200, 500 kn
- Rarely used: 5, 1000 kn
- Coins
- Freq. used: 5, 10, 20, 50 lp, 1, 2, 5 kn
- Rarely used: 1, 2 lp, 25 kn

Demographics
- Date of introduction: 30 May 1994
- Replaced: Croatian dinar
- Date of withdrawal: 31 December 2022
- User(s): Croatia

Issuance
- Central bank: Croatian National Bank
- Website: www.hnb.hr
- Printer: Giesecke & Devrient
- Website: www.gi-de.com
- Mint: Croatian Mint
- Website: www.hnz.hr

Valuation
- Inflation: 1.3% (August 2018)
- Source: Croatian Bureau of Statistics, September 2018
- Method: CPI
- Pegged with: Euro (EUR); 1 EUR = 7.53450 HRK

EU Exchange Rate Mechanism (ERM)
- Since: 10 July 2020
- Replaced by euro, non cash: 1 January 2023
- Replaced by euro, cash: 14 January 2023
- 1 € =: 7.53450 kn
- Band: 15.0%
- This infobox shows the latest status before this currency was rendered obsolete.

The kuna (pronounced [kǔːna]; sign: kn; code: HRK) was the currency of Croatia from 1994 until 2023, when it was replaced by the euro. The kuna was subdivided into 100 lipa. It was issued by the Croatian National Bank and the coins were minted by the Croatian Mint.

In the Croatian language, the word kuna means 'marten' and lipa means 'linden tree', both references to their historical use in medieval trading.

== History and etymology ==
Records exist from the Middle Ages of a tax and/or a currency in the then highly valued marten skins, which were recorded as marturina ("marten tax") or kunovina, in Lower Pannonia, modern day Hungary and Slavonia. Slavonia's first minted currency was the frizatik, but in the 13th century the Ban of Slavonia issued a marten-adorned silver coin called the banovac.

The idea of a kuna currency reappeared in 1939 when the Banovina of Croatia, an autonomous province established within the Kingdom of Yugoslavia, planned to issue its own money, along with the Yugoslav dinar. In 1941, when the Ustaše regime formed the Independent State of Croatia, they used the kuna as its currency. It remained in circulation until 1945, when Croatia became part of SFR Yugoslavia and the Yugoslav dinar became the official currency.

The plural form of kuna in Croatian is kune. It can vary because of different number declension rules (e.g. 2 kune, 10 kuna).

It has no relation to the various Slavic currencies named "koruna" (translated as kruna in Croatian), which means "crown".

== Modern currency ==
The modern kuna was introduced on 30 May 1994, starting a period of transition from the Croatian dinar, introduced in 1991, which ended on 31 December 1994. One kuna was equivalent to 1,000 dinars at a fixed exchange rate. The kuna was pegged to the Deutsche Mark from the start. With the replacement of the mark by the euro, the kuna's peg effectively switched to the euro.

The choice of the name kuna was controversial because the same currency name had been used by the Independent State of Croatia, but this was dismissed as a red herring, since the same name was also in use during the Banovina of Croatia and by the State Anti-Fascist Council for the National Liberation of Croatia (ZAVNOH). An alternative proposal for the name of the new currency was kruna (crown), divided into 100 banica (viceroy's wife), but this was deemed too similar to the Austro-Hungarian krone and found inappropriate for the country which is a republic, even though Czechia and (until 2008) Slovakia have used currencies whose names translate to "crown".

A long-time policy of the Croatian National Bank was to keep the fluctuations of the kuna's exchange rate against the euro (or, previously, the mark) within a relatively stable range. Since the introduction of the euro in 1999, the exchange rate between the two currencies rarely fluctuated to a substantial degree, remaining at a near constant 7.5:1 (HRK to EUR) rate. Croatia joined the European Union on 1 July 2013 and the Exchange Rate Mechanism on 10 July 2020 at a rate of 7.53450 HRK to €1.

The kuna was replaced by the euro on 1 January 2023 after satisfying prerequisites as the initial time estimate of standard four years after joining the European Union proved too short.

A two-week transition period during which kuna cash remained as legal tender in circulation alongside the euro ended on 14 January. Cash could be exchanged at any Eurozone national central banks until 28 February and at any bank (Fina and Hrvatska pošta in Croatia) until the end of 2023 at no charge. The Croatian National Bank stated that they plan to do the same for notes indefinitely and for coins until the end of 2025.

== Coins ==
In 1994, coins were introduced in denominations of 1, 2, 5, 10, 20 and 50 lipa, 1, 2, 5 and 25 kuna. The coins are issued in two versions: one with the name of the plant or animal in Croatian (issued in odd years), the other with the name in Latin (issued in even years). Overall more coins have been minted with Croatian names than with names in Latin.

Lipa is the Croatian word for linden or tilia tree, a species that was traditionally planted around marketplaces in Croatia and other lands under Habsburg monarchy rule during the early modern period.

Due to their low value, 1 and 2 lipa coins were rarely used. Since 2009, these coins were no longer minted, but the Croatian National Bank stated that it had no plans for withdrawing them, and the 1 and 2 lipa coins were still minted as non-circulating, mainly for numismatic collections.

Coins intended for circulation In each case, the obverse shows the coat of arms, state title and an indication of value.
Value		Technical parameters			Description			Date of issue
In Kuna	Equivalent in Euros (€)	Diameter	Mass	Composition	Edge	Reverse	First minting	Date of issue
1 lp	€0.0013272	17.0 mm	0.70 g	Aluminium-Magnesium alloy	Smooth	Maize, "KUKURUZ" or "ZEA MAYS", year of minting	1993	31 May 1994
2 lp	€0.0026545	19.0 mm	0.92 g	Aluminium-Magnesium alloy	Smooth	Grapevine, "VINOVA LOZA" or "VITIS VINIFERA", year of minting	1993	31 May 1994
5 lp	€0.006636	18.0 mm	2.50 g	Bronze-plated steel	Smooth	European oak branch, "HRAST LUŽNJAK" or "QUERCUS ROBUR", year of minting	1993	31 May 1994
10 lp	€0.013272	20.0 mm	3.25 g	Bronze-plated steel	Smooth	Tobacco plant, "DUHAN" or "NICOTIANA TABACUM", year of minting	1993	31 May 1994
20 lp	€0.026545	18.5 mm	2.90 g	Nickel-plated steel	Smooth	Olive branch, "MASLINA" or "OLEA EUROPAEA", year of minting	1993	31 May 1994
50 lp	€0.06636	20.5 mm	3.65 g	Nickel-plated steel	Smooth	Degenia, "VELEBITSKA DEGENIJA" or "DEGENIA VELEBITICA", year of minting	1993	31 May 1994
1 kn	€0.13272	22.5 mm	5.00 g	Cupronickel	Milled	Nightingale, "SLAVUJ" or "LUSCINIA MEGARHYNCHOS", year of minting	1993	31 May 1994
2 kn	€0.26545	24.5 mm	6.20 g	Cupronickel	Milled	Atlantic bluefin tuna, "TUNJ" or "THUNNUS THYNNUS", year of minting	1993	31 May 1994
5 kn	€0.6636	26.5 mm	7.45 g	Cupronickel	Milled	Brown bear, "MRKI MEDVJED" or "URSUS ARCTOS", year of minting	1993	31 May 1994

For table standards, see the coin specification table.

=== Commemorative coins ===
Commemorative coins of the Croatian were issued between 1995 and 2022.

Denomination	Obverse Design	Date of issue	Quantity
1 lipa	Maize with inscriptions FAO (Food and Agriculture Organization of the United Nations), 1945 (year of FAO founding), 1995 (50th anniversary of FAO and issue year of coin) and fiat panis (Latin expression for "Let there be bread!")	15 July 1995	1,000,000
2 lipe	Emblem of the Croatian Olympic Committee with inscriptions 1996 (Olympic Games year and issue year of coin), Atlanta (host city of the 1996 Olympic Games) and Olimpijske igre (Croatian for Olympic Games)	1 July 1996	1,000,000
5 lipa	Emblem of the Croatian Olympic Committee with inscriptions 1996 (Olympic Games year and issue year of coin), Atlanta (host city of the 1996 Olympic Games) and Olimpijske igre (Croatian for Olympic Games)	1 July 1996	900,000
10 lipa	Emblem of the United Nations with inscriptions Organizacija ujedinjenih naroda (Croatian for United Nations Organization), 1945 (founding year of United Nations), and 1995 (50th anniversary of United Nations and issue year of coin)	1 July 1996	900,000
20 lipa	Olive with inscriptions FAO (Food and Agriculture Organization of the United Nations), 1945 (year of FAO founding), 1995 (50th anniversary of FAO and issue year of coin) and fiat panis (Latin expression for "Let there be bread!")	15 July 1995	1,000,000
50 lipa	Emblem of the Croatian Football Federation with inscriptions Europsko nogometno prvenstvo (Croatian for European Football Championship), Engleska (Croatian for England), and 1996 (European Championship year and issue year of coin)	12 June 1996	900,000
1 kuna	Emblem of the Croatian Olympic Committee with inscriptions 1996 (Olympic Games year and issue year of coin), Atlanta (host city of the 1996 Olympic Games) and Olimpijske igre (Croatian for Olympic Games)	1 July 1996	1,000,000
2 kune	Tuna with inscriptions FAO (Food and Agriculture Organization of the United Nations), 1945 (year of FAO founding), 1995 (50th anniversary of FAO and issue year of coin) and fiat panis (Latin expression for "Let there be bread!")	15 July 1995	500,000
5 kuna	Images commemorating the 500th anniversary of the printing of the Breviary of Senj in 1494	15 July 1995	1,000,000
25 kuna	Marking the completion of the peaceful reintegration the Republic of Croatia territory under the temporary administration of UNTAES	28 May 1997	300,000
25 kuna	Holding of the first Croatian Esperanto Congress, in Zagreb, on 31 May and 1 June 1997	24 June 1997	300,000
25 kuna	Marking the 5th anniversary (1992–1997) of the admission of the Republic of Croatia, as an independent and recognised state, into the United Nations Organisation	27 October 1997	300,000
25 kuna	Holding of the EXPO, the Lisbon World Exposition, with Croatia as first-time participant	26 June 1998	300,000
25 kuna	The introduction of the new monetary unit, the euro, in eleven European Union Member States	29 December 1999	300,000
25 kuna	Marking the year 2000, "the Millennium Year"	27 November 2000	300,000
25 kuna	The 10th anniversary of the international recognition of the Republic of Croatia, 15 January 1992 – 15 January 2002	4 August 2005	200,000
25 kuna	The Republic of Croatia becoming an EU membership candidate, 18 June 2004	4 August 2005	30,000
25 kuna	The European Bank for Reconstruction and Development Annual Meeting, Zagreb, 14 and 15 May 2010	12 May 2010	20,000
25 kuna	Signing the Treaty of Accession of the Republic of Croatia to the European Union, 9 December 2011	3 December 2012	20,000
25 kuna	The Republic of Croatia becoming a full member of the European Union, 1 July 2013	1 July 2013	20,000
25 kuna	The 25th anniversary of independence of the Republic of Croatia, 8 October 1991 – 8 October 2016	7 October 2016	50,000
25 kuna	The 25th anniversary of the admission of the Republic of Croatia to membership in the United Nations	22 May 2017	20,000
25 kuna	The 25th anniversary of the introduction of the kuna as the monetary unit of the Republic of Croatia, 30 May 1994 – 30 May 2019	30 May 2019	30,000
25 kuna	The 350th anniversary of the founding of the University of Zagreb, 1669 − 2019	4 November 2019	20,000
25 kuna	The Croatian Presidency of the Council of the EU 2020	15 January 2020	30,000
25 kuna	The 75th anniversary of the founding of the Croatian Association of Technical Culture, 1946 – 2021	23 June 2021	50,000
25 kuna	Marking World Children's Day, 20 November 2021	19 November 2021	50,000
25 kuna	Marking the opening of the Pelješac Bridge for traffic and road connections in the territory of the Republic of Croatia	26 July 2022	30,000

== Banknotes ==
The notes were designed by Miroslav Šutej and Vilko Žiljak, and all feature prominent Croatians on front and architectural motifs on back. The geometric figures at lower left on front (except the 5-kuna note) are intaglio printed for recognition by the blind people. To the right of the coat of arms on front is a microprinted version of the Croatian national anthem, Lijepa naša domovino (Our Beautiful Homeland). The overall design is reminiscent of Deutsche Mark banknotes of the fourth series.

The first series of notes was dated 31 October 1993. The 5, 10 and 20 kuna notes from this series were withdrawn on 1 April 2007, and the 50, 100 and 200 kuna notes were withdrawn on 1 January 2010, but remain exchangeable at the HNB in Zagreb.

New series of notes with tweaked, but similar designs and improved security features were released in 2001, 2004, 2012 and 2014.

kuna banknotes
Value		Dimensions	Main Colour	Description		Date of	
In kuna	Equivalent in euros (€)	Dimensions	Main Colour	Obverse	Reverse	Printing	Issue
5 kuna	€0.66	122×61 mm	Green	Fran Krsto Frankopan and Petar Zrinski	The Old Fort and layout of the old Varaždin castle.	7 March 2001	9 July 2001
10 kuna	€1.33	126×63 mm	Green-Brown	Bishop Juraj Dobrila	The Pula Arena and Motovun town layout.	7 March 2001; 9 July 2012	18 June 2001; 18 March 2013
20 kuna	€2.65	130×65 mm	Red	Ban Josip Jelačić	The Eltz Manor in Vukovar and the Vučedol Dove.	7 March 2001; 9 July 2012	16 August 2001; 18 March 2013
50 kuna	€6.64	134×67 mm	Blue	Ivan Gundulić	The Old City of Dubrovnik and its Rector's Palace.	7 March 2002; 9 July 2012	25 November 2002; 25 September 2017
100 kuna	€13.27	138×69 mm	Orange	Ban Ivan Mažuranić and the Baška tablet	St. Vitus Cathedral in Rijeka and its layout.	7 March 2002; 9 July 2012	3 June 2002; 1 July 2013
200 kuna	€26.54	142×71 mm	Brown	Stjepan Radić	The old General Command building in Osijek and layout of the City-fortress of Tvrđa.	7 March 2002; 9 July 2012	12 August 2002; 1 July 2013
500 kuna	€66.36	146×73 mm	Olive green	Marko Marulić	Diocletian's Palace in Split and the motif of Croatian ruler from 11th century.	31 October 1993	30 May 1994
1000 kuna	€132.72	150×75 mm	Blue-Red-Grey	Ante Starčević	Statue of King Tomislav and the Zagreb Cathedral.	31 October 1993	30 May 1994
Commemorative issues in circulation
10 kuna	€1.33	126×63 mm	Green-Brown	Bishop Juraj Dobrila	The Pula Arena and Motovun town layout. (10th anniversary issue)	24 May 2004	30 May 2004
20 kuna	€2.65	130x65 mm	Red	Ban Josip Jelačić	The Eltz Manor in Vukovar and the Vučedol Dove. (20th anniversary issue)	30 May 2014	30 May 2014

For table standards, see the banknote specification table.

== Exchange rates ==
Euro exchange rate to Croatian kuna

Current HRK exchange rates
From Google Finance:	AUD CAD CHF CNY EUR GBP HKD JPY USD
From Yahoo! Finance:	AUD CAD CHF CNY EUR GBP HKD JPY USD
From XE.com:	AUD CAD CHF CNY EUR GBP HKD JPY USD
From OANDA:	AUD CAD CHF CNY EUR GBP HKD JPY USD

== See also ==
- Independent State of Croatia kuna
- Economy of Croatia
- Croatia and the euro
- Croatian euro coins

== Bibliography ==
- Granic, Stan (December 2008). "From Fur Money to Modern Currency: The Kuna" (PDF). Review of Croatian History. IV (1): 87–109.
- Krause, Chester L.; Clifford Mishler (1991). Standard Catalog of World Coins: 1801–1991 (18th ed.). Krause Publications. ISBN 0873411501.
- Pick, Albert (1994). Bruce, Colin R. II; Shafer, Neil (eds.). Standard Catalog of World Paper Money: General Issues (7th ed.). Krause Publications. ISBN 0-87341-207-9.
- Pick, Albert (1990). Bruce, Colin R. II; Shafer, Neil (eds.). Standard Catalog of World Paper Money: Specialized Issues (6th ed.). Krause Publications. ISBN 0-87341-149-8.
