= Marko Škreb =

Croatian economist

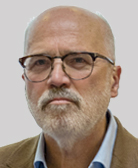

3rd Governor of the Croatian National Bank
- In office 1 March 1996 – 11 July 2000
- Deputy: Zdravko Rogić
- Preceded by: Pero Jurković
- Succeeded by: Željko Rohatinski

Personal details
- Born: 8 May 1957 (age 69) Zagreb, PR Croatia, FPR Yugoslavia
- Education: University of Zagreb
- Profession: Economy

Marko Škreb (born 8 May 1957) is a Croatian economist who served as Governor of the Croatian National Bank from 1996 to 2000.

Škreb graduated from the Zagreb Faculty of Economics in 1980. After spending time at the Boulder Economics Institute and University of Pittsburgh he returned to Zagreb and received his doctorate in 1990. In 1991 he started teaching at the Zagreb Faculty of Economics and in 1992 he became the director of the analysis department of the Croatian National Bank (HNB). In 1995 he was appointed President Franjo Tuđman's economic advisor and in 1996 he was appointed Governor of the HNB. His term ended in 2000 when he was succeeded by Željko Rohatinski.

After 2000 he worked for the International Monetary Fund and the World Bank and in that capacity advised the Central Bank of Albania and the Central Bank of Bosnia and Herzegovina. He also took part in their projects in Montenegro, Kosovo, Romania and Ukraine.

In September 2007 he was appointed Chief economist at Privredna banka Zagreb, which is the second largest bank in Croatia, part of the Intesa Sanpaolo corporate group.
