= Boris Vujčić =

Croatian economist

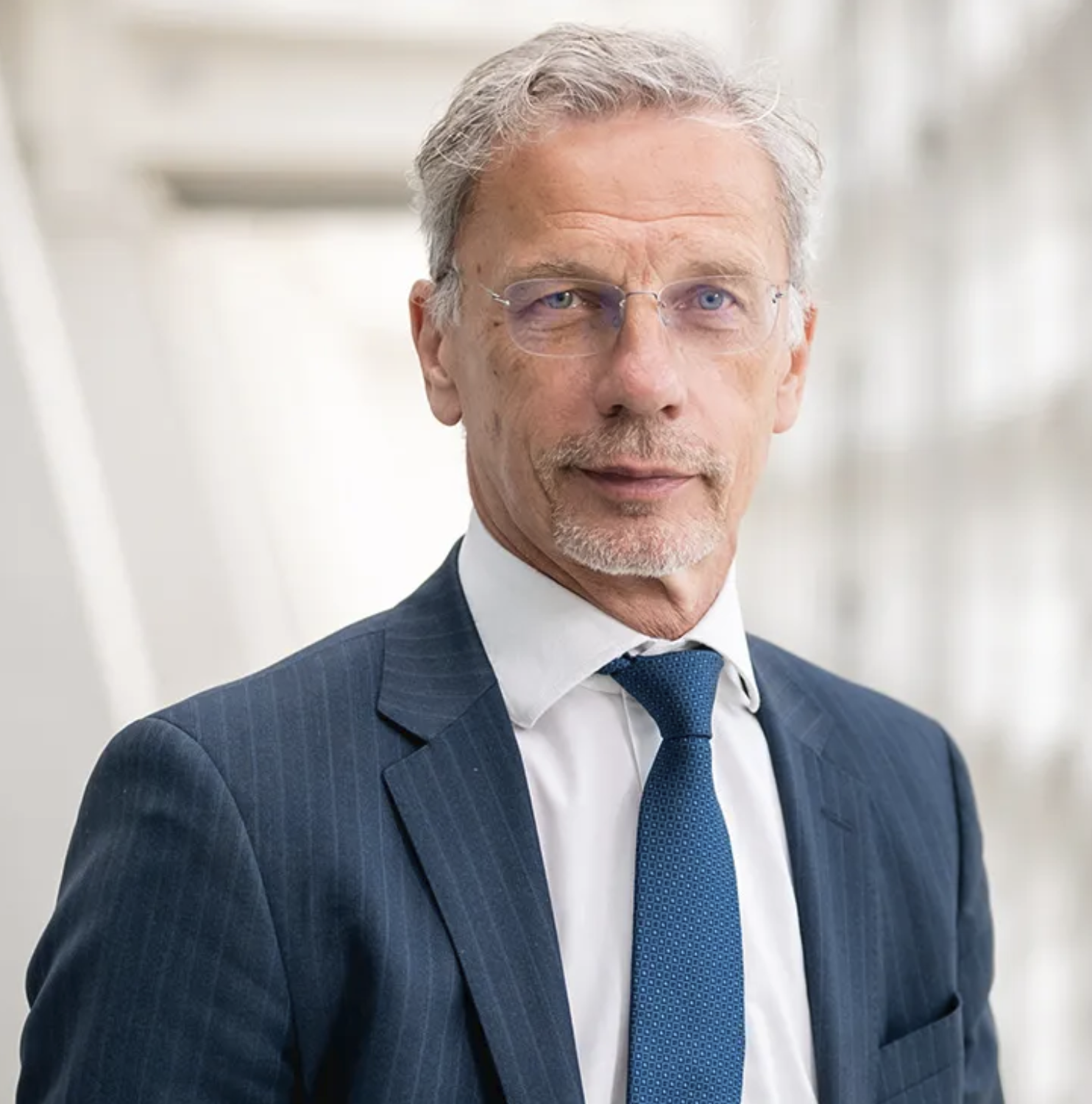
- Official portrait, 2026

Vice President of the European Central Bank
- Incumbent
- Assumed office 1 June 2026
- President: Christine Lagarde
- Preceded by: Luis de Guindos

Governor of the Croatian National Bank
- In office 8 July 2012 – 31 May 2026
- Deputy: Relja Martić; Sandra Švaljek
- Preceded by: Željko Rohatinski
- Succeeded by: Ante Žigman

Deputy Governor of the Croatian National Bank
- In office 15 July 2000 – 7 July 2012
- Preceded by: Zdravko Rogić
- Succeeded by: Relja Martić

Personal details
- Born: 2 June 1964 (age 62) Zagreb, SR Croatia, SFR Yugoslavia (modern Croatia)
- Spouse: Tanja Vujčić
- Education: University of Zagreb

Boris Vujčić (pronounced [bǒris ʋûːjtʃitɕ]; born 2 June 1964) is a Croatian economist, university professor, serving as Vice-President of the European Central Bank since June 2026. He previously served as Governor of the Croatian National Bank.

== Early life ==
Vujčić graduated from the Zagreb Faculty of Economics in 1988, where he also received his doctorate in 1996.

== Career ==
Vujčić started his professional career in 1989 as an assistant at the Zagreb Faculty of Economics. In 1996 he was named the head of research department of the Croatian National Bank. Later, in 1997, he became a lecturer at the Zagreb Faculty of Economics and in 2003 an associate professor.

Since 2000, Vujčić has held the position of Vice Governor of the Croatian National Bank, and in 2012 he assumed the position of the governor. He held that position upon Croatia's accession to the European Union. In 2018 the coalition government of prime minister Andrej Plenković agreed to re-appoint Vujčić for a second six-year term.

In January 2026, Prime Minister Plenković's government submitted Vujčić as a candidate to succeed Luis de Guindos in the position of Vice-President of the European Central Bank. On 19 January 2026, he won against Finland’s candidate Olli Rehn after three rounds of voting within the Eurogroup and was formally proposed for the position. The European Council appointed Vujčić on 19 March 2026 to a non-renewable eight-year term beginning on 1 June.

== Other activities ==
- European Central Bank (ECB), ex-officio member of the Governing Council
- European Systemic Risk Board (ESRB), ex-officio member
- Vienna Initiative 2.0, member of the Steering Committee
- International Monetary Fund (IMF), ex-officio member of the Board of Governors

== Policy positions ==
During Vujčić's time in office, the Central Bank's monetary policy has largely revolved around keeping the Croatian kuna stable against the euro in a managed float regime. Early in his term, he stated that it remained in Croatia's best interests to join the euro. However, he refused an international bailout scenario as the country faced the post-2008 financial crisis.

== Controversy ==
In 2014, Vujčić faced calls for his resignation from holders of loans denominated in Swiss francs who struggled with repayments when the Swiss franc surged that year.

In 2017, Croatia's State Commission for Conflict of Interest investigated whether Vujčić allowed a conflict of interest by several times attending an economic conference in Kitzbühel sponsored by UniCredit, the owner of the country's biggest commercial bank Zagrebačka banka.

In early 2022, Investigative journalists uncovered that over the previous twenty years more than 40 employees of the Croatian National Bank traded in securities of banks that the HNB supervised, allegedly including Boris Vujčić and his then-deputy. The revelation prompted investigations by Croatia’s market regulator. Vujčić denied wrongdoing and the Croatian National Bank stated that any trades did not violate laws at the time they were conducted and that Vujčić held no bank shares once such activity was outlawed.
