= Željko Rohatinski =

Croatian economist (1951–2019)

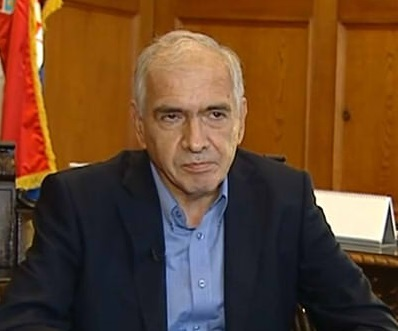
- Rohatinski in 2011

4th Governor of the Croatian National Bank
- In office 12 July 2000 – 7 July 2012
- Deputy: Boris Vujčić
- Preceded by: Marko Škreb
- Succeeded by: Boris Vujčić

Personal details
- Born: 3 August 1951 Zagreb, PR Croatia, FPR Yugoslavia (modern Croatia)
- Died: 12 December 2019 (aged 68) Zagreb, Croatia
- Children: 2
- Education: University of Zagreb
- Profession: Economy
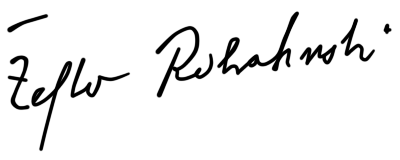
- Signature

Željko Rohatinski (3 August 1951 – 12 December 2019) was a Croatian economist who served as Governor of the Croatian National Bank from 2000 to 2012.

== Early life ==
Rohatinski graduated from the University of Zagreb Faculty of Economics in 1974, where he also received his doctorate in 1988 with a thesis titled Vremenska dimenzija ekonomske aktivnosti društva (lit. 'The Dimension of Time in Society's Economic Activities').

== Career ==
He started his professional career in 1974 as an intern at Croatia's Republic Bureau of Planning, and was appointed general manager of the Bureau in 1989. In 1990 he was appointed Head of the Macroeconomic Analysis and Policy Division at the Zagreb Institute of Economics, which he managed until 1998, when he became Chief Economist at Privredna banka Zagreb, where he worked until April 2000 when he took up the post of Director for Macroeconomic Analyses at Agrokor, working closely with Ivica Todorić. He left that post only three months later, in July, upon being appointed Governor of the Croatian National Bank by decree of the Croatian Parliament on 12 July to serve a six-year term. On 7 July 2006, he was reappointed for his second six-year term at the post. In 2012, after his mandate had finished, he returned to Agrokor as an macroeconomic analyst.

Rohatinski was a Fulbright Program fellow, and he authored a number of research papers, a book edition of his thesis titled Vremenska dimenzija ekonomske aktivnosti društva (The Dimension of Time in Society's Economic Activities), and he also co-authored the book A Road to Low Inflation (published in English by the Croatian Government in 1995, ISBN 953-6430-00-2).

In December 2008, Jutarnji list, a national Croatian daily newspaper, selected Rohatinski as Person of the Year, crediting him with the stability of Croatia's financial system during the 2008 financial crisis. In January 2009, The Banker, an international financial monthly published by the Financial Times, bestowed two awards on Rohatinski in their annual banking awards. Rohatinski won the Award for Best Central Bank Governor of Europe and the Best Central Bank Governor of the World.

In 2018, Rohatinski published a book titled Time and economics, and in 2019 Kriza u Hrvatskoj (Crisis in Croatia).

== Personal life and death ==
Rohatinski was married to Marija and had two adult children. In his spare time he liked to play chess and tennis. He was a fan of Alan Ford comics and The Rolling Stones, while his favorite movie was The Deer Hunter.

Željko Rohatinski died suddenly on December 12, 2019 at the age of 68. Shortly before his death, Rohatinski wrote an autobiography called Persona non grata. Commenting on his work ethic, Mato Crkvenac said that "He spared neither himself nor his family. He did not take care of himself or his health. He smoked a lot, which unfortunately turned out to be fatal..."
