= Church of Saint Blaise, Zagreb =

Church of Saint Blaise (Croatian: Crkva Svetog Blaža)
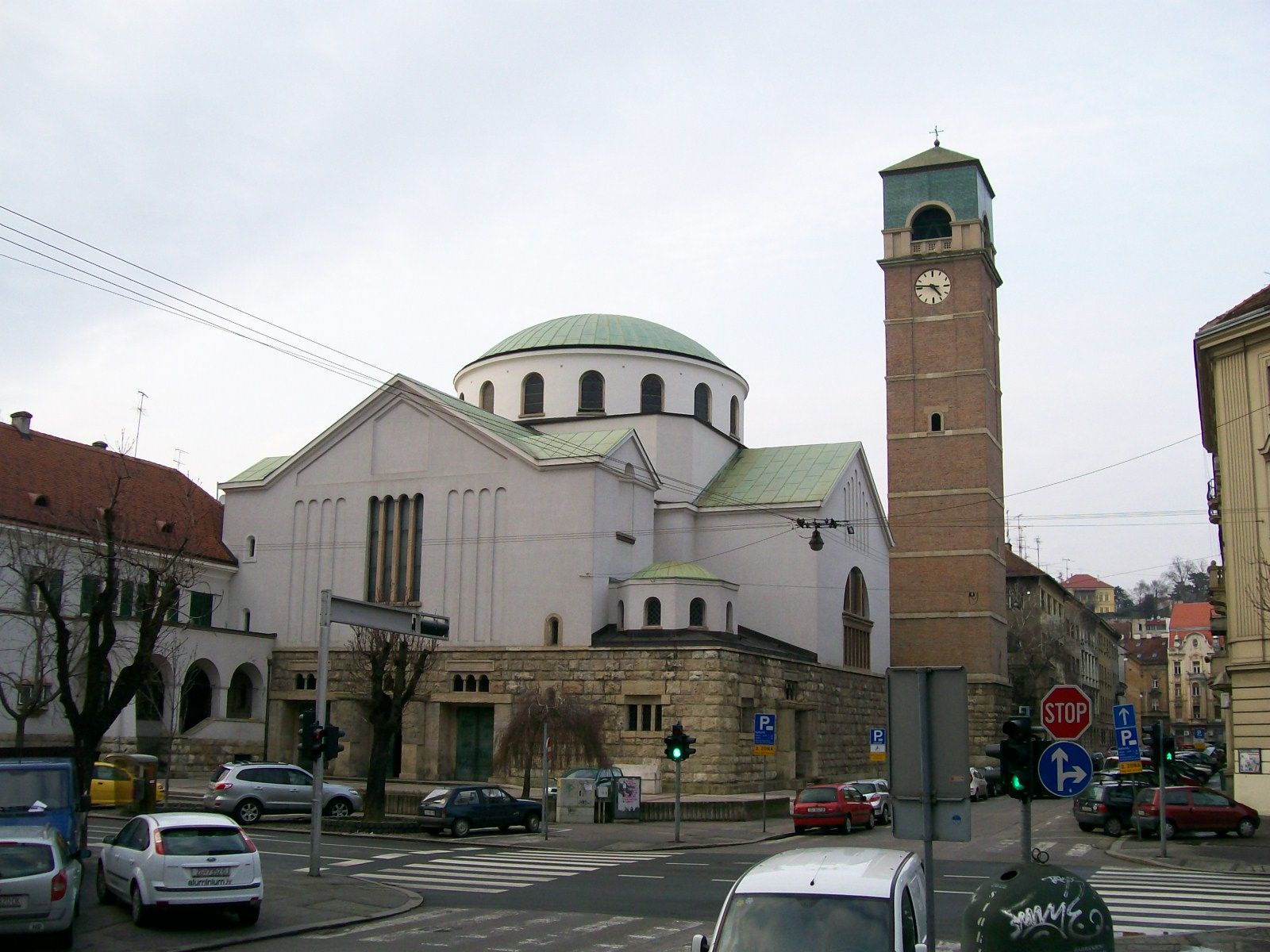
- Church in 2008
- Church of Saint Blaise (Croatian: Crkva Svetog Blaža)
- 45°48′39″N 15°57′41″E
- Location: Zagreb
- Country: Croatia
- Denomination: Roman Catholic

Architecture
- Functional status: Active
- Architect: Viktor Kovačić
- Groundbreaking: 1912
- Completed: 1915

Church of Saint Blaise (Croatian: Crkva Svetog Blaža) is a Catholic parish church located in the Lower Town of Zagreb, Croatia. It is dedicated to the Saint Blaise, and was designed by the Croatian architect Viktor Kovačić in the eclectic style. It is notable for its cupola, made out of reinforced concrete, first of its kind in the region.

== History ==
The parish of St. Blaise was founded by a decree of the Archbishop's Spiritual Table (Nadbiskupski duhovni stol) on April 1, 1915. The borders of the designated parish initially extended in the north from the parish of Šestine to the Sava in the south. At that time, the parish had about thirty thousand parishioners, and only fifteen years later the number of believers in the parish increased to 61 thousand. Due to the quality of pastoral work, the parish of St. Blaise was relieved by the establishment of the parish of St. Anthony of Padua, the parish of St. Joseph on Trešnjevka, the parish of Marije Pomoćnice of Christians on Knežija and the parish of St. Mark of Križevčanin on Selska cesta, and the youngest parish of St. Quirinus of Sisak on Pantovčak, founded in 1999. The idea of building a church and a rectory in this area arose in the 1870s with the occupation of the then prebendary Eduard Suhina. Various locations were mentioned as a possible site for the church: the Ciglana, in the axis of Kačićeva Street, then Ilički Square (today's British Square), the corner of Krajiška and Primorska Streets. As early as 1888, Prebendary Suhin donated prebendary land for the church. Twenty years later, a competition was announced for Primorska Street – Prilaz, and the winner was architect Viktor Kovačić with the project "DEO". At that time, Kovačić was staying in Ravenna, and under the impression of the early Christian buildings there, he conceived his central building. Construction of the church began in 1912 and was completed in 1915. Academician Ljubo Babić, in his work "Art among the Croats in the 19th Century", in a review of the Church of St. Blaise, writes that this church "was born on the road between Venice and Ravenna ... and it must be admitted that he (Kovačić) studied the source, but did not copy, but created an original architectural language for this church, albeit with someone else's words.

The church has a Greek cross ground plan, and is vaulted by a central dome of reinforced concrete construction, the first of its kind in the country, it was considered a technical achievement after construction. The architect was inspired by the architecture of Dalmatia (the Church of St. Donatus in Zadar, the church of the Holy Cross of the Župan Godežan in Nin from the 11th century, the Church of the Holy Trinity in Split from the 11th century, etc.) and by monuments of Byzantine architecture in Dalmatia. For Christmas in 1932, a marble altar decoration was installed. Like those in the church of St. Mary in Bijaći from the 9th century, and in the cathedrals in Poreč, Rab, Zadar, Trogir, Split, Korčula, Kotor and Zagreb, the baldachin stands on the main altar above the tabernacle in the middle of the apse, placed on four columns with capitals, which are decorated with 16 different symbols of religious character, and ends with a pyramid superstructure. On this ciborium, under the cornice with braided ornamentation, are carved the figures of saints mentioned in Croatian church history. Carved on the arches is the text of the prophet Malachi: "From the rising of the sun to the setting my name is great among the nations and in every place a pure sacrifice is offered to my name" (Mal 1, 11). Inside the baldachin is a golden mosaic with the symbol of the Holy Spirit. It is also worth noting the execution of the side altars of the Mother of God and the Sacred Heart of Jesus, as well as the relief of St. Anthony in the church's vestibule, carved in white Carrara marble by Prof. Ivo Kerdić. Inside the church is the chapel of St. Therese of the Infant Jesus from 1933. The altarpiece was made by the Croatian artist Mirko Rački and was donated by the family of Dr. Izidor Kršnjavi.

The beautiful nativity scene of the church of St. Blaise was completed on the Christmas Eve of 1916, according to the design of the sculptor Vojta Braniš, a student of Robert Frangeš-Mihanović. The sculptor also breathed some folk spirit into this sacred theme, thus creating the first type of Croatian nativity scene. The nativity scene, which bears the name "Croatian Christmas", was restored in 1969.

The organ was made by the famous company Heferer in 1911, and was installed in the church of St. Blaise in 1915. The organ was completely restored in 2003.

Aalong with the Zagreb Cathedral, the Baroque wonder - Church of St. Catherine and the Church of St. Mark, this church, with its architectural design and interior decoration (although still unfinished), is a sacral building in the city of Zagreb.

== Gallery ==
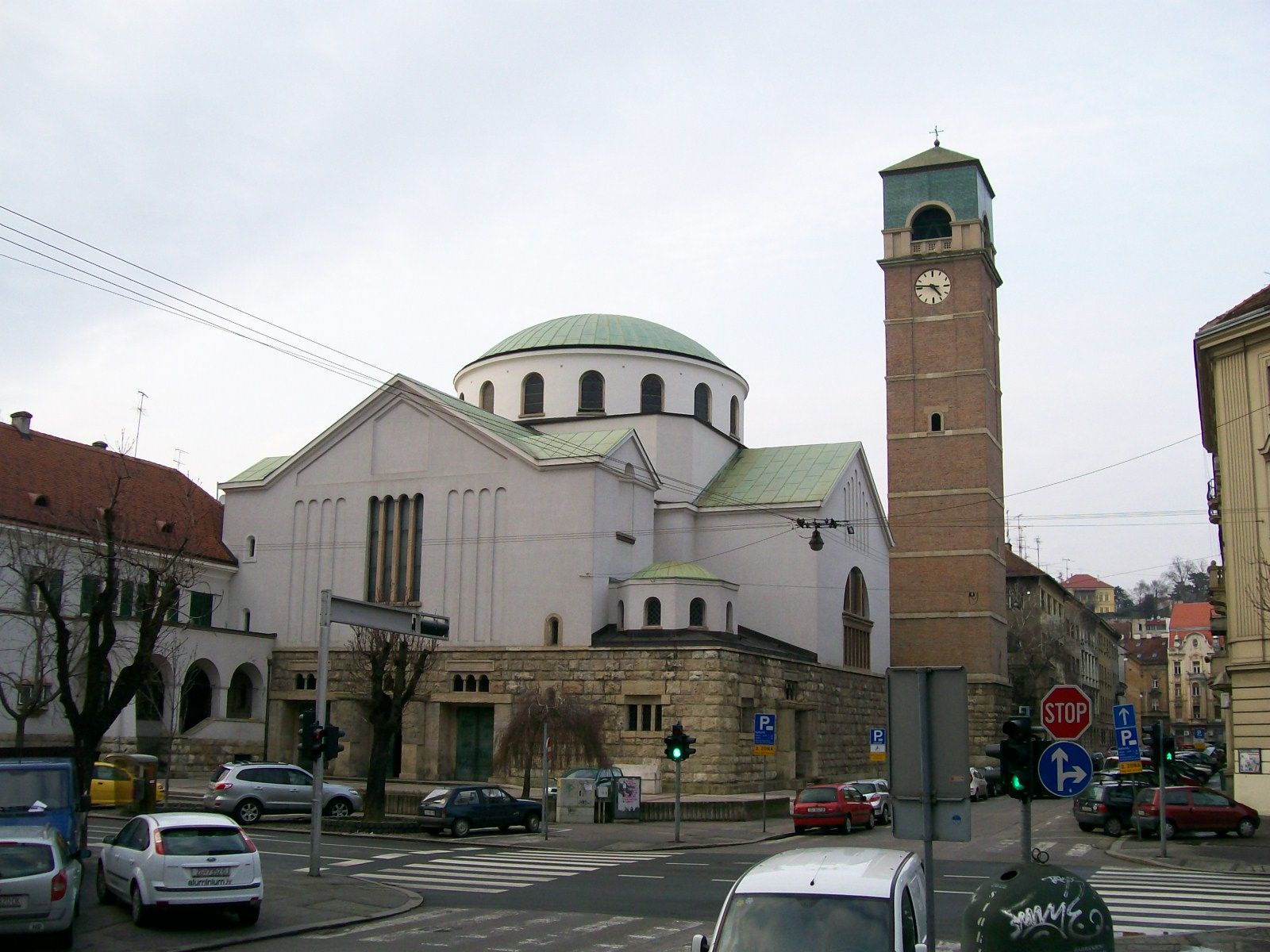
Church in 2008

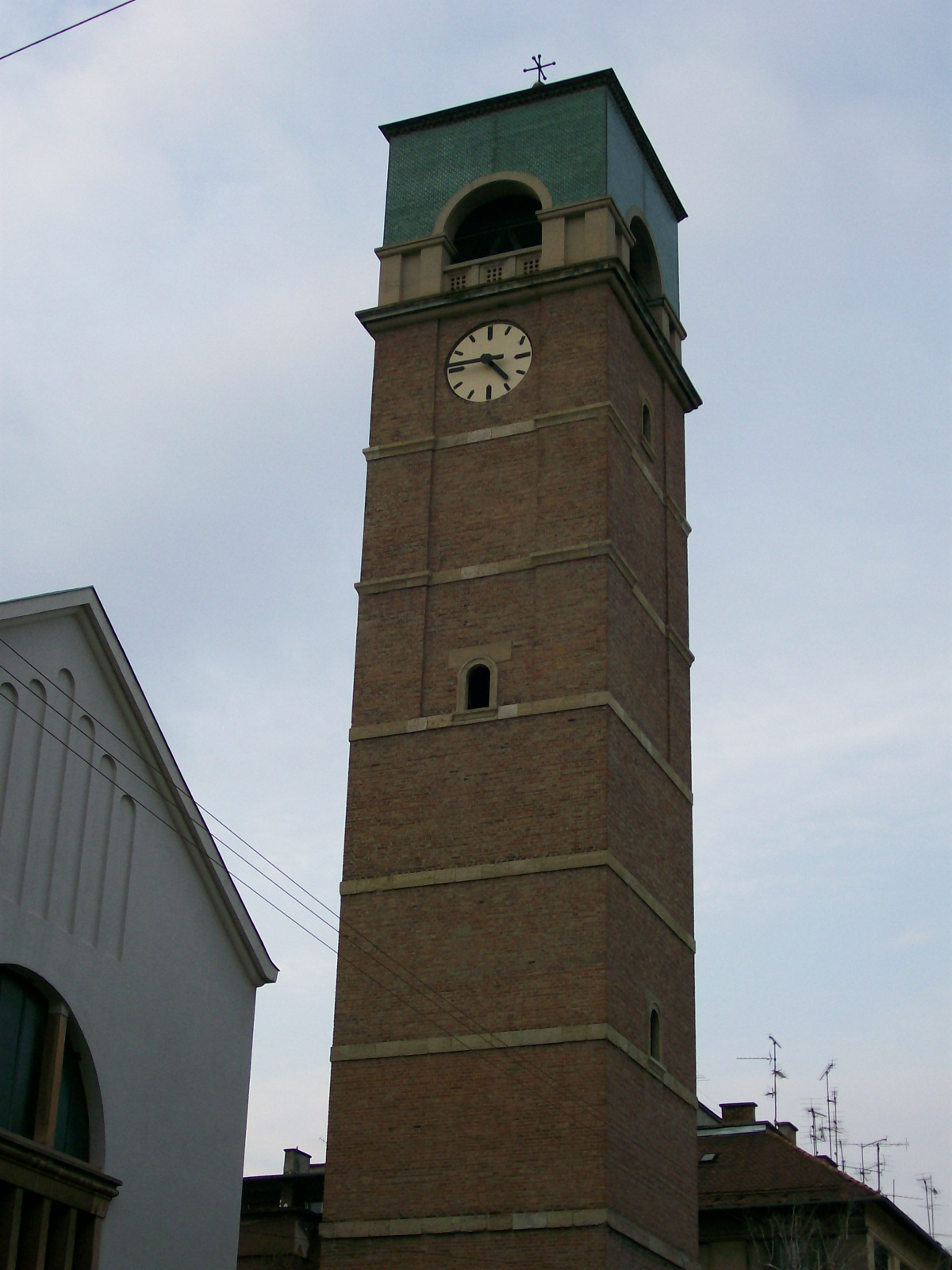
Tower bell

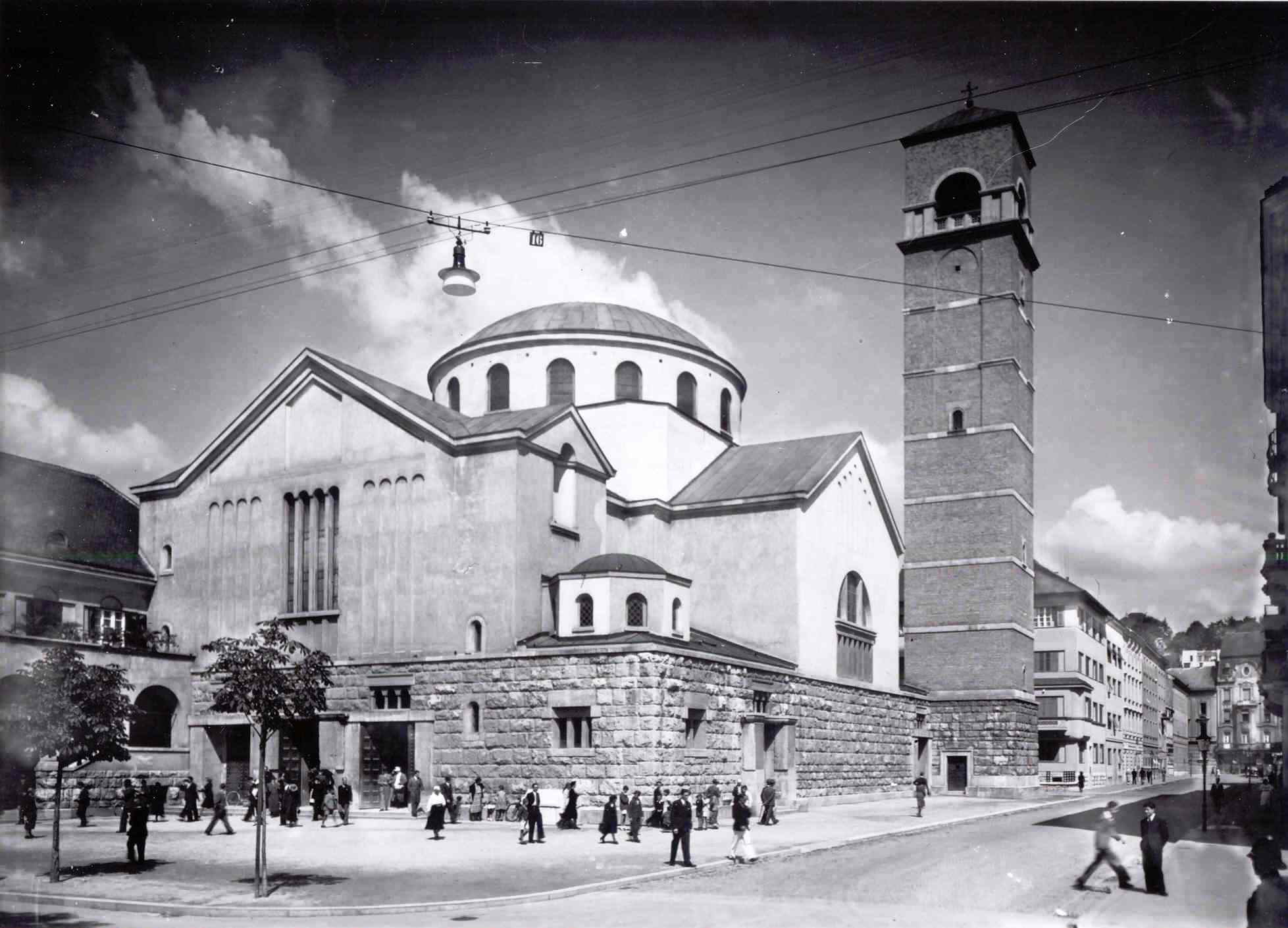
Church in 1930

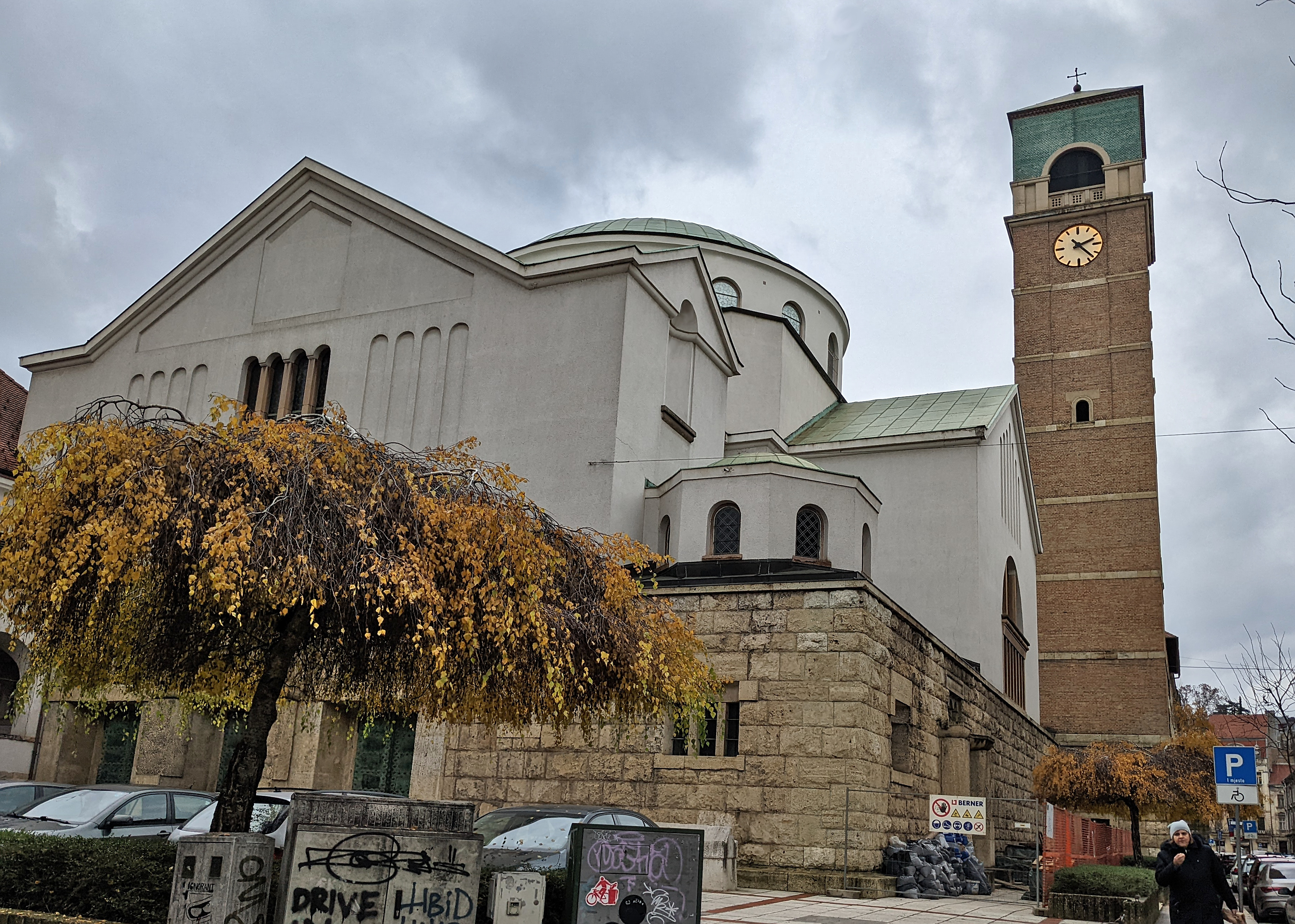
Church in 2022
