= Viktor Kovačić =

Croatian architect

Viktor Kovačić (1874–1924) was a Croatian architect and is often called "the father of modern Croatian architecture".

== Life ==
He was born in 1874 in Ločendol near Rogaška Slatina, present-day Slovenia. After graduating from the Crafts School in Graz in 1891, at the age of seventeen, he came to Zagreb where he was a trainee in local construction firms.

He studied architecture the Akademie der bildenden Künste in Vienna and opened a studio in Zagreb in 1899. He was co-founder of the Club of Croatian Architects in 1906. He worked at the Engineering College (Technical High School) in Zagreb from 1920, attaining a professorship in 1922. Viktor Kovačić died in Zagreb on October 21, 1924.

== Work ==
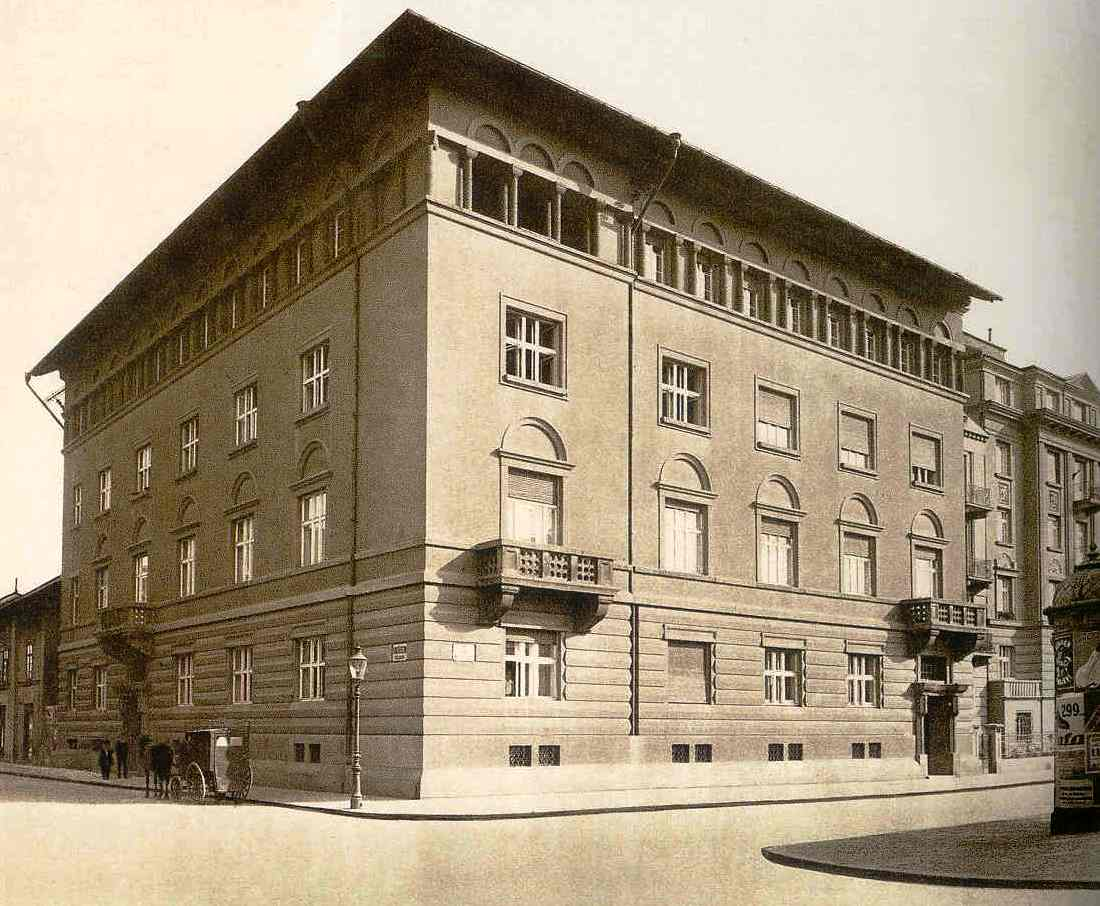
The Frank House (1913 - 1914)

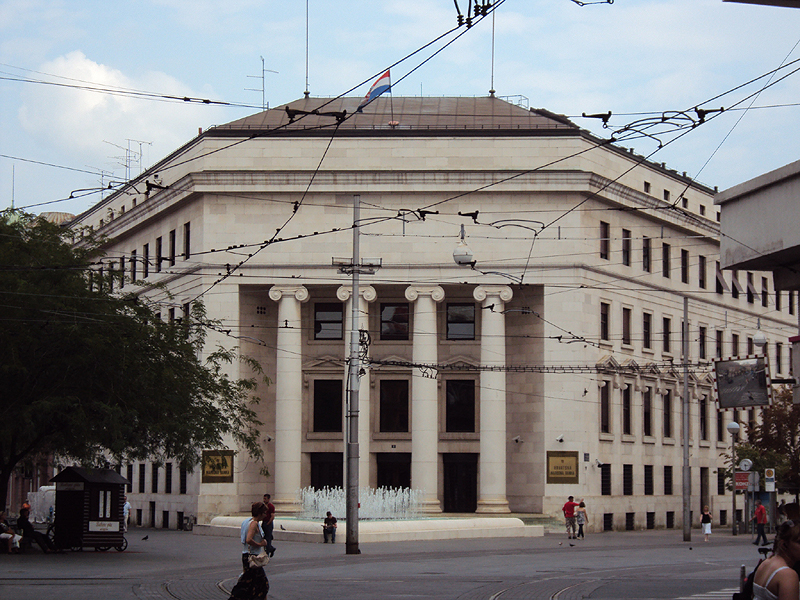
Croatian National Bank (HNB) in Zagreb by Viktor Kovačić, 1924.

The modern Croatian architecture appeared with Viktor Kovačić who was the first to speak against historicism and represented the idea that architecture must be individual and modern, but also practical and comfortable. From the thirties the works of “Zagreb school of Architecture" can stand alongside the best world architecture. They are especially interesting because of merging of two opposite directions in architecture of those days – functionalist and organic. His projects are marked with subtle purity of reduced elements of historicism, like in monumental Stock Exchange Palace (Croatian: Palača Burze, today the Croatian National Bank headquarters) in Zagreb, 1924.

His most important works in Zagreb are: the Church of St Blaise (1910-1913); the Stock Exchange Building (1923 - 1927); the Villa Frangeš (1910 - 1911); the Frank House (1913 - 1914); the redevelopment of Jesuit Square (with Hugo Ehrlich); the Villa Frölich (1919 - 1920); and the Slaveks Palace (1920).

=== Slaveks Palace ===
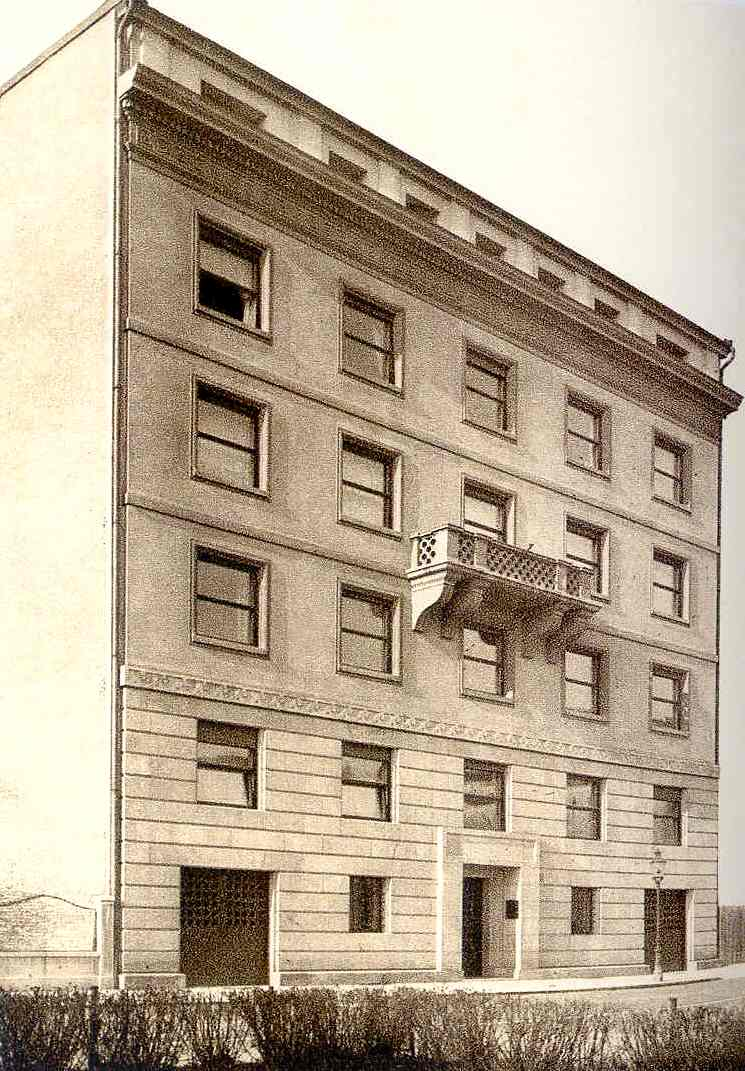
mini

Slaveks Palace is a residential house built in 1920 in Zagreb by Kovačić. House is located on Svačićev trg 13, Zagreb, Croatia. The house is registered as protected cultural asset by Republic of Croatia Ministry of Culture and media.

== Awards ==
In 1925, a year after his death, he was posthumously awarded a Grand Prix in Arts and Crafts on the Exposition Internationale des Arts Décoratifs et Industriels Modernes in Paris.

== Legacy ==
After the World War II the Life Achievement Award for architects in Croatia was named "Viktor Kovačić".

Kovačić's atelier in 21 Masaryk Street is exhibited to the public under the auspice of Zagreb City Museum. As of 2021, it is temporarily closed due to the damage caused by the 2020 Zagreb earthquake.

== See also ==
- Stjepan Planić
- Architecture of Croatia

== Bibliography ==
- (in Croatian) Biography
- (in Croatian) Detalji:MUO-020606: Kuća Slaveks, Zagreb, Svačićev trg: fotografija
