= Croatian Mint =

State-owned producer of Croatian coins

- Hrvatska kovnica novca d.o.o.
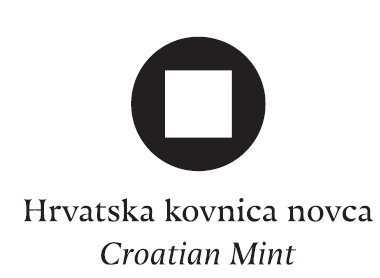
- Founded: 23 April 1993; 33 years ago
- Founder: Croatian National Bank
- Type: Limited liability company
- Registration no.: 080016733
- Headquarters: Sveta Nedelja, Croatia
- Coordinates: 45°47′59″N 15°46′51″E
- Products: coins, medals
- Owner: Croatian National Bank
- Chairman of the Board: Damir Bolta
- Website: croatianmint.hr
- Formerly called: Croatian Monetary Institute

The Croatian Mint (Croatian: Hrvatska kovnica novca), formerly known as the Croatian Monetary Institute (Croatian: Hrvatski novčarski zavod) is a state-owned enterprise, that produces circulating coinage for Croatia to conduct its trade and commerce, as well as gold and silver medals, commemorative medallions and badges in different metals, and license plates. It does not produce paper money.

The Institute was founded in Sveta Nedelja on 23 April 1993, and began production on 14 January 1994. On 2 January 2021, the mint announced that its new name would be the Croatian Mint.

On 18 July 2022, the Croatian Mint began producing euro coins with Croatian national motifs.
