= Croatian National Bank =

Central bank of Croatia

Croatian National Bank Hrvatska narodna banka
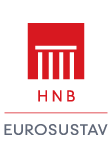

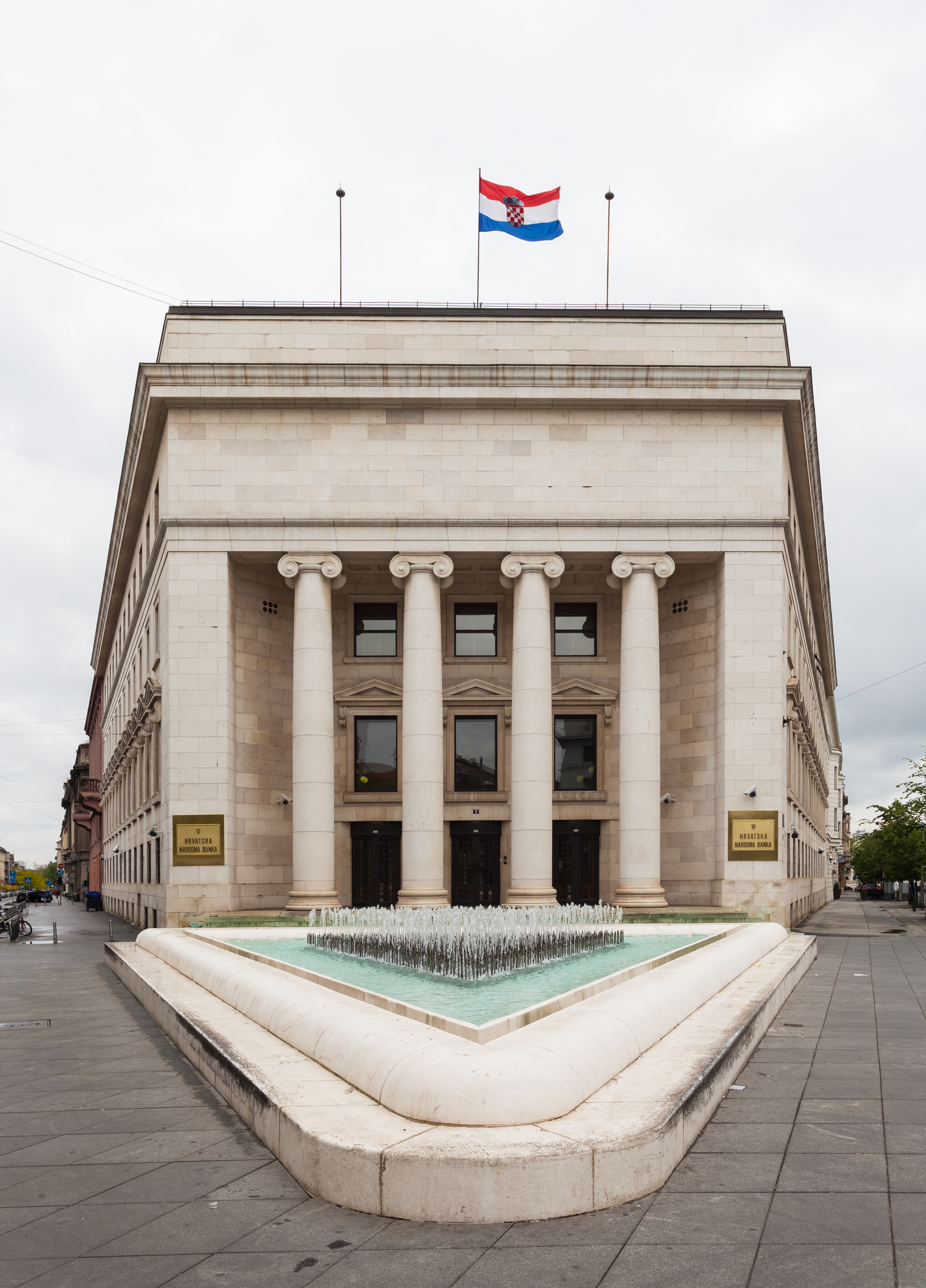
- Central bank of: Croatia
- Headquarters: Trg hrvatskih velikana 3, Zagreb, Croatia
- Coordinates: 45°48′42.95″N 15°59′04.52″E
- Established: 21 December 1990
- Ownership: 100% state ownership
- Governor: Ante Žigman
- Reserves: $14.54 billion
- Website: www.hnb.hr
- The Croatian National Bank still exists. However, monetary policy is now handled by the ECB.

The Croatian National Bank (CNB) (Croatian: Hrvatska narodna banka; pronounced [xř̩ʋaːtskaː nǎːrodnaː bâːŋka]), known until 1997 as the National Bank of Croatia (HNB) (Croatian: Narodna banka Hrvatske), is the national central bank for Croatia within the Eurosystem. Originally established in 1971 under the decentralization of the National Bank of Yugoslavia, it became a fully-fledged central bank in late 1991 with the independence of Croatia, and was subsequently the Croatian central bank until 2022, issuing the Croatian dinar until 1994 and subsequently the Croatian kuna until Croatian adoption of the euro on 1 January 2023. The CNB's role was specified by the Constitution of Croatia which was passed by the Croatian Parliament on 21 December 1990. In performing its duties, the CNB acts as an independent institution responsible to the Parliament.

In addition to its monetary role, the Croatian National Bank is also a financial supervisory authority. In that capacity, it increasingly implements policies set at the European Union level. It has been the national competent authority for Croatia within European Banking Supervision since 2020. It is a voting member of the Board of Supervisors of the European Banking Authority (EBA). It is Croatia's designated National Resolution Authority and plenary session member of the Single Resolution Board (SRB). It provides the permanent single common representative for Croatia in the Supervisory composition of the General Board of the Anti-Money Laundering Authority (AMLA). It is a member of the European Systemic Risk Board (ESRB).

== History ==
The National Bank of Croatia was originally established in 1971 as part of the System of National Banks which replaced the National Bank of Yugoslavia (NBJ) as Yugoslavia's collective monetary authority.

On 21 December 1990, the Constitution of Croatia, determined in article 53, named the National Bank as Croatia's central bank, and declared its responsibilities: "The National Bank is central bank of Republic of Croatia. The National Bank is responsible, within its rights and duties, for stability of the currency and for liquidity of payments in state and abroad. The National Bank is independent in its activity and responsible to Croatian Parliament. Profits made by National Bank belong to Croatian state budget. The position of the National Bank is established by law." In accordance with that provision, the National Bank was established under Croatian Law by Government Regulation of 23 December 1991, a provisional act made permanent by legislation of November 1992.

In June 1995, even before the Croatian War of Independence had come to an end, the National Bank organized the first Dubrovnik Economic Conference (DEC), an annual event that has been held without interruption since then, including in 2020 during the COVID-19 pandemic.

By amendments of Constitution of Croatia in 1997, the Bank's earlier name National Bank of Croatia (Croatian: Narodna banka Hrvatske) was changed to Croatian National Bank (Croatian: Hrvatska narodna banka). Also in 1997, the CNB became a full member of the Bank for International Settlements; Banking sector restructuring occurred throughout the 1990s, culminating in the resignation of all members of the CNB's Council led by Governor Marko Škreb in July 2000 in response to the Croatian Parliament's refusal to accept its report for 1998 and the first half of 1999.

Boris Vujčić joined the National Bank as head of its Research Department in 1996, became its Deputy Governor in 2000, and assumed the role of Governor in 2012. He held the position of Governor until his appointment as Vice-President of the European Central Bank in June 2026.

== Operations ==
The Croatian National Bank is the central bank of the Republic of Croatia and part of the European System of Central Banks. The primary objective of the CNB is maintaining price stability and the stability of the financial system as a whole. The Croatian National Bank executes monetary policy, manages international reserves of the Republic of Croatia, issues the Croatian currency - the kuna, issues authorisations of credit institutions, credit unions, payment institutions and electronic money institutions and supervises their operation. The CNB also issues authorisations of authorised exchange offices.

The Croatian National Bank is autonomous and independent in achieving its objective and carrying out its tasks. The CNB reports on its work to the Croatian Parliament.

=== Independence ===
The Independence of the central bank is a fundamental prerequisite for the effective and credible implementation of monetary policy and for achieving its primary objective: maintaining price stability.

The independence of the Croatian National Bank is in accordance with Article 130 of the Treaty on European Union, which guarantees the independence of national central banks of the European Union. There are several aspects of central bank independence: functional, institutional, personal and financial. Functional independence implies a clearly defined objective and autonomy in the choice of measures and instruments for its realisation. Institutional independence means that central bank decisions are independent from the influence of other institutions. Personal independence guarantees the protection of CNB officials from external pressures, excludes conflicts of interest and precisely defines the conditions for the appointment and removal from office of the Governor and other members of the CNB Council. Financial independence implies the possibility for the CNB to autonomously obtain funds for the purpose of executing its mandate, with the income and expense determined by the monetary policy stance.

=== Monetary stability ===
Stable prices is the main criteria for monetary stability. Stable prices are maintained by making sure price increases meet the Government's inflation target.

=== Financial stability ===
Maintaining financial stability involves protecting against threats to the whole financial system. Threats are detected by the Bank's surveillance and market intelligence functions. The threats are then dealt with through financial and other operations. The Bank works together with other institutions to secure both monetary and financial stability.

== Head office building ==
The seat of the CNB in central Zagreb, designed by architect Viktor Kovačić, was erected for the Zagreb Stock and Commodity Exchange and inaugurated in 1927. It has been used by the National Bank of Yugoslavia, then by the National Bank of Croatia since the end of World War II.

== Governors ==
=== National Bank of Croatia ===
National Bank of Croatia from its founding until December 1991 functioned as subsidiary of National Bank of Yugoslavia.

No.	Name	Term Start	Term End	Notes
—	Isak Drutter	1 January 1972	23 January 1978	Subsidiary Governor
—	Jovo Galić	24 January 1978	23 August 1990	Last Governor under the Yugoslav central banking system.

=== National Bank of Croatia ===
No.	Portrait	Name	Term Start	Term End	Notes
1		Ante Čičin-Šain	24 August 1990	31 May 1992	First Governor of the independent bank; introduced the Croatian dinar.
2		Pero Jurković	1 June 1992	29 February 1996	Overseer of the introduction of the Croatian kuna in 1994.

=== Croatian National Bank ===
No.	Portrait	Name	Term Start	Term End	Notes
3		Marko Škreb	1 March 1996	11 July 2000	Led the bank during the official name change to HNB in 1997.
4		Željko Rohatinski	12 July 2000	7 July 2012	Served two terms.
5		Boris Vujčić	8 July 2012	31 May 2026	Overseer of the introduction of the Euro in 2023. Serving as ECB Vice-President since 1 June 2026.
—		Sandra Švaljek	1 June 2026	19 June 2026	Deputy Governor of the Croatian National Bank
6		Ante Žigman	19 June 2026	Incumbent	Served as the President of the Board of HANFA from 2018 until 2026.

== See also ==
- Economy of Croatia
- Slavenska Banka
- Croatian State Bank
- List of banks in Croatia
- List of central banks
- List of financial supervisory authorities by country
