= Bad bank =

Bank meant to manage illiquid resources

A bad bank is a corporate structure which isolates illiquid and high risk assets (typically non-performing loans) held by a bank or a financial organisation, or perhaps a group of banks or financial organisations.

A bank may accumulate a large portfolio of debts or other financial instruments which unexpectedly become at risk of partial or full default. A large volume of non-performing assets usually make it difficult for the bank to raise capital, for example through sales of bonds. In these circumstances, the bank may wish to segregate its good assets from its bad assets through the creation of a bad bank. The goal of the segregation is to allow investors to assess the bank's financial health with greater certainty.

A bad bank might be established by one bank or financial institution as part of a strategy to deal with a difficult financial situation, or by a government or some other official institution as part of an official response to financial problems across a number of institutions in the financial sector.

In addition to segregating or removing the bad assets from parent banks' balance sheets, a bad bank structure permits specialized management to deal with the problem of bad debts. The approach allows good banks to focus on their core business of lending while the bad bank can specialize in maximizing value from the high risk assets.

Such bad bank institutions have been created to address challenges arising during an economic credit crunch to allow private banks to take problem assets off their books.

The 2008 financial crisis resulted in bad banks being set up in several countries. For example, a bad bank was suggested as part of the Emergency Economic Stabilization Act of 2008 to help address the subprime mortgage crisis in the US. In the Republic of Ireland, a bad bank, the National Asset Management Agency was established in 2009, in response to the financial crisis in that country.

== Models ==
In a 2009 report, McKinsey & Company identified four basic models for bad banks.

- In an on-balance-sheet guarantee, the bank uses some mechanism (typically a government guarantee) to protect part of its portfolio against losses. While simple to implement, this situation is difficult for investors to assess.
- In an internal restructuring, the bank creates a separate unit to hold the bad assets. This solution is more transparent, but does not isolate the bank from risk.
- In a Special purpose entity (SPE), the bank transfers its bad assets to another organization, typically government backed. This solution requires significant government participation.
- Finally, in a bad bank spinoff, the bank creates a new, independent bank to hold the bad assets. This completely isolates the original bank from the risky assets.

== Examples ==
=== Mellon Bank (1988) ===
The first bank to use the bad bank strategy was Mellon Bank, which created a bad bank entity in 1988 to hold $1.4 billion of bad loans. Initially, the Federal Reserve was reluctant to issue a charter to the new bank, Grant Street National Bank (in liquidation), but Mellon's CEO, Frank Cahouet, persisted and the regulators eventually agreed.

A dumping ground for non-performing energy and real estate loans, Grant Street was spun off with its own five-member board of directors and about $130 million in Mellon capital; it was named for a main street in Pittsburgh which was home to Mellon Financial headquarters. It took no public deposits. Mellon shareholders were issued shares in both the good and bad banks on a one-for-one basis, as a dividend. After the Grant Street National Bank had fulfilled its purpose, issuing preferred shares and equity purchase contracts to finance the purchase of $1 billion in Mellon's bad loans at 57% of face value, then collecting what it could on the individual loans, it was liquidated and its employees quietly returned to Mellon Bank. Securities collateralized by the bank's assets were structured and sold by Drexel Burnham Lambert. The securities were divided into two tranches: Senior, which received an investment grade rating, and Junior which were high yield securities. Internally at Drexel they were nicknamed CLOWNS which stood for "Collateralized Loan Obligations Worth Nothing Securities". All bonds were paid off at full.

Grant Street's early investors made handsome profits; the bank was dissolved in 1995 after repaying all bondholders and meeting its objectives.

=== Swedish banking crisis of 1992 ===
The Swedish banking crisis of 1992 was the direct result of a combination of over-speculation in property assets and the exchange rate of the Swedish krona. By 1992 three of the four major banks were insolvent.

The Swedish authorities engaged McKinsey & Company to help design a solution, and chose to establish two bad banks, Retriva and Securum. Retriva took over all the nonperforming loans from Gota Bank and Securum took over the non-performing loans from Nordbanken, with the good bank operations continuing as Nordea. The government retained a significant equity stake in Nordea. Lars Thunell was appointed to lead Securum, supported by Anders Nyrén and Jan Kvarnström to manage its toxic book, at the time valued at sek 51 billion.

The performance of Securum has been analysed by many, such as Claes Bergström. While the figures are debated, depending on initial costs and the time frame the cost was no more than 2% of GDP (an extremely good result) and eventually both bad banks made a positive return. Nordea has been considered one of the strongest and best performing banks in Europe.

International commentators such as Brad DeLong and Paul Krugman have suggested the Swedish bad banking model be adopted internationally.

=== France ===
- Crédit Lyonnais (1994)
- Dexia

=== Finland ===
The Finnish banking crisis of the 1990s caused the collapse of two major banks, SKOP and STS Bank. The government founded the bad banks ("property management companies") OHY Arsenal and Sponda, which took over the bad debt. In 2015 Arsenal started the process of winding down by deliberately filing for bankruptcy. 200 million of remaining capital has been collected during the bankruptcy. However, Arsenal is still involved in court cases and may not be disestablished until they are complete. Sponda was privatized and listed in Helsinki Stock Exchange in 1998, and in 2012, all government-held shares were sold by their holder, the government's asset management company Solidium. As of 2016, Sponda operates and remains on the stock market.

=== Indonesia (1998) ===
During the Asian Financial Crisis which emerged in Indonesia and several other countries in Asia in 1997 and 1998, the Indonesian government established the Indonesian Bank Restructuring Agency (IBRA) as an official body to oversee the asset disposals of an extensive number of distressed banks.

=== Belgium ===
The 2008–09 Belgian financial crisis is a major financial crisis that hit Belgium from mid-2008 onwards. Two of the country's largest banks – Fortis and Dexia – started to face severe problems, exacerbated by the financial problems hitting other banks around the world. The value of their stocks plunged. The government managed the situation by bailouts, selling off or nationalizing banks, providing bank guarantees and extending the deposit insurance. Eventually, Fortis was split into two parts. The Dutch part was nationalized, while the Belgian part was sold to the French bank BNP Paribas. Dexia group was dismantled, Dexia Bank Belgium was nationalized.

=== US sub-prime mortgage collapse of 2008 ===
In early 2009, Citigroup dumped more than $700 billion worth of impaired assets into bad bank Citi Holdings. By 2012, the Citi Holdings bad bank represented 9% of the total Citigroup balance sheet.

In March 2011, Bank of America segregated almost half its 13.9 million mortgages into a bad bank composed of risky and worst-performing "legacy" loans.

=== India's Position ===
Parliament has to enact a legislation establishing the Bad Bank – by whatever name called – NAMA, PARA, or NAMC. The Government shall retain minority stake in the Bad Bank and invite the private investors to hold the majority. However, the Government should have a right to veto any decision of the Bad Bank. Professionals from various fields should be made part of the management and political interference should be kept to a minimum. The provisions of the Act with respect to acquisition/disposal of bank assets should override any other legal /contractual restrictions including any consent requirements. Valuation of the NPAs should be done by professional agencies and transfer price should not be more than long term economic value of the bad asset. Moreover, the Bad Bank shall not acquire the NPA, if its long term economic value is less than its market value. Safety net provision such as (i) lack of Government guarantees on its subordinated debt, (ii) ‘Claw back provision’ in form of a surcharge on banks, and (iii) purchase price involving an average haircut of 30% on large accounts.

=== Baltic crisis of 2008–2011 ===
Estonia, Latvia, and Lithuania joined the European Union in 2004, attracting an influx of foreign investment and launching a real estate bubble which burst during the 2008 financial crisis, leaving the countries saddled with foreign debt. Riga-based Parex Bank, the largest Latvian-owned bank, was vulnerable as it held large sums from foreign depositors (which began withdrawing assets around the time of Lehman Brothers September 2008 collapse) and was heavily exposed to real estate loans. Latvia's government took a controlling interest in Parex in November 2008, spinning off Citadele banka as a good bank in August 2010. The bad assets were left behind, effectively creating a bad bank with the original Parex Banka name and no retail depositors. The Parex "bad bank," its core retail functions stripped out by the 2010 split, gave up its banking licence in 2012 to become a professional distressed asset management company Reverta.

While the crisis was focused in the markets of Estonia, Latvia and Lithuania, it involved Swedish banks, so Sweden was also exposed. The Baltic Crisis was partly initiated by the global credit crunch, but it revealed questionable lending practices of all major Swedish banks. Swedbank was particularly exposed, given its 50% share of market and well over sek150 million of impaired loans. With the support of the Swedish authorities the new CEO of Swedbank, Michael Wolf, engaged bad bank specialist Kvanrnstrom, European Resolution Capital and Justin Jenk who lead the formation and management of Swedbank’s bad banking operations (Financial Resolution & Recovery and Ektornet). This work was part of wider revolutionary change at Swedbank. This bad bank’s creation was covered in depth and published in a book by Birgitta Forsberg. The steps by management and this team were instrumental in rescuing Swedbank and stabilizing the region’s economy. Today, Swedbank is considered one of Europe’s stronger and better performing banks.

=== United Kingdom ===
In 2010 the UK government established UK Asset Resolution, a state owned limited company to manage the assets of the two nationalised mortgage lenders Bradford & Bingley and Northern Rock (Asset Management). This bad bank manages a total mortgage book of £62.3bn (as at 30 September 2013)

In 2013, the Royal Bank of Scotland transferred £38.3bn of its worst loans to an internal bad bank. In 2014, Barclays Bank dumped the bulk of its commodities operation and fixed income business into an internal "bad bank" as part of a restructuring in which it greatly curtailed its investment banking activities.

=== Germany ===
Germany has several bad banks dating as far back as the 1980s, Bankaktiengesellschaft (BAG), owned by the Federal Association of German 'Volksbanken und Raiffeisenbanken' Co-operative Banks, Bankgesellschaft Berlin, Erste Abwickelungsanstalt and FMS Wertemanagement. The Erste Abwickelungsanstalt and the FMS Wertmanagement together hold 190 Bn € and 170 Bn € respectively from the failed WestLB and Hypo Real Estate.

=== Austria (2009) ===
Hypo Alpe Adria: Nationalised in 2009 by the Austrian government to avert a bank collapse, dismantled in 2014.

=== Spain (2012) ===
In 2012 the Spanish government granted powers to the Fund for orderly restructuring of the bank sector (FROB) to force banks to pass toxic assets to a financial institution whose role is to remove risky assets from banks balance sheets and to sell off the assets at a profit over a 15-year period. The SAREB (Restructured Banks Asset Management Company) has assets of close to €62Bn on its balance sheet.

=== Portugal (2014) ===
On 3 August 2014, Banco de Portugal, Portugal's central bank, intervened in Banco Espírito Santo (BES) by applying a resolution measure that split the bank in two. The bank was split into a healthy bank ("good bank"), Novo Banco, while the toxic assets remained in the existing bank ("bad bank"), which entered into liquidation in 13 July 2016.

== Some major conclusions from the experiences in Sweden ==
- By separating the non-performing loans from the banks, it was possible to start the process of focusing the banks back to lending. Trying to work out all the non-performing loans inside the bank only prolonged the healing process in the organisation and reduced the ability of the bank to lend more to the public and businesses.
- Repairing the balance sheet of the banks is only one important element to get the banks back to normal lending activities. The other major element is organisational processes.
- The organisational requirements are very different in a bad bank than in a normal bank. A good bank is a 'process' organisation while a bad bank is a 'project' organisation. The skill set and the emphasis on type of skills are different in a restructuring and winding up situation than in a lending situation.
- The first year of the bad bank determines its success. The challenge is the large number of non-performing loans in a wide variety of situations with regards to geographical location, type of industry, size and type of problem. If the bad bank does not quickly get control of the loans, a lot of value is lost and the capital requirements of the bad bank can change dramatically. To be successful, a well-defined process on how to handle the different loans has to be established. This process has to be followed and managed with force and speed in the organisation. If not, the bad bank will easily end up in chaos.
- When a bad bank has gone through its credit work-out process, the remains of the bad bank is often asset ownership. Therefore, the bad bank in its life span changes dramatically from being at the outset basically a bank with a large number of loans to later in life a large asset-owning company. A common mistake is to think of this last phase of the bad bank as a kind of investment company. An investment company has very well defined objectives regarding what type of assets they want to acquire. They choose the assets they want to acquire. A bad bank gets all the assets that are left after the credit work-out process.
- A lifetime of 10–15 years is too long for planning purposes. The world changes substantially in such a long lifespan. Most banking crises are over in a 5–6 year period. A 5–6 year time span is the logical time to use for planning purposes and the timeline to use for winding down a bad bank.

All three bad bank structures have been deemed textbook examples of success. They resolved the toxic loans and made positive returns to the relevant stakeholders. This body of work has been referenced by governments and authorities around the world as best practice and some of its lessons applied (most recently in Ireland, Spain, Cyprus and Slovenia).

== Criticism ==
Critics of bad banks argue that the prospect that the state will take over non-performing loans encourages banks to take undue risks, which they otherwise would not, i.e. a moral hazard in risk-taking. Another criticism is that the option of handing the loan over to the bad bank becomes essentially a subsidy on corporate bankruptcy. Instead of developing a company that is temporarily unable to pay, the bondholder is given an incentive to sue for bankruptcy immediately, which makes it eligible for sale to a bad bank. Thus, it can become a subsidy for banks at the expense of small businesses.

== See also ==
- Bridge bank
- List of asset management firms
- Resolution Trust Corporation
- Troubled Asset Relief Program
