= Parex Bank =

Bank based in Riga, Latvia

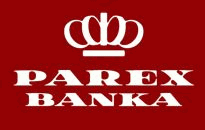

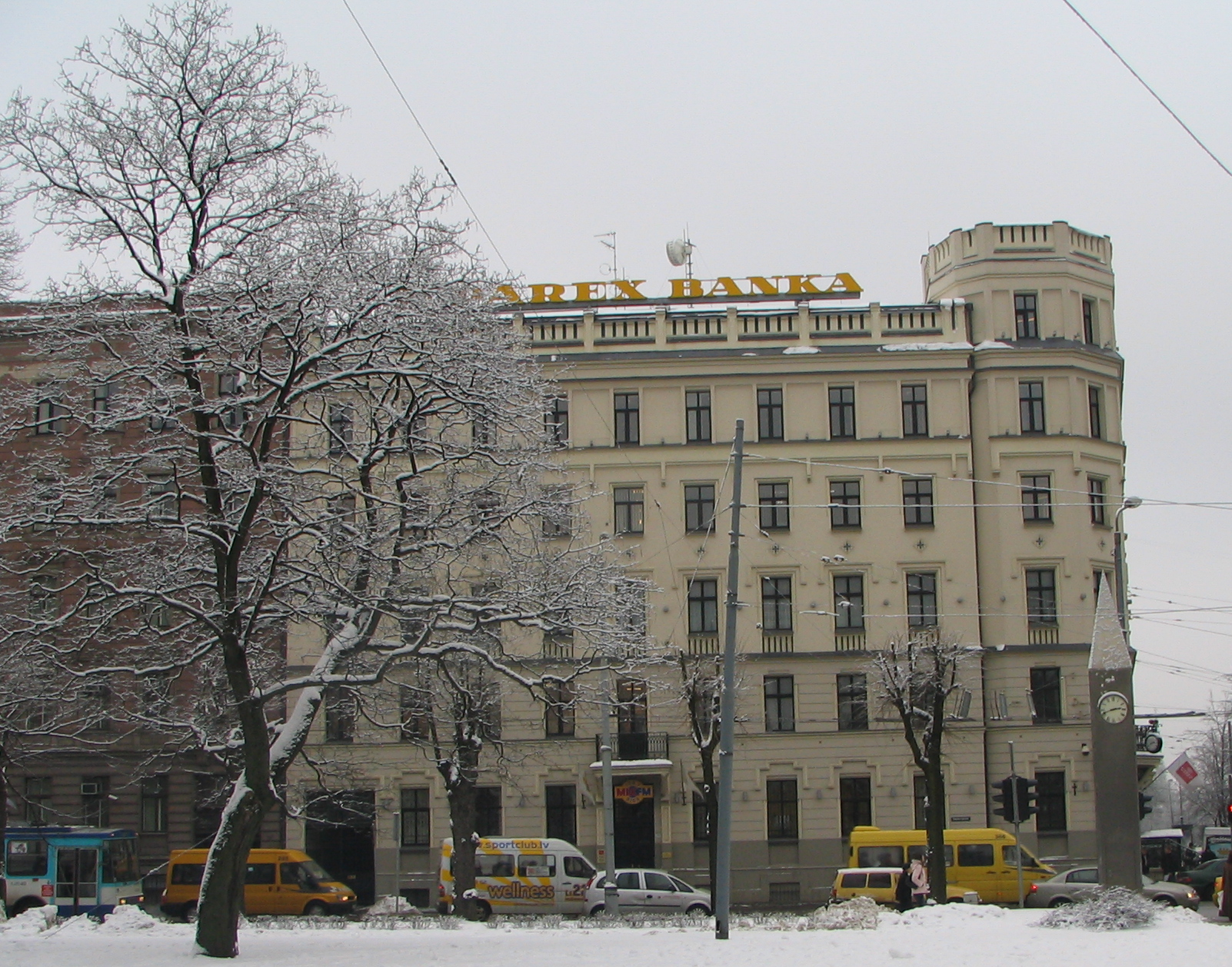
- Company type: Private company
- Industry: Financial services
- Founded: 1992; 34 years ago in Riga, Latvia
- Key people: Valērijs Kargins, Viktors Krasovickis
- Products: Banking

Parex Bank was a Latvian bank founded in 1992 by Valērijs Kargins and Viktors Krasovickis as a privately owned full-service banking company in Riga, Latvia that was very dominant in currency exchange in the 1990s. It had local and international clients in both the West and Russia with close ties to the Tambovskaya Russian mafia in St Petersburg and Vladimir Putin.

As the second largest bank in Latvia in 2008, its failure and state takeover was one of the major events of the 2008 Latvian financial crisis. On 1 August 2010, Parex Banka was split into a new bank Citadele Banka and Reverta, an asset recovery company. Citadele was then sold to a group of United States investors while Reverta sued the founders Kargins and Krasovickis for €88 million due to 14 highly irregular loans and deposits between 1995 and 2008.

== History ==
Valērijs Kargins

On 5 August 1986, under the Riga's City Committee of the Komsomol, Gints Marga created Parex, which is a portmanteau of export parity, as a self supporting youth enterprise. (Note: In the mid 1980s, Gint Marga felt that the Soviet Union needed to have "white cash". He had studied economics and especially post war Germany where there had been a convertible Mark and wanted to facilitate more "white cash" into the Soviet Union.) Valērijs Kargins had been working at VEF but could not live on its salary so, in 1987, he purchased for five thousand Soviet roubles the Parex shell which was later reorganized into a cooperative and then a limited liability company for tourism. After Kargins had travelled to Yugoslavia in 1985, then Vietnam, and then the United Kingdom in 1988 where he facilitated an exchange between Riga and Durham for youth tourist groups, he realized that he needed to establish a currency exchange among groups from France and the United Kingdom in Latvia. The first youth group to exchange currency at Parex was from Czechoslovakia. In 1988, he and Viktors Krasovickis, who had a tourism agency, became partners in Parex.

On 3 April 1991, Parex Bank received the first licence issued to a private company for currency exchange operations in the territory of the Soviet Union – issued by the second President of the Bank of Latvia, Paul Sakss. In May, Parex opened the first exchange office which was used by many clients from all over USSR. (Note: After May 1991, only licensed banks were allowed to exchange currency.)

On 13 August 1991, Kargins, along with Viktors Krasovickis and his wife Nina Kondratyev reorganized Parex and became the new bank AS PAREX's sole owners. Kargins owned half of the shares (valued at 1,086,200 Soviet roubles), while the remaining 50% were distributed in similar amounts between Viktors Krosovickis and his wife. (Note: Viktors Krasovickis (also spelled Viktor Krasovitsky) (Russian: Виктор Красовицкий b. 1954) graduated from the Riga Polytechnic Institute as a specialist in automation and telemechanics. He worked at Komutator in Riga and later in a travel and excursion agency. Later, he created his own travel agency. His wife Nina Kondratyev was a software engineer.)

In January 1992, Parex Bank was founded, with the owners Valērijs Kargins and Viktors Krasovickis having equal shares in the bank. Krasovickis' wife, Ņina Kondratjeva, did not participate in the bank`s future activities as they divorced that year. However, she continued to hold significant deposit in it.

Persons from all over the Soviet Union and later the former Soviet Union exchanged through Parex and, when the Russian rouble fell into the abyss of inflation, the Latvian rouble and later the Latvian lats were much more stable in which to exchange currency. Riga was intended to become the global financial center in the former Soviet Union and Parex Bank advertised that "We are closer than Switzerland!" (Russian: "Мы ближе, чем Швейцария!") (Note: Richard L. Palmer, president of Cachet International, Inc., was the CIA station chief at the United States Embassy in Moscow from 1992 to 1994. He has an extensive background in studying international money laundering and Russian organized crime and is considered an expert in these fields.) According to Kargins, Kargins and Krasovits were on friendly terms with Anatoly Sobchak and Vladimir Putin personally authorized Parex's Saint Petersburg office. In May 2015, Spanish prosecutors alleged that Parex Bank, which held mostly offshore deposits for persons from Russia, was the preferred Latvian bank for the money laundering of Vladimir Putin, Yuri Chaika, and Russian Mafia especially the Tambovskaya Mafia from Saint Petersburg and that very large sums were laundered for them through Latvian and German firms associated with Parex Bank and Overseas Services, which is a sister firm of Parex Bank, by Mikhail Rebo, also spelled Rabo, and his wife Tatiana Rebo who was the manager of the Parex Bank Berlin. Also, the Spanish prosecutors alleged that Grigory Rabinovich benefited from the looting of Parex Bank by receiving a fake unrecoverable loan which he received as a refund for his purchase of shares in Parex while United States and Swedish shareholders of Parex Bank received no money. Ilmars Poikans alleged that both Valdis Dombrovskis, who is a European Commission Vice President responsible for the integrity of the euro, and the Bank of Latvia Governor Ilmars Rimsevics, who is a member of the council of European Central Bank, supported the fraud at Parex Bank and that Rimsevics received a very large sum for his efforts.

In 1993, about 30% of Parex Bank's shares were bought by offshore company Europe Holdings Ltd and by the year 2001 its share (without voting rights) reached 51%. The company remained in the list of owners until 2002, when Kargins and Krasovickis formally repurchased parts of Europe Holdings Ltd, again becoming the sole owners of the bank. However, by the end of 2007, around 14% of the Bank`s total paid-in share capital was in the hands of 59 small shareholders.

Parex was closely involved with Enron, Arthur Andersen and later Ernst & Young prior to the collapse of Enron in 2002.

In the early 2000s, John Christmas, a United States banker who joined Parex in 2002 and was the head of the Parex's International Relations, informed the Financial Services Authority in London about a massive money laundering network involving shell companies with accounts at Parex but the Financial Services Authority took no action to stop the illicit affairs. In 2005, Christmas informed the Chairman of the Bank of Latvia, Ilmārs Rimšēvičs, (Note: In the early 2000s, Ilmars Rimsevics was a member of the Governing Council of the European Central Bank. He served as the top banker in Latvia beginning in 1992 as chairman and then had the top policy role of governor in 2001. As governor of the Bank of Latvia, he was the person that nominates the chairman of Latvia's banking regulator the Financial and Capital Markets Commission (FCMC). On 18 February 2018, Rimsevics was arrested by the Corruption Prevention Bureau (KNAB) for bribery and money laundering schemes including schemes involving Latvia, Ukraine, North Korea, and Russia.) that Parex was involved in money laundering schemes but Rimšēvičs took no action.

In 2001, Jānis Skrastiņš (30 October 1949, Liepa, Liepa Parish - 10 July 2021), who was the first Prosecutor General of Latvia serving from September 1990 to August 1998 and drafted Latvia's Law on the Prevention of Money Laundering in 1997 following the April to June 1995 Banka Baltija financial crisis and collapse, was elected to the supervisory board of Parekss Banka and became its legal advisor and headed the anti money laundering division of the bank until 2009. From 2004 to 5 August 2008, Skrastiņš was a member of the management board of Parex Bank.

In 2001, the ruling coalition of left wing groups at Riga, which were very close to the Kremlin, shifted all financial dealings with the mayor's office to Parex Bank.

On 7 May 2004, Parekss Banka changed its name to Parex Banka.

In May 2005, President George W. Bush travelled to Latvia to discuss Latvian banking irregularities. The Lithuanian branches of Parex were associated with pro-Russia, pro-Kremlin, and pro-Putin Viktor Yanukovych money laundering scandals with large support from the Donetsk Clan, which was formed by Akhat Bragin and headed by Rinat Akhmetov after Bragin's death on 15 October 1995, in the 2004 Ukrainian elections according to the Lithuanian newspaper Respublika. The United States branch of Deutsche Bank, Deutsche Bank Americas (DBA), had Parex's correspondent account, but shut it down after pressure from the United States Treasury Department.

A company called International Overseas Services (Russian: Международные зарубежные услуги) also known as International Offshore Services has had close ties to Parex. Established in 1996 in Dublin, Ireland but moved to Dublin, Virginia in the United States in 2007, International Overseas Services had subsidiaries in Riga, Kyiv and Moscow, had Philip Burwell (Irish: Pilip Boireil) listed as its representative in Latvia, and had dummy directors. IOSG Secretaries was the firm's branch in Panama with Ricardo Cambra La Duke as its agent. Both Milltown Corporate Services and Ireland and Overseas Acquisitions, which had Erik Vanagels (Latvian: Ēriks Vanagelis) and Stan Gorin (Latvian: Staņislavs Gorins) as directors (both in reality were pensioners from Latvia) and Burwell as administrator, were shell companies of International Overseas Services. Milltown Corporate Services had been registered in Ireland until 2005, then briefly in British Virgin Islands, then in Belize, then

== Russian mafia connections ==
Parex and its successor ABLV Bank were connected to the St Petersburg based Tambovskaya Russian mafia which is close to Vladimir Putin during his political rise.

== $100 million loan ==
In 2005, Severneft CEO Zhan Khudainatov received a $100 million loan from Parex which led to the collapse of the Parex Bank and, later, was revealed in the Panama Papers. (Note: Nezavisimaya Neftyanaya Kompaniya (Russian: Независимая Нефтяная Компания) (Independent Oil Company) which is headed by Eduard Khudainatov (born 11 September 1960), a brother of Zhan Khudainatov, is under United States financial sanctions because of its closeness to the North Korean regime. As a former vice president of Rosneft, Eduard Khudainatov is close to Igor Sechin.) At the time of the loan, Denis Sherstyukov, a close business associate of both Kargin's son and Georgy Krasovitsky, a son of Viktor Krasovitsky, was on the council of Parex and has close ties to Vladimir Putin through Nils Ušakovs and his Harmony Centre which is close to Putin's United Russia. (Note: Georgy Krasovitsky is on the council of the VIA SMS Group with a 19% stake. Financial Investment, a Latvian company, owns 50 percent of VIA SMS Group, and Denis Sherstyukov had 31 percent. The CEO of FinnQ, a subsidiary of VIA SMS Group which in 2018 was entering the Lithuanian market along with another VIA SMS Group subsidiary Vialet, is Denis Sherstyukov.) From 2004 to 2008, Denis Sherstyukov expanded Parex into countries of the former Soviet Union.

== Alfa Bank offer ==
In 2007, the Latvian-Russian Petr Aven of Alfa Bank offered to buy Parex Banka from Kargins and Krasovitsky. However, Kargins and Krasovitsky wanted €1 billion which was not acceptable to Aven.

In October 2008, Baltic Screen estimated that Krasovitsky's wealth was 207 million lats (€291 million) and Kargin's wealth was 220 million lats (€309 million).

== 2008 financial crisis and PAREX takeover ==
=== Background ===
Prior to the 2008 financial crisis, JSC Parex Banka was the second largest bank in Latvia in 2008.

By the beginning of 2008, Britain had fully nationalized Northern Rock to save it from bankruptcy. In the second half of 2008, a number of large and pre-eminent banks and financial institutions went bankrupt, such as Lehman Brothers in the United States and Carnegie in Sweden.

In autumn of 2008, after the bankruptcy of several major banks and financial institutions, the 2008 financial crisis began in earnest. Several countries in the world had to seek international financial assistance, many countries provided support or even took over state-controlled banks and other credit institutions. In October 2008, the European Commission agreed on a plan to allow governments to engage in bank rescues with the rescue of JSC Parex Banka outlined on 25 November 2008.

Arnis Lagzdins was the compliance official at Parex Bank during the crisis at Parex and its sister firm Overseas Services and later held the same position at Ūkio bankas in Lithuania when very large sums were money laundered allegedly by Vladimir Putin, Yuri Chaika, and the Russian Mafia including the Tambovskaya Organized Crime Group.

=== Following events ===
On 30 July 2008, in a letter from Financial and Capital Market Commission of Latvia (FCMC) to the Chairman of the Board of Parex Bank titled, "On the results of the risk assessment of the bank," it was stated that an inspection had been carried out for the period from 12 November 2007 to 18 January 2008 and that the test results indicated that "the bank's performance [was] characterized by a moderate level of risk, and the methods used by the institution to manage risk [were] satisfactory, although improvements [were] needed in some areas."

From 18 August until 3 October 2008, the FCMC conducted an inspection with the aim of reviewing and evaluating Parex's lending process. The inspection revealed significant shortcomings in the lending process; as the economic situation in Latvia and the world changed and the solvency of borrowers worsened, Parex had not set up the amount of provisions corresponding to the quality of the loan portfolio (40 million lats shortfall), as well as weaknesses in credit risk management.

On 14 October 2008, the FCMC authorized Parex to include audited profit for the first half of 2008 in Tier 1 capital and to include Parex Group's audited profit for the first half of 2008 in Tier 1 capital of Parex Consolidation Group. This decision showed that Parex's capital adequacy position was relatively stable in mid-October 2008.

On 20 October 2008, as a result of the inspection, more accurate information was obtained about the current or current financial situation of Parex. The FCMC informed Parex of the deficiencies found during the inspection and invited Parex representatives to negotiate the improvements of deficiencies. After the initial refusal, a meeting between FCMC and Parex representatives took place only a week later.

==== Request for state support ====
On 22 October 2008, Parex owners privately requested state support to maintain the bank's solvency by proposing a state treasury deposit to Parex Bank. The Ministry of Finance rejected this suggestion. The outflow of money from Parex continued. Finance Minister Atis Slakteris discussed the situation with the FCMC and the Bank of Latvia, and on 28 October the Minister of Finance informed Prime Minister Ivars Godmanis. The authorities involved at the beginning of November concluded that Parex needs to be taken over by the state. Several options were considered – the full takeover of Parex banka into state ownership, the transfer of 51% of Parex banka's shares to the Mortgage and Land Bank, as well as the refusal of assistance. In the latter case, the state would have to pay the bank's customers at least LVL 660 million as a state guarantee for deposits. The Cabinet of Ministers supported the takeover of the bank into state ownership. It was considered that there would be no security for the use of public funds if the bank remained in the hands of its shareholders.

On 27 October 2008, withdrawals from Parex began to accelerate rapidly. Due to the risk of default of capital adequacy ratios and taking into account the promise of Parex's major shareholders to increase the capital base in case of necessity, FCMC requested Parex to submit by 29 October 2008 the Parex Capital Adequacy Recovery Plan. On this day along, around 29 million lats of capital left Parex.

==== Government takeover ====
In early November 2008, it was already clear that Parex's problems were so serious that it would involve the Cabinet of Ministers, and that Parex's takeover could be one of the most effective options for stabilizing the Latvian financial system by providing support to Parex.

On 8 November 2008, the Cabinet of Ministers decided to acquire a controlling interest in Parex Bank. The country, represented by the Privatization Agency of Latvia, became the largest shareholder of Parex Bank. The European Bank for Reconstruction and Development (EBRD) also acquired a share in Parex Bank over time.

== Split into Reverta and Citadele ==
As a result of the restructuring carried out on 1 August 2010, Parex was split into two separate institutions; Reverta was founded as a "solution bank" with the aim of recovering the public funds invested in its rescue. At the same time, Parex's "good" assets along with its credit institution services such as account and deposit servicing, credit lending were taken on by Citadele.

In December 2010, Reverta paid LVL 9.7 million in interest payments on the use of the state deposit.

Reverta had recovered 58 million lats by the end of the reporting period within five months of 1 August 2010.

On 28 December 2011, a Reverta shareholders' meeting made a decision on voluntary withdrawal from the credit institution's license.

On 15 March 2012, the Financial and Capital Market Commission (FCMC) supports the request of Parex banka and revokes the license of the bank's credit institution. The change of the company's operating model was a natural and carefully considered step, considering that the services characteristic of credit institutions are not provided by Parex since 1 August 2010.

8 May 2012 marked a major milestone in Parex banka's operations: the bank is starting to work as a professional asset management company – Reverta Joint Stock Company. With an active portfolio of nearly one billion euros, Reverta is the largest asset manager in the Baltic region and ranked among the leading analogue companies in Eastern and Central Europe.

== Causes of Parex's demise ==
According to investigations carried out in the wake of the crisis, it has been suggested that causes included

- Global financial turmoil;
- Increased withdrawal of deposits from Parex rig and Parex customer due to lack of financial resources, especially for residents of neighboring countries of Latvia;
- Two contracts with syndicated lenders on 29 June 2007 for a EUR 500 million loan and on 21 February 2008 for a loan of EUR 275 million. Loans had to be repaid early in 2009, but Parex would not be able to do so due to the fall in the value of the securities portfolio;
- Due to the 2008 financial crisis, the quality of Parex's foreign securities portfolio had deteriorated; Parex did not have a parent bank that would give Parex creditors additional guarantees or other collateral.

== Economic effects ==
The nationalization of Parex Bank has been stated by some as a 'major cause' of the 2008 Latvian financial crisis. Claims were made of a 'chain reaction' that caused the crisis, which prompted the government to take a €4.5 billion in bailout loans from the International Monetary Fund, the European Union and the World Bank. This is contrary to the view that the nationalization was a response to, rather than a cause of the effects of the 2008 financial crisis on Latvia.

== Legal suit ==
Reverta sued the founders, Kargins and Krasovickis, for nearly €88 million from 14 highly irregular loans and deposits at Parex Banka which occurred between 1995 and 2008. In October 2016, Kargins and Krasovickis were ordered to pay €4,284,792 to Reverta.

== See also ==
- Baltic states housing bubble
- 2008 Latvian financial crisis
- Latvia#Economic contraction and recovery (2008–12) and Austerity#Latvia
- Banka Baltija
- List of banks in Latvia
