= Ilmārs Poikāns =

Latvian hacker and AI researcher (born 1978)

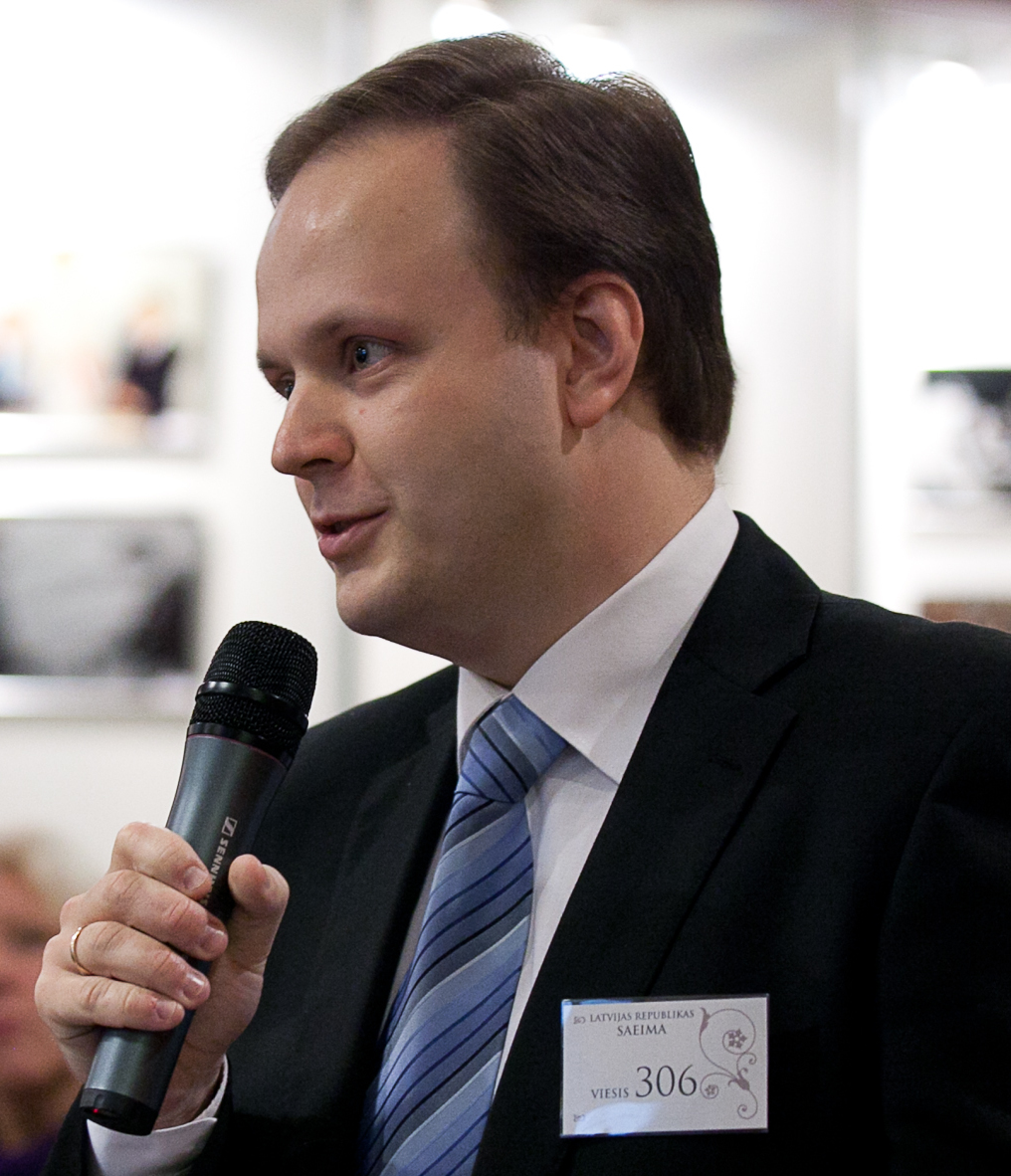
Ilmar Poikans, “hacker Neo”, at a public hearing of the Latvian Saeima in 2011.

Ilmārs Poikāns (born November 4, 1978) is a Latvian AI researcher at the Institute of Mathematics and Computer Science at the University of Latvia. He has used the pseudonym Neo (of The Matrix), and is also known in the press as Latvia's "Robin Hood".

Poikans alleged that both Valdis Dombrovskis, who is a European Commission Vice President responsible for the integrity of the euro, and the Bank of Latvia Governor Ilmars Rimsevics, who is a member of the council of European Central Bank, supported the fraud conducted at Parex Bank and that Rimsevics received a very large sum for his efforts.

== Allegations of illegal access to tax records ==
Ilmārs Poikāns was arrested and later released; prosecutors released a statement saying "Taking into consideration his attitude, his confession of the crime, and his cooperation in the investigation, we did not seek his pre-trial detention." Some allege that the arrest came as a result of a search of TV journalist Ilze Nagla's house on Tuesday May 11, 2010.

After his arrest there were reports of a flash mob outside the government's cabinet office.

Ilmārs is alleged to have illegally accessed 7.5 million tax records and divulged pay rises for some high-ranking public sector employees, while rank-and-file employees were forced to take pay cuts as high as 30%.

Poikāns was granted a presidential pardon on December 18, 2017.
