= Ivorian Industrial Development Bank =

Bank of Ivory Coast

- Company type: State owned company
- Industry: Financial services
- Founded: 1965
- Founder: Ivorian government, Chase Manhattan Bank, Lazard Freres
- Defunct: 1989
- Fate: Liquidation due to large number of non-performing loans
- Headquarters: Ivory Coast
- Products: Economic development loans
- Owner: Ivorian government

Ivorian Industrial Development Bank (French: Banque Ivoirienne de Developpement Industriel) (BIDI) was an Ivory Coast development finance institution that operated between 1965 and 1989. It advanced long term and medium term loans to medium and large scale enterprises in Ivory Coast. It was a leader in the field until it was liquidation in July 1989 due to a large percentage of non-performing loans.

== History ==
The bank began operations in 1965 as a joint venture between the Ivorian government, Chase Manhattan Bank, Lazard Freres and other foreign financial institutions. Key objectives were to stimulate capital investment in the country and increase private investment in the industrial sector. Early in its operations, it obtained financing from USAID, the Canadian International Development Agency and the German, KfW Bankengruppe. Between 1965 and 1976, it made loans totaling over $100 million to about 224 medium and large scale enterprises.

However, by early 1988, it had a large percentage of non performing loans on its books and it was liquidated in 1989.
