= ABLV =

ABLV may refer to:

- ABLV Bank
- ABV (TV station), callsign ABLV
- Australian bat lyssavirus
