= Baltic states housing bubble =

Economic bubble involving major cities of Baltic states in 2000s

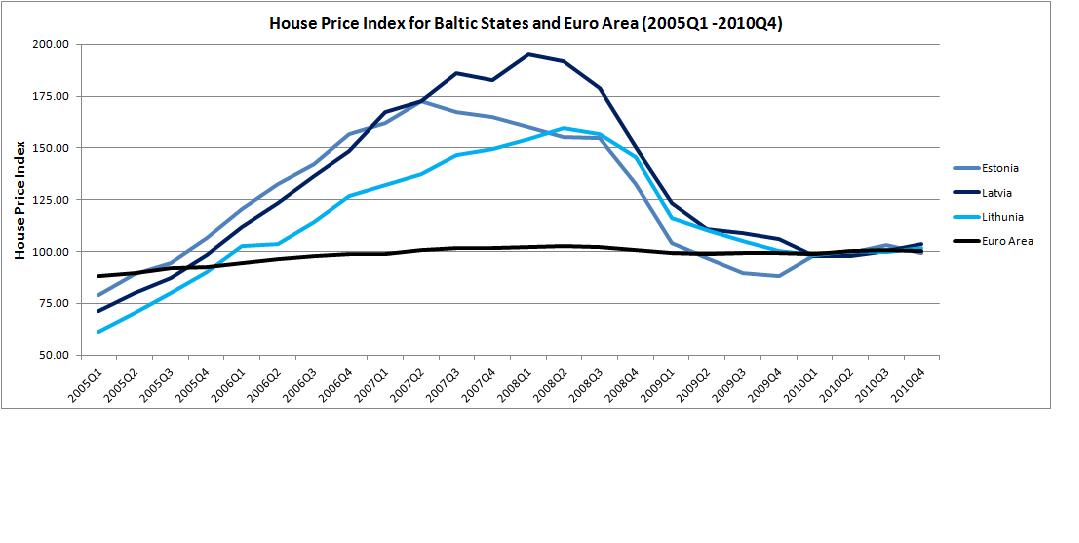
Illustration of House Price Index in the Baltic states compared to Euro Area during the housing bubble crisis in the Baltic states

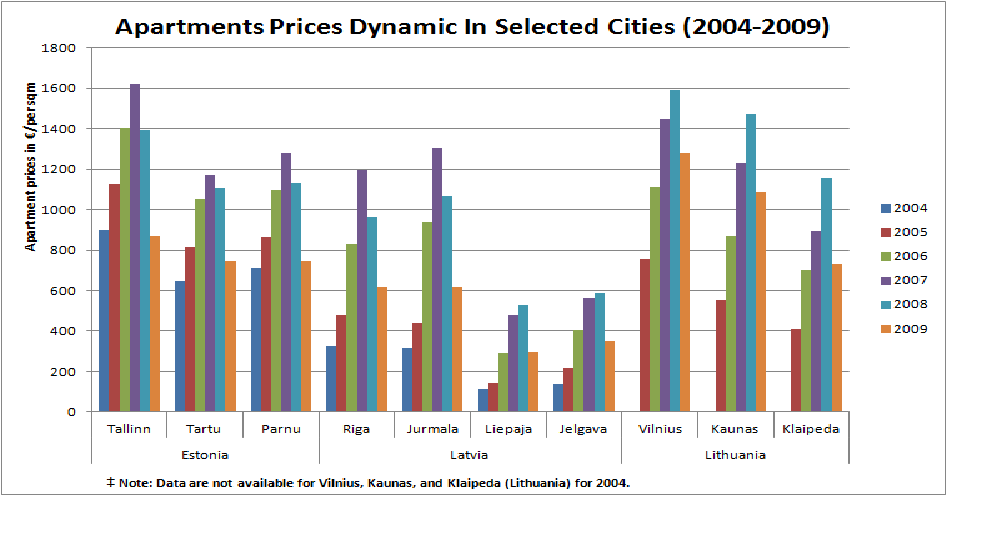
Illustration of apartments' price in the Baltic states during the housing bubble crisis

The Baltic states' housing bubble was an economic bubble involving major cities in Estonia, Latvia and Lithuania. The three Baltic countries had enjoyed a relatively strong economic growth between 2000 and 2006, and the real estate sectors had performed well since 2000. In fact, in between 2005Q1 and 2007Q1, the official house price index for Estonia, Latvia and Lithuania recorded a sharp jump of 104.6%, 134.3% and 106.7%. By comparison, the official house price index for Euro Area increased by 11.8% for a similar time period.

The housing price correction had begun in Estonia by mid-2007 followed by Latvia and Lithuania in mid-2008. Subsequently, Latvia and Estonia experienced recession by first half of 2008, while Lithuania had experienced a slowdown in its economy by the first half of 2008. The situation worsened after the 2008 financial crisis, sending the entire region into a full-blown recession. All three countries experienced recession by 2009.

The increase of credit supply to private sectors was largely to be blamed for the housing bubble in the Baltic states, due to the availability of financing from foreign lenders (predominantly Scandinavian banks). Domestic banks (notably Parex Bank, a national bank in Latvia) were largely reliant on rolling their foreign loans (denominated in Euro) with large exposure to the real estate sector. The condition was further worsened due to the absence of loan-to-value ratio as well as negative real interest rate which spurred speculators to drive the market housing demand higher. The credit supply was then deteriorated at the peak of the boom as both foreign and domestic banks tightened lending standards due to the higher credit risk in the region. Subsequently, real estate market were dragged down, further deteriorate credit quality, forced banks to further tighten lending standards.

The severity of the crisis differed from one to another; with Latvia was the hardest hit by the crisis. Latvia applied for balance of payments support from International Monetary Fund, the European Union and regional members in November 2008 in order to strengthen the fiscal situation following the bail out of Parex Bank (largest bank in Latvia). Lithuania experienced lesser impact from the crisis compared to Latvia, as it adopted significant austerity measures and more stimulus measurements compared to the both Baltic states. Nevertheless, public sector wage faced cuts as well as lesser social benefits. Estonia, on the other hand, saw the public sector wages and benefits slashed in order to improve the budget balance in preparation for the adoption of euro.

== Background ==
The economy in the Baltic states had been among the fastest growing in the European Area following the collapse of the Soviet Union as well as the recession due to 1998 Russian financial crisis. To minimize its dependence on Russia, the Baltic states opted to integrate closer to the Western Europe. By early 2000, the Baltic states' economy had begun to grow, to some extent higher than some of its Euro Area counterparts. Following the EU accession of Estonia, Latvia, and Lithuania in 2004, the period in between 2005 and 2007 witnessed an overheated economy of the three Baltic states. A combination of growth above potential, high inflation and far widening of the current account deficit were singled out as causes behind the overheating economy in the Baltic states. A credit boom in addition to bullish real estate investment spurred by foreign banks (predominantly Scandinavian Banks) worsened the scenario. All these factors led to a housing bubble in the Baltic states, piloting the real estate sector beyond sustainable.

Table 1: Key economic indicators for 2005–2007

Estonia

Main economic indicators	2005	2006	2007
GDP (real)	10.5	11.2	7.1
CPI average	4.1	4.4	6.6
Current account deficit (% of GDP)	-10.3	-15.5	-17.4
Foreign direct investment, net inflow (% of GDP)	22.5	13.2	15.6
Unemployment rate (%)	7.9	5.9	4.7
Gross wage (in €)	555	596	784
Real estate/construction/finance (% of GDP)	10.6/8.6/3.6	10.4/9.9/4.0	10.3/10.7/4.0

Latvia

Main economic indicators	2005	2006	2007
GDP (real)	10.6	11.9	10.2
CPI average	6.7	6.6	10.1
Current account deficit (% of GDP)	-12.5	-22.3	-22.8
Foreign direct investment, net inflow (% of GDP)	5.1	8.5	9.4
Unemployment rate (%)	8.7	6.8	5.4
Gross wage (in €)	350	430	683
Real estate/construction/finance (% of GDP)	7.7/7.0/4.3	7.9/8.5/5.6	8.2/10.4/5.4

Lithuania

Main economic indicators	2005	2006	2007
GDP (real)	7.9	7.7	8.8
CPI average	2.7	3.8	5.7
Current account deficit (% of GDP)	-7.2	-10.8	-13.7
Foreign direct investment, net inflow (% of GDP)	4.6	6.8	5.9
Unemployment rate (%)	8.3	5.6	4.3
Gross wage (in €)	421	459	594
Real estate/construction/finance (% of GDP)	6.4/7.8/2.2	6.5/9.4/2.7	6.5/11.2/3.3

(Sources: Eurostat, World Bank)

Indicators of overheating economy in Baltic states:

- Unsustainable economic growth: All three Baltic states experienced very high market growth compared to the rest of Euro Area. The real GDP for Latvia achieved double digits for three consecutive years from 2005 and Estonia for two consecutive years from 2005. Even the real GDP for Lithuania from 2005 to 2007 is considered higher than the average growth in the Euro Area. Such high economic growth largely due to their measurement to attract foreign capital to their shore. In Estonia, the amount of foreign direct investment (FDI) inflow hit as high as 22.5% of GDP and maintained the inflow in double digits up to 2007. Both Latvia and Lithuania managed to attract substantially high FDI to their shores though a much lesser share compared to Estonia. In all three Baltic states the majority FDI directly benefited the real estate and construction sectors. Unlike their preceding years, manufacturing sectors received far less than the real estate and construction sectors. Economists at the UniCredit Group opined the growth rate as consumption-led economic growth, with trade, finance, commercial services, real estate and construction fuelling the growth. Simultaneously, external imbalances became more worrying as the imports were growing twice as fast as the exports.
- Inflow of "hot money" abroad: The lion's share of investment flows came in the form of foreign credit, to a smaller extent in the form of foreign direct investments and portfolio investments. The degree of foreign ownership in Baltic banking is quite high, thus majority credit growth was largely financed by heavy borrowing of the biggest players in the lending market from the parent banks. Consequently, there is a sizeable inflow of debt (denominated in foreign currency) into the banking sector from parent banks to support the credit growth in the Baltic states. Throughout 2004–2007, total loans outstanding grew by 30-60% annually in the Baltic states with majority of loans granted to mortgage loans.
- Labour market tightening: Following the EU accession, many low-skilled workers, especially Latvian and Lithuanian, left their homes to emigrate to the United Kingdom and Republic of Ireland for better wages. The biggest impact was on the unemployment rate in the Baltic states. Estonia saw its unemployment rate fall from as high as 11.9% in 2001 to 4.7% in 2007. The unemployment rate in Latvia was down from 12.1% in 2001 to 5.4% in 2007, while Lithuania's was from 17.4% in 2001 to 4.3% (Institute, 2009). As a result, the labour market became tight – which forced the nominal wages to rise in an accelerative manner for two successful years in Estonia, Latvia and Lithuania. Such a rise in the nominal wages actually fanned the inflation besides eroding the competitiveness of the affected Baltic states – due to a widening current account balance.
- Fiscal policy: In Estonia, the biggest issue lay on the current account deficit which was contributed by the rapid credit growth, which in return stimulated demands for imports The deficit was largely financed by a combination of FDI inflows, excessive borrowing by domestic bank from foreign parent banks, and an increase access to EU funds. On the positive side, Estonia was running on a surplus to enable the government to repay debts. In order for Estonia accession to the EU, Estonia had largely maintained a surplus till before the crisis, to fulfil the Maastricht Criteria of a budget deficit below 3% of the GDP. Thus, Estonia maintained the position as having the most stable public finances during the crisis. The situation in Latvia was far more worrying than its two neighbouring countries. By 2005, the International Monetary Fund (IMF) issued a caution to Latvia in order to minimize the economic risk from overheating. Latvia only responded by 2007 by clamping down on the credit market when inflation had skyrocketed to double digits. The scenario was further worsened due to its budgetary policy always having a deficit due to the incorrect assumption that the economy would always perform stronger than expected. In Lithuania, certain government policies caused much controversy in clamping down on the overheated economy. For instance, income tax incentives for individuals taking housing loans and an absence of a property tax appeared to lend support to credit and housing price growth. "Red tape" among the highly bureaucratic central and municipal governments distorted the market supply and demand equilibrium for housing. During the economic overheating, the ruling democratic coalition reduced tax and increased government spending on social programmes. The wages for the public sector also stoked up the inflation rate, besides worsening the current account deficit.
- Overheating property market: In Estonia, a property price bubble was largely concentrated in Tallinn, Tartu City and Pärnu City. The average price of apartments purchased in Estonia excluding Tallinn in 2004 was estimated at EEK10,045 (€642) per square metre but increased to EEK18,134(€1,159) per square metre in 2007. In Tallinn, from an average of EEK14,035(€897) per square metre in 2004, the average price reached EEK25,447(€1,620) per square metre in 2007. Elsewhere in Tartu City, the average price per square metre touched as high as EEK18,290 (€1,169) in 2007 compared to EEK10,123 (€647) per square metre in 2004. Meanwhile, in Pärnu City, the average price of apartments purchased in 2007 was estimated at EEK20,027 (€1,280) per square metre compared to EEK11,093 (€709) per square metre in 2004. In Latvia, a property price bubble could be detected in Riga, Jūrmala, Liepāja and Jelgava. The average price for urban localities on average per metre square was LVL158 (€224) in 2004 but went up to LVL665 (€946) in 2007. Riga experienced the highest incremental in term of apartment price per metre square – from LVL229 (€325) (in 2004) to LVL841 (€1,196) (in 2007), a jump of 267%. Jurmala of Pierīga region recorded a huge jump, in terms of price per square metre; from LVL 222 (€315) (in 2004) to LVL916 (€1,303) (in 2007). Other cities also recorded a similar pattern: Liepāja (Kurzeme) from LVL79 (€112) per metre square in 2004 to LVL 338 (€480) per metre square in 2007, Jelgava (Zemgale) from LVL96 (€136) per square metre in 2004 to LVL 396 (€563). In Lithuania, the property bubble could be seen in Vilnius, Kaunas and Klaipėda. In Vilnius, the average price per square metre in 2005 reached LTL2,618 (€758) but hit as high as LTL 5,500 (€1,592) in 2008. In Kaunas, the average price per metre in 2008 reached LTL5,083 (€1,472) compared to LTL1,916 (€554) in 2005. In Klaipeda, the average per metre in 2005 was about LTL1,416 (€410) but went up to LTL4,000(€1,158).

== Timeline ==
=== 2000–04 ===
Since regaining independence from the Soviet Union in 1991, the economy growth in Estonia, Latvia and Lithuania has been among the fastest in EU-25 region. The average GDP growth in Estonia, Latvia and Lithuania from 2000 to 2004 was 7.56%, 7.42%, and 7.00%, respectively. Unemployment rate in Estonia has gone down from as high as 13.9% in 2000 to 8.5% in 2004. Elsewhere Latvia and Lithuania also saw the unemployment rate declined from 13.3% and 16.1%, respectively in 2001 to 10.3% and 11.4%. Strong integration with the EU bloc partly helps in accelerating the economic growth in the Baltic States, as the Baltic States were rebuilding the nation economy from the post-independence from the Soviet Union as well as 1998 Russian financial crisis. By 18 December 2002, EU summit in Copenhagen formally invite Estonia, Latvia and Lithuania to join the bloc. Referendum carried out in 2003 showed that majority Lithuanian, Estonian and Latvian supported the move to integrate closer to the EU bloc. Subsequently, on 1 May 2004, Estonia, Latvia and Lithuania joined other new states into EU. Strong integration with the EU benefits the Baltic States economy as foreign direct investment inflow helps to accelerate the economy especially the financial intermediaries and manufacturing sectors. Following a sharp inflow of cheap foreign credit, banks has been more willing to lend to corporate and household for real estate related activities. In fact, total loans approved for the purpose of housing purchase have been increasing in the Baltic States over the period in between 2000 and 2004. By 2004, the ratio of housing loans to total loans approved in Estonia, Latvia and Lithuania were 79.8%, 76.3% and 62.9%, respectively. Consequently, housing prices in the Baltic States began to boom in this period. The gross wage in Baltic States generally has improved since 2000, reflecting improvements in the Baltic States economy. Gross wage in Estonia has gone up 32% in 2004 compared to 2001, Latvia up by 11% and Lithuania up by 22%. However, many Latvians and Lithuanians have opted to work in the Western Europe (especially United Kingdom and Ireland) due to higher wages. By 2004, inflation rate in Latvia was exceptionally higher than Estonia and Lithuania due to strong domestic demand – which triggered the symptom of overheated economy.

=== 2005 ===
By 2005, the economy in the Baltic States became overheated. GDP (y-o-y % change) in Estonia, Latvia and Lithuania were 10.2%, 10.6% and 7.9% respectively. Unemployment rate continued to fall in 2005 as the unemployment rate in Estonia, Latvia and Lithuania declined to 7.9%, 8.7% and 8.3%. Consequently, the fall of unemployment rate has resulted in the gross wage in the Baltic States to increase substantially. In Estonia, the gross wage has gone up by 19.1% compared to 2004, while Latvia and Lithuania recorded an increase of 11.4% and 25.6% compared to 2004. Inflation rate also gone up substantially in the Baltic States as the Estonia, Latvia and Lithuania recorded 4.1%, 7.0% and 3.0% respectively. Foreign direct investment into the Baltic States increased sharply by 2005. In Estonia, 80.5% of FDI went into financial intermediaries. FDI into Latvia largely targeted on financial intermediaries (24.1%), manufacturing (11.8%), real estate (6.8%) and construction (4.2%). Manufacturing remained the most important sector in attracting FDI into Lithuania accounting 87.2%. The sign of property bubble in Baltic States were prevalent by 2005. Based on the House Price Index published by Eurostat, Estonia recorded a huge increase in the housing price as it has gone up by 34.6% in the fourth quarter of 2005 compared to the first quarter of 2005. Tallinn, the capital city of Estonia on average recorded an increase of close to 25.5% in 2005 compared to 2004. Tartu and Pärnu also reportedly saw the average housing price up by 25.6% and 21.8%, respectively compared to 2004. At the same time, Latvia also watched the House Price Index edged up 26.8% in the fourth quarter of 2005 based on the first quarter of 2005. By 2005, housing price in Riga remained as the most expansive housing in Latvia as the housing price on average up by 47.1% in 2005 compared to 2004. Housing price in Jūrmala also saw the housing prices gone up by 39.0% in 2005 compared to 2004. Liepāja and Jelgava, on the other hand, observed housing price appreciation by 26.7% and 59.6% compared to 2004. Housing price in Lithuania also observed substantial gain in 2005 as the housing price index rose by 46.9% in 2005. Housing price in major cities of Lithuania was more expansive than Riga (Latvia) in 2005. For instance, an apartment in the suburb of Vilnius on average fetched up LTL2,617 (€758) per metre square, while an apartment in Kaunas and Klaipėda on average were estimated at LTL1,912 (€554) per metre square and LTL1,415 (€410) per metre square. In comparison, an apartment in the suburb of Riga on average was about LVL 335 (€478) per metre square in 2005. High availability of credit combined with low interest rate partly attracted substantial volume of property speculation within the Baltic States. In Estonia, the interest rate on mortgage on average has fallen from 4.4% (2004) to 3.5% (2005). As cheap foreign credit (in the form of FDI) flooded the financial sector in Estonia, 87.0% of mortgage loans for household were denominated in Euro. The ratio of household mortgage loans to total household loans were the highest among the Baltic States, approaching as high as 82.2% in 2005. Latvia also saw a rapid expansion in bank lending to residents give rise to the issue of credits outpaced deposits in 2005. Owing to the low growth of domestic deposits, Latvia has been heavily dependent on FDI as the main source of funding since 2000. By 2005, major banks has to resort to external bank borrowing, backed up by foreign liabilities of banks (mostly through parents), to counter the FDI shortfall. Two-thirds of domestic credit expansion has to be funded by net foreign indebtedness of banks. Part of the causes of high loan growth was due to the interest rate in Latvia has gone down from an average of 8.28% (2004) to 5.95% (2005). This has justified the increase of total mortgage loans to household to almost double the amount of mortgage loans approved for household in 2004. In term of household mortgage loans, banks in Lithuania were more prudent than the neighbours. In fact, in 2005, Bank of Lithuania has urged domestic and foreign banks in Lithuania to apply conservative principles in establishing the value of properties especially in dealing unfavourable market developments. Similar to Latvia, majority funding for credits in Lithuania were heavily dependent on lending from foreign parent-bank to subsidiaries. In 2005, total mortgage loans denominated in Euro constituted up to 80.3%, while remaining 19.7% of house loans were denominated in Lithuanian litas. House loans constituted approximately 65% of loans approved for households. Interest rate for mortgage loans has declined from 4.27% (2004) to 3.61% (2005).

=== 2006 ===
Latvia became the fastest growing economy in EU-25 as the GDP (% y-o-y) registered 12.2% compared to Estonia (11.2%) and Lithuania (7.7%). Unemployment rate fall extended in 2006 as the unemployment rate in Estonia, Latvia and Lithuania declined to 5.9%, 6.8% and 5.6%. Lower unemployment rate greatly influenced the gross monthly wages in the Baltic States as the gross monthly wages were higher than 2005. The average gross monthly wages in Estonia gone up by 7.4% compared to 2005, partly due to lack of workforce, higher emigration rate, higher profitability of enterprises and higher productivity. Meanwhile, Latvia developed into the highest wage growth in the EU as the gross monthly wage spiked up by 22.8% compared to 2005. Lithuania gross monthly wage increased by 9.0% compared to 2005, due to higher number of working days, newly enacted rate of monthly minimum wage as well as minimum hourly fee effective on 1 July 2006. Inflation rate in the Estonia, Latvia and Lithuania recorded 4.4%, 6.8% and 3.8% respectively. The property bubble crisis in the Baltic States remained persistent throughout 2006. In Estonia, the House Price Index shot-up 47% (y-o-y % change) in 2006. The average price per square metre in Tallinn rose 24.4% compared to 2005, while Tartu and Pärnu observed the average housing price up by 29.2% and 26.9%, respectively compared to 2005. On the other hand, Latvia House Price Index edged up 50.9% (y-o-y % change) in 2006. By 2006, housing price in Riga has gone up sharply as high as 73.6% compared to 2005. Housing price in Jūrmala also saw the housing prices gone up by 114.8% in 2006 compared to 2005. Liepāja and Jelgava, on the other hand, observed housing price appreciation by 104.2% and 86.1%, respectively compared to 2005. Lithuania also closely followed the regional trend as the House Price Index up by 41.0% (y-o-y % change). Its capital city, Vilnius remained the most expansive housing in the country as the house price on average gained 46.4% compared to 2005. Kaunas and Klaipėda also experienced unusual housing price growth as the house price appreciated by 56.7% and 70.4%, respectively compared to 2005. Despite the interest rate on mortgage loans has gone up in all three Baltic States, it has failed to damper speculation on real estate activities. In Estonia, interest rate for household mortgage loans increased from an average of 3.5% (2005) to 4.2% (2006). Nevertheless, real estate loans continued to dominate in term of household loans, representing the 82.4% of the loans approved to households. Total approved real estate related loan denominated in euros rose 64.4% compared to 2005. Total real estate loans granted to household up 63.4% compared to 2005. Meanwhile, Latvia has raised the interest rate for mortgage loans significantly from an average of 5.95% (2005) to 6.80% (2006). Mortgage loans remained as the most significant component in Latvia household loans, as the mortgage loans constituted up to 81.6% of total loans approved for household. Total mortgage loans approved for household up 82.6% compared to 2005. Lithuania also raised the interest rate for household mortgage loans from an average of 3.61% (2005) to 4.16% (2006). Real estate loans continued to dominate in term of household loans, representing the 64.4% of the loans approved to households. Total real estate loans granted to household up 44.8% compared to 2005.

=== 2007 ===
The economy in Estonia began to decelerate due to slowdown in real estate related activities in the third quarter. The GDP (% y-o-y) of Estonia registered 7.1% in 2007 compared to a double digit growth in 2006. Latvia and Lithuania, in contrast chalked up robust economic growth as the GDP (% y-o-y) registered 10.3% and 8.0%, respectively in 2007. Unemployment rate continued to fall in 2006 as the unemployment rate in Estonia, Latvia and Lithuania declined to 4.7%, 5.4% and 4.3%. Gross monthly wage continued to increase into 2007 with Estonia up by 31.5% compared to 2006, Latvia 47.2%, and Lithuania 29.4%. Inflation rate accelerated in the Baltic States as the inflation rate in Estonia, Latvia and Lithuania touched as high as 9.6%, 14.1% and 8.1%. Consequently, this has given rise to economy overheating concern in the Baltic States. Housing price in Estonia encountered the first correction in housing prices by the third quarter of 2007. The official house price index for Estonia went down 2.8% (q-o-q % change) in the third quarter and 1.4% (q-o-q % change) in the fourth quarter. Nevertheless, the house price index in Estonia edged up 5.1% (y-o-y % change) in 2007. House price in Tallinn increased by 15.6% compared to 2006. Tartu and Pärnu, on the other hand, marked an increase of 11.0% and 16.6% compared to 2006. House price in Latvia also technically undergo correction in the fourth quarter as the official house price for Latvia down 1.8%. However, the house price index for Latvia gone up 23.1% (y-o-y % change) in 2007. By 2007, housing price in Riga recorded a jump of 44.1% compared to 2006. Housing price in Jūrmala also saw the housing prices gone up by 38.5% in 2007 compared to 2006. Liepāja and Jelgava, on the other hand, observed housing price appreciation by 65.5% and 39.3%, respectively compared to 2006. Lithuania, in contrast saw the house price index gained 17.7% (y-o-y % change) in 2007. Vilnius recorded an increase of 30.5% in housing price compared to 2007, while Kaunas and Klaipėda saw an increase of 41.7% and 27.4% compared to 2007. Interest rate for mortgage loans in Estonia hike from an average of 4.2% in 2006 to 5.5% in 2007. Total approved mortgage loan denominated in euros rose 30.0% compared to 2006. Mortgage loans continued to dominate in term of household loans, representing the 80.9% of the loans approved to households. Total real estate loans granted to household up 31.5% compared to 2006. In Latvia, average interest rate for mortgage loan has gone up sharply as the Latvian authorities move in to cool off the overheating property market. By 2007, the average interest rate for mortgage loan has gone up to 10.30% from an average of 6.81% in 2006. Total mortgage loans down by 4.0% in 2007 as banks in Latvia (notably Swedbank and SEB banka) tighten the lending requirements to household. Mortgage loans, however represents 86.0% of total loans approved for households. Elsewhere, in Lithuania total mortgage loans denominated in Euro has been more than double of the total loans denominated in euros in 2006. Real estate loans continued to dominate in term of household loans, representing the 63.9% of the loans approved to households. Total real estate loans granted to household up 115.6% compared to 2006. Interest rate for household mortgage loans increased from an average of 4.16% (2006) to 5.68% (2007).

=== 2008 ===
Estonia became the first Baltic state to be technically in recession in the second quarter of 2008. Latvia followed the suit later in the third quarter of 2008, while Lithuania by the fourth quarter of 2008. The GDP (% y-o-y) of Estonia recorded a -9.7% in 2008 (y-o-y % change) due to lack of domestic demand as well as external demand. Latvia suffered the worst as the GDP (y-o-y % change) crashed to -10.3% in 2008. Lithuania was the only Baltic State to record a GDP growth of 3.0% in 2008. Inflation rate remained persistently high in the Baltic States as Estonia, Latvia and Lithuania registered 10.4%, 15.4% and 10.9%, respectively. Unemployment rate in Estonia, Latvia and Lithuania chalked up 5.5%, 9.9% and 5.8%, accordingly. Housing price in Estonia continued to decline in 2008, but magnified by a sharp crash in the fourth quarter of 2008. The official house price index for Estonia went down 14.4% (q-o-q % change) in the fourth quarter, down a total of 19.6% (y-o-y % change) in 2008. House price in Tallinn depreciated by 14.1% compared to 2007. Tartu and Pärnu, on the other hand, declined of 5.1% and 11.7% compared to 2007. House price in Latvia technically rebounded in the first quarter as the index edged up by 7.0% (q-o-q % change). However the impact from the property crash in Estonia can be seen in the second quarter of 2008. By the second quarter, the house price index has gone down 1.8% (q-o-q % change). Overall, the house price index for Latvia declined by 17.8% (y-o-y % change) in 2008. By 2008, housing price in Riga nosedived 19.6% compared to 2007. Housing price in Jūrmala also saw the housing prices declined by 18.3% in 2008 compared to 2007. Liepāja and Jelgava, on the other hand, observed housing price appreciation by 9.8% and 4.2%, respectively compared to 2007. Lithuania house price index began to drop in the third quarter of 2008. Overall, the house price index fell 2.5% on y-o-y basis. The housing price index fell 1.7% (q-o-q % change) in the third quarter, but declined sharply by fourth quarter of 2008 – down by 15.5% (q-o-q % change). All three major cities in Lithuania managed to outperform major cities in the Baltic States as Vilnius, Kaunas and Klaipėda registered an increase in housing price by 9.9%, 19.7%, and 29.8%, accordingly. In Estonia, total approved real estate related loan denominated in euros rose 16.9% compared to 2007. Real estate loans continued to dominate in term of household loans, representing the 80.5% of the loans approved to households. Total real estate loans granted to household up 10.3% compared to 2007. Interest rate for household mortgage loans in Estonia increased from an average of 5.5% (2007) to 6.4% (2008). FDI into real estate and construction sector dropped significantly as the real estate sector outlook in Estonia was bleak. In Lithuania, total approved real estate related loan denominated in Euro rose 9.7% compared to 2007. Real estate loans continued to dominate in term of household loans, representing the 62.9% of the loans approved to households. Total real estate loans granted to household up 8.8% compared to 2007. Interest rate for mortgage loans has rose from an average of 5.68% (2007) to 6.41% (2008). In Latvia, credit granting was further restricted especially after the fall of the US Lehman Brothers on 15 September 2008 – led to severe shortage of credit due to limited access to foreign financial resources. Total approved mortgage loans fell 77.0%, highlighting significance of credit crisis in Latvia. Interest rate for mortgage loans continued to increase from an average of 10.30% (2007) to 10.50% (2008).

=== 2009 ===
The Baltic states entered recession by 2009 as the GDP in Estonia, Latvia and Lithuania registered -14.3%, -17.7% and -14.8%. Unemployment rate increased sharply in the Baltic States as 14.6%, 18.4% and 13.8%. Gross wages were also reportedly lower than the previous years due to weaken domestic economy. Inflation rate meanwhile fell sharply in all three Baltic States. Housing price in Estonia continued to decline in 2009, down 33.5% on y-o-y basis, losing 48.9% of its value since the peak. First quarter saw the house price index depreciated by 21.5% (q-o-q % change), which subsequently fell to a new low by the fourth quarter. House price in Tallinn depreciated by 37.4% compared to 2008. Tartu and Pärnu, on the other hand, marked a down of 32.9% and 34.0% compared to 2007. House price in Latvia has gone down 44.6% from its peak, and down by 29.3% (y-o-y % change) in 2009. By 2009, housing price in Riga dived 35.7% compared to 2008. Housing price in Jūrmala also saw the housing prices declined by 41.9% in 2009 compared to 2008. Liepāja and Jelgava, on the other hand, observed housing price tumbled by 44.0% and 40.3%, respectively compared to 2008. Lithuania house price index was down 31.1% on y-o-y basis, losing 37.2% of its value since the peak. First quarter saw the house price index of Lithuania down 20.0% (q-o-q % change). Vilnius, Kaunas and Klaipėda registered depreciation in housing price by 19.7%, 26.2%, and 37.0%, accordingly.

=== 2010 ===
Economy in the Baltic states made a slow recovery in 2010, as the economy clawed back from recession in 2008 and 2009. Housing price also recovered albeit at a slower rate or stagnant in major cities of the Baltic States. Official House Price Index for Estonia up by 12.8% y-o-y basis as Estonia real property price recovered from the property price crash by the first quarter of 2010. On the other hand, Official House Price Index for Lithuania up by 1.3% on y-o-y basis. Despite recording a down by 1.9% (q-o-q % change) in the first quarter, the house price index rebounded by the second quarter, thus marking the recovery of house price index in Lithuania. Latvia recovered from the property crash by the second quarter of 2010, though the index has recorded a decline of 2.4% (y-o-y % change) by the end of quarter.

== Identification ==
Two specific indexes can be used to define the extent of property bubble in the Baltic states, namely Housing Affordability Index and House Price to Rent Ratio. In both cases, it was evidently that the whole housing price bubble in the Baltic States has developed since 2004.

The housing affordability index specifically defined as the "ratio of nominal real estate prices to the nominal GDP per capita in current prices". As the housing nominal real estate price rose at a quicker pace than nominal GDP per capita of each state, the housing prices imbalance started to build up in 2004Q1. The affordability index also observed imbalances to build up in the years up to 2007, just before the housing prices burst in the Baltic States. It took up to almost 4 years before the house price-to-GDP per capita ratio to return to the reference point levels in Estonia and Latvia, to lesser extent in Lithuania.

The second indicator also show that the house price-to-rent ratio dynamics imbalance began in 2004, before broadly adjusted back to pre-housing prices bubble levels in 2011. House price growth clearly outpaced the growth rates of house rates and disposable income in Latvia throughout the housing price bubble crisis. The impact of the housing prices crash in Latvia far worse than Estonia and Latvia during the housing price crash – as the housing prices outstrips the growth of rent rate. In Lithuania, the house price-to-rent even fall below the reference point in between the third quarter of 2009 up to the first quarter of 2010. The adjustment trend fizzled out by 2011 as the housing price began to rebound in the Baltic states.

== Causes ==
=== Liberalization of financial services in the Baltic states ===
Following the liberalization of financial services in the Baltic states, banks from the Nordic region were competing for market shares in the Baltic states. Thus, this fuelled in capital inflows and credit expansion into the Baltic states. In Latvia, the foreign-owned banks captured more than 60% of financial sectors, while in Lithuania and Estonia exceeded more than 90%. Due to ample global liquidity, the parent banks from the Nordic region were able to offer very low interest rates to the Baltic populations. A significant consequence from the "cheap" credit from the parent banks led to historical low interest rate loan (especially mortgage loans) in the Baltic States. Coupled with overly-optimistic attitudes on the integration with the European Union, investors' risk appetite on property speculation were higher. Eventually, this led to housing bubble in the Baltic states.

=== Poor risk management in the financial services in the Baltic States ===
Another direct outcome from the "cheap" credit abroad guided the banks to engage in imprudent lending supported by its parent banks. As the interest rate has been free-falling in the Baltic states, the real interest rate on deposit has been dwindling. Throughout the housing bubble period in the Baltic states, the deposit to loans ratio continued to widened – far higher than the entire Euro Area. For that reason, banks in the Baltic states have to borrow abroad heavily denominated in Euros before passing the currency risk to potential customers. As such move was unsustainable; many banks in the Baltic states found themselves "trapped" with high debts denominated in euros. When the housing price in the Baltic states crashed, banks in the Baltic States were unable to re-pay their debts due to high non-performing loans and lacked liquidity to sufficiently cover their debts to the parent banks.

=== Foreign capital inflow through real estate and financial service ===
Following the integration with the European Union, the Baltic States enjoyed strong economic growth and subsequently among the fastest economic growth in Europe. Thus, the Baltic States emerged as the top destinations for foreign direct investment (FDI). Generally majority FDI into the Baltic States was directed towards the non-tradable goods sector, notably real estate and financial sector compared to manufacturing sector. In this case, some researcher has argued that such investment would lead to the consumption boom, but would not translate into productivity gains in the tradable sector. Subsequently, this caused the labour and capital resources reallocation from more competitive sectors routing to non-tradable sectors thus inflating internal demands.

=== Characteristics of loans for the purpose of mortgage loans ===
Housing-related loans growth accelerated far higher than majority of the Euro Area during the property bubble period. As the interest rates for majority mortgage loans were variable (rather than fixed), borrowers were exposed to the risk of interest rate fluctuations and potential sharp decline in terms of property price decline. Furthermore, with the exception of Lithuania, both Estonia and Latvia imposed none cap on Loan-to-value ratio and debt-to-income ratio. Borrowers in Estonia and Latvia were also practically free from the maturity limit on their mortgage loans due to the absence of such condition by the lenders.

=== Low taxation rate ===
Housing taxation was rather low in Estonia, Latvia and Lithuania compared to the EU average throughout the housing bubble period. In addition, transfer taxes were almost absent in Estonia and Lithuania; while the average tax of real estate in EU constituted 1.0% of its GDP, the average tax in the Baltic States is far lower than its EU counterparts. Taxation on real estate constituted 0.2–0.3% of GDP in Estonia, while Lithuania (0.4–0.7% of its GDP) and Latvia (0.3%) throughout the housing bubble period. Given that the taxation on real estate in the Baltic States is far lower than the majority EU Area, this has created a strong incentive on speculation of real estate in the Baltic States.

== Measurements ==
=== Estonia ===
The 2009 budget has incorporated several tough measurements to control the deficit in order to fulfil the GDP Maastricht ceiling as condition to adoption of Euro. Operational expenditure was brought down following an average cut of 8% across ministries as well as wage bill frozen at the 2008 level following the trimming of civil servants. Total operational expenditure cut were estimated at 6.2% of Estonia GDP in 2009. To increase the state revenue, majority approved income tax cuts were postponed though no new taxes were introduced at that point. However, indirect taxes and charges were increased, for instance, base for VAT were broadened as well as an increase of VAT from 18% to 20%. Total revenue was about 2.7% of Estonia GDP in 2009. Bank of Estonia has also imposed the requirements to maintain reserve requirements of 15%, having strong bank regulatory and supervisory frameworks that includes capital requirements of 10% (international norm 8%), as well as limited deposit guarantee scheme. In addition to that, deposit guaranty scheme (also known as deposit insurance) has been raised from €20,000 to €50,000 effective from 23 October 2008. This coverage would covers more than 90% of deposit in the banking sector of Estonia. To raise the Guarantee Fund, banks in Estonia were required to pay quarterly premiums to the fund at a flat rate of 0.125% of the amount of each bank's guaranteed deposits.

=== Latvia ===
As part of the fiscal measurements in Latvia, the Latvian government has introduced several measurements to reduce its deficit. The expenditure cuts centred the adjustments as the wage bill was trimmed by 4% of GDP (constituted roughly 30% wage cut for central government employees), pensions cut by 10% (later revoked by Constitutional Court) and investment by 3% of GDP. The measurements were estimated at 6.7% of Latvia GDP. On the revenue end, personal income tax was increased from 23% to 26%, tax-free personal income tax allowance was cut to €50/month (from €125/month), VAT was increased by 3% to 21% (2009) followed by another 1% to 22% (2011), while the reduced rates increased by 5% to 10%. Employee social contribution was raise from 9% to 11%. On top of that, excise duties on tobacco, alcohol, and energy were increased along with vehicle taxes. Subsequently, progressive real estate tax was introduced in 2009 that doubled effective from 2011 onwards. The revenue budget was about 2.8% of Latvia GDP. In strengthening the financial sector, new internal FCMC (The Financial and Capital Market Commission) guidelines has been introduced to specify prompt remedial action for troubled banks before regulatory thresholds are breached. New amendments on the Law on Credit Institutions means that FCMC may intervene troubled banks in Latvia. Under the Law on Bank Takeovers, government may take over the banks in Latvia when deemed necessary.

=== Lithuania ===
To address the deterioration in the fiscal deficit, allocations for current spending under the 2009 budget were trimmed due to deflation risk, replaced domestically funded-capital projects with EU funds or rather shelved, and wage cuts on the civil servants (8%-36%) especially those on the higher-end of the pyramid The expenditure budget was about 5.8% of Lithuania GDP. To boast the state revenue, various tax rates have been adjusted higher as well as the broadening of the VAT base to protect the revenue base. Under the 2009 budget proposal, Corporate Income Tax increased from 15% to 20%, higher taxation on dividends, VAT general rate up from 18% to 19% as well as the removal of lower rates under the VAT with some exception to selected items (such as heating and medicine), in addition to higher excises on fuel, tobacco and alcohol. Nevertheless, temporary measurements such as personal income tax rates were cut from 24% to 15% to gain support for such adjustments. Real estate tax was introduced in 2009. The revenue budget took up about 1.6% of Lithuania GDP. To ease liquidity pressures, Bank of Lithuania has reduced the reserve requirements from 6 percent to 4 percent since October 2008, implemented a number of improvements on internal guidelines for lender of last resort operations (known as LoLR) and collateral valuation procedures, besides overseeing bank-by-bank deposits and liquidity positions. Besides that the deposit insurance was raised to €100,000 as well as the strengthening of bank resolution tools on the basis of Financial Stability Law in Parliament. Under the new framework, government guarantees of a total of 3 billion Litas or equivalent to 3.4% of Lithuania GDP were issued for bank recapitalization and asset purchases.

== Aftermath ==
=== Social impact ===
The tough austerity measurement in dealing the crisis has a tough impact on the social terms in the Baltic states. In some cases, social situation in the Baltic States may be worse off the situation in Portugal or Greece during the Eurozone crisis. Based on the European Commission assessments of all three National Reform Programmes, the issue on poverty and social inclusion in the Baltic states have been worsen. Almost more than a third of the population in Latvia and Lithuania are in risk of poverty and social exclusion though the scenario is slightly better in Estonia. The number of children needing social assistance has more than doubled since 2006, as children in jobless households were increasing over the years. In fact, such risks in Latvia and Lithuania were the highest in the EU.

Unemployment rate was highlighted as one of the significant factor contributed to increasing poverty. As in 2013, despite the general economy in the three Baltic states has improved since the crisis, unemployment rate remained high in all three Baltic States compared to the pre-crisis. Long term unemployment rate in the Baltic states were higher than the EU average, coupled with high unemployment rate among youth although much lower than Greece or Portugal.

At the same time, Latvia and Lithuania lost almost 13-14% of their total population to other EU members although Estonia managed to more or less retain majority of its population from emigration.

=== Political impact ===
==== Latvia ====
As the economic crisis worsened, a major protest on 13 January 2009, in and around the centre of Riga led to at least 100 people being arrested and more than 30 injured. The riot has been reported to be the largest ever protest in Latvia since her independence from the Soviet Union. This stemmed from massive public sector cuts and a major tax hike after the bailout of the Parex Bank earlier in December. The outcome of the riot was a period of political instability in Latvia that lasted for more than a year leading up to the Latvian parliamentary election carried out later in 2010.

By February 2009, the political instability in Latvia had further worsened when a motion of no confidence was tabled against the Latvian Prime Minister Ivars Godmanis, though the motion was unsuccessful. By February 2009, 20, PM Ivars Godmanis (the Latvia's First Party/Latvian Way) resigned from his posts after losing the support from the People's Party and the Union of Greens and Farmers. The Latvian President Valdis Zatlers, afterward nominated Valdis Dombrovskis as the PM and formed a government.

Political stability in Latvia was briefly restored in October 2010, 2, though it lasted only a few months. The coalition government (consisted of the Unity, Union of Greens and Farmers and National Alliance) managed to capture 63 (+4) seats out of 100 seats contested. The former PM's party, For a Good Latvia (alliance of People's Party and the Latvia's First Party/Latvian Way) lost badly as it only won 8 (-25) seats out of 100 seats contested.

A new election was then carried out on 17 September 2011, after the parliamentary dissolution was carried out on 23 July 2011. The new coalition government (consisted of Reform Party, Unity and National Alliance) was formed after obtaining 56 seats (-7) seats out of 100 seats contested. Thus, Valdis Dombrovskis was reappointed as the PM of Latvia.

==== Lithuania ====
In 2008 Lithuanian parliamentary election incumbent government coalition led by Gediminas Kirkilas was ousted by Andrius Kubilius after the coalition government (consisting of Social Democratic Party of Lithuania, Labour Party, and New Union (Social Liberals)) garnered only 36 seats, compared to 80 seats by the new government coalition (consisting of Homeland Union, National Resurrection Party, Liberal and Centre Union, and Liberal Movement). Drastic reform soon carried out by the new government to revive the Lithuania economy amid some unpopular decision. Even before taking office in December, PM Andrius Kubilius had announced budget spending cuts and wage freezes designed to shore up public finances as the slowdown reduces revenue.

By 16 January 2009, Vilnius was shaken with violent protests as protesters marched and damaged the Parliament building – resulted in 86 arrests. Similar to the riot in Latvia, protesters led by Lithuanian Trade Union Confederation were unhappy with the government decision to reform the tax system in Lithuania as well as public wage cuts. Nevertheless, the austerity measurements by PM Andrius Kubilius has resulted his loss in the following 2012 Lithuanian parliamentary election as the Social Democrat led by Algirdas Butkevicius captured the most seats in the parliament.

==== Estonia ====
Unlike Latvia and Lithuania, there were only minor protests reported in Estonia. On 29 October 2009, healthcare workers consisting of 50 members from Estonian Nurses' Union and the Federation of Estonian Healthcare Professionals' Unions staged demonstration to protest the cut on healthcare by the government. The Estonian Trade Union Confederation also condemned the government's proposal to cut the budget on healthcare.

Meanwhile, support for the government of Prime Minister Andrus Ansip fell to 4.3 on a 1-to-10 scale on 29 December 2008 which was the lowest since March 2005, according to the survey by EMOR polling company, commissioned by the public broadcaster. On the other hand, unlike Latvia and Lithuania, incumbent government has successfully defended its position in both Estonian parliamentary election in 2007 and 2011.
