= Crime in Latvia =

- Homicide: 2.8 (2024)
- Assault: 28.6 (2023)
- Burglary: 124.5 (2024)
- Theft: 651.9 (2024)
- Fraud: 152.7 (2024)
- Corruption: 5.0 (2024)
- Bribery: 3.0 (2024)
- Money laundering: 15.1 (2024)
- Rape: 15.0 (2023)
- Sexual violence: 29.3 (2023)
- reported per 100,000 inhabitants

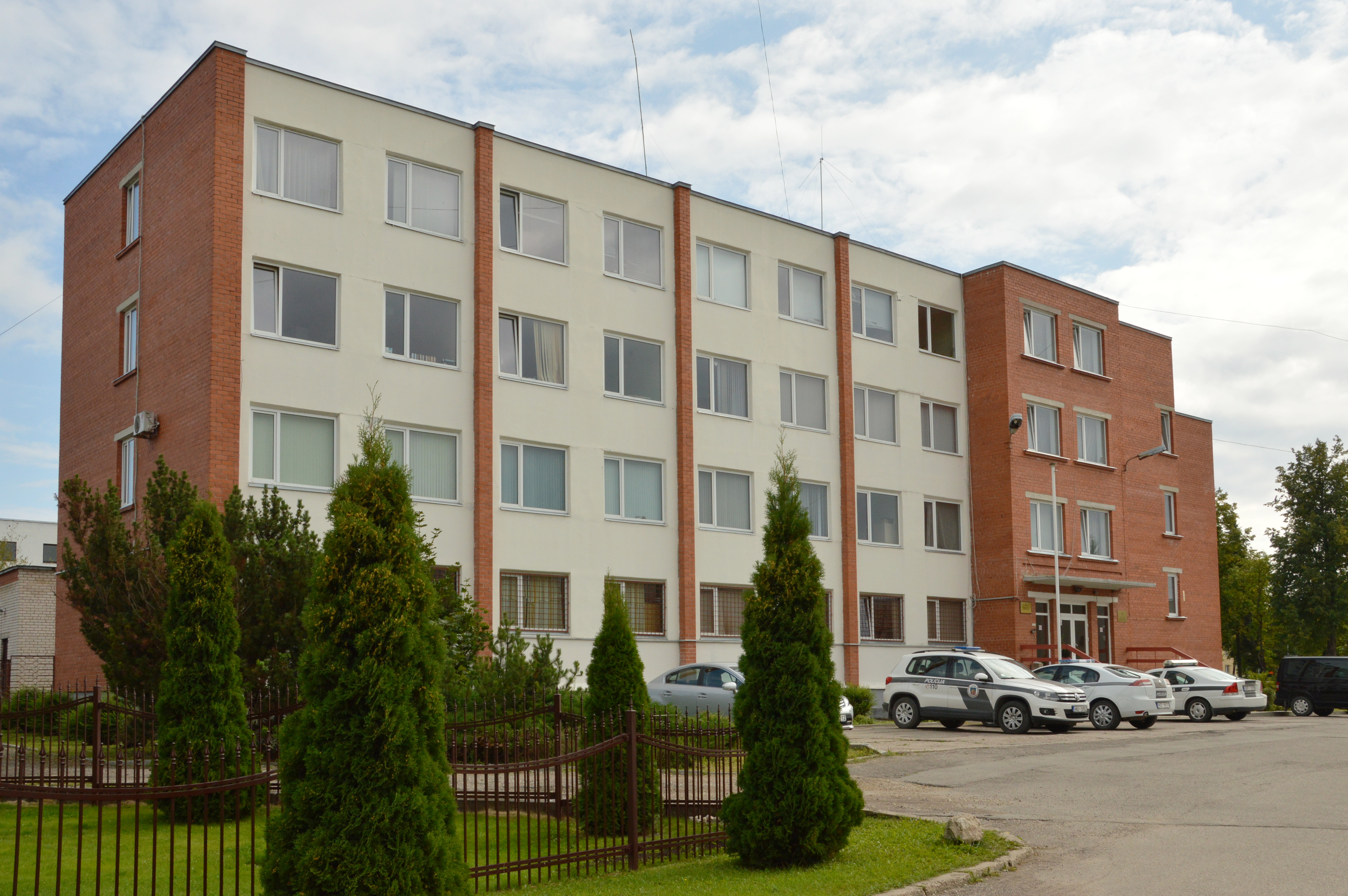
A Latvian State Police precinct in Gulbene

Crime in Latvia is relatively low by global standards, especially compared to 2008, when the country was named the "crime capital of Europe" by Forbes. The number of crimes committed per 100,000 people in Latvia was 154.7 as of 2018. The homicide rate in Latvia was 4.9 per 100,000 people in 2020, a sharp drop from 10 cases per 100,000 people in 2000, and it has been steadily decreasing. Although Latvia's homicide rate remains high by European Union standards, it is below the 2019 global average of 6.2 per 100,000. The United States Department of State has assessed Latvia's security rating as medium, indicating a moderate crime rate. In recent years, crime rates have seen fluctuations; for instance, the return of citizens stranded abroad during the COVID-19 pandemic correlated with a temporary rise in offenses. According to Interpol, Latvia's geographic positioning makes it a transit area for regional and organized crime groups involved in drug trafficking, arms trafficking, human trafficking, and smuggling. Data from the Central Statistical Bureau of Latvia indicates that a third of all women in Latvia have experienced some form of sexual violence or rape, while men are more frequently subjected to violence outside the family setting.

Crime rates increased significantly in Latvia following the restoration of independence from the Soviet Union. The transition from a planned economy to a free market economy caused widespread economic uncertainty, contributing to this rise. The Latvian government legally defines a crime as "an action endangering society and entailing criminal punishment, whether committed intentionally or through negligence". Historically, crimes against humanity were committed on Latvian soil by foreign powers, specifically the Soviet Union and Nazi Germany, during their respective occupations starting in 1940 and 1941.

== Human trafficking ==
Latvia serves as a source and destination country for individuals trafficked for commercial sexual exploitation and forced labor. Latvian women have been trafficked to countries such as Cyprus, Denmark, Germany, Greece, Italy, the Netherlands, Norway, Spain, and the United Kingdom for commercial sexual exploitation. Internal trafficking of Latvian women and teenage girls for the same purpose also occurs. One of the most prominent domestic cases involving sexual exploitation was the Logos Centrs pedophilia case, uncovered in 1999, which involved a catalog of 3,000 minors. Additionally, men and women from Latvia have been trafficked to the United Kingdom for forced labor. Documented cases also indicate Latvia has been a destination country for victims from Thailand, and there is a growing risk of trafficking targeting individuals from Ukraine, particularly following the escalation of the Russo-Ukrainian War. Between 2021 and 2023, 111 victims of human trafficking were identified by the Latvian government; while 16 originated from foreign nations, the vast majority were Latvian nationals.

According to the United States Department of State, the Government of Latvia does not fully comply with the minimum standards for the elimination of trafficking, but it has made significant efforts to do so. The government has expanded victim assistance programs by increasing access to state-funded protection and rehabilitation services. Law enforcement agencies have also increased efforts to investigate forced labor offenses. Latvia ratified the UN Trafficking Protocol in May 2004.

Prevention measures implemented by the Latvian government include initiatives targeting sex tourism. The Ministry of Family and Children's Affairs provides specialized training for professionals working with vulnerable populations to help identify trafficking risks. However, the Latvian government reported no active measures to reduce the demand for prostitution as of 2008.

Sections 154-1 and 154-2 of the Criminal Code of Latvia prohibit all forms of human trafficking, prescribing penalties ranging from three to 15 years of imprisonment. These penalties are comparable with those of other severe crimes, such as rape. The government also utilizes non-trafficking-related statutes to prosecute offenders. According to U.S. State Department data from 2008, the government was investigating two potential labor trafficking cases, though no formal convictions for forced labor had been made at that time.

The U.S. State Department's Office to Monitor and Combat Trafficking in Persons placed Latvia on the "Tier 2 Watchlist" in 2017. The country was upgraded to Tier 2 in 2023, a ranking it maintained into 2024. In 2023, the Organized Crime Index assigned Latvia a score of 5 out of 10 for human trafficking, noting that backlogs in the judicial system hampered anti-trafficking efforts. A 2022 GRETA report noted that while trafficking historical trends involved moving Latvian citizens abroad, since 2019 there has been a rise in foreign nationals being trafficked into Latvia, primarily for forced labor.

=== Protection ===
The Ministry of Welfare allocated $14,500 to train 271 social workers, improving the administration of victim assistance and rehabilitation services. While the government allocated $98,000 for victim assistance in 2007, actual spending was $23,000—an increase from the $10,000 spent in 2006. Foreign victims are offered legal alternatives to deportation; those who assist law enforcement can apply for temporary residency and work permits. In June 2007, the government established a 30-day "reflection period" allowing non-Latvian victims and their dependent children to access state-funded assistance while deciding whether to cooperate with law enforcement. State authorities and two NGOs are authorized to clear victims for state aid, while others receive support from independently funded NGOs. Training is also provided to law enforcement officers and specialists in orphan courts to aid victim identification. U.S. State Department reports note that the government does not penalize victims for unlawful acts committed as a direct result of being trafficked.

== Robbery ==
The robbery rate in Latvia stood at 27.7 cases per 100,000 people in 2018, down from 108.3 per 100,000 in 2004. Between 2018 and 2020, at least 10 commercial production and trading warehouses were targeted by robbers.

Notable recent cases include an armed robbery at a watch store in Riga Old Town on April 29, 2025, and infrastructural thefts in Kurzeme where €17,000 worth of bridge railings were stolen on May 29, 2025.

Robbery rate in Latvia per 100,000 people (2003-2015, 2017)
2009	2010	2011	2012	2013	2014	2015	2017
72.00	51.00	51.00	46.00	46.00	41.00	40.00	31.00

== Homicide ==
A 2020 study conducted by Eurostat revealed that the three Baltic states recorded the highest homicide rates in the European Union that year, with Latvia leading at 4.9 per 100,000 people, followed by Lithuania (3.5) and Estonia (2.8). Latvia also recorded the highest proportion of female homicide victims among EU nations at 60%, compared to the EU average of 37%. In 2023, Latvia recorded 79 intentional homicides; while lower than the peak annual averages of 100 recorded between 2016 and 2018, this figure remains higher than regional neighbors like Finland, Greece, and Slovakia.

In 2024, 67 individuals were killed; 42 cases were classified as homicides, while the remaining 25 were classified as intentional grievous bodily harm resulting in death. Data from the Public Broadcasting of Latvia indicates that the majority of both victims (72%) and perpetrators in these violent crimes are male.

== Drug trafficking and usage ==
According to Euronews, Latvia, along with Italy and the United Kingdom, ranks among the highest in Europe for serious drug usage; 9.1% of Latvian adults are reported to regularly use psychoactive substances such as opioids, cocaine, and amphetamines. The most common illicit substance used in Latvia is cannabis, primarily consumed by young adults aged 15–34, particularly males. However, overall drug consumption has seen an upward trend expanding into demographics in their 30s and 40s. Cocaine and ecstasy are also frequently used. Geographically, Latvia serves as a transit hub for the heroin trade, which is primarily driven by regional organized crime syndicates. Drug usage escalated sharply following the dissolution of the Soviet Union, reaching levels comparable to Western Europe by 2002.

During the 1970s and 1980s, illicit substances were predominantly manufactured in small-scale domestic environments. From the 1990s onward, organized criminal networks transitioned into large-scale illicit manufacturing of synthetic substances, including LSD, ecstasy, cocaine, and amphetamines.

== Corruption ==
Corruption remains a challenge within the country. The Group of States against Corruption noted in a 2019 report that Latvia needed more effective measures to achieve meaningful reductions in corruption. The specialized anti-corruption agency tasked with enforcement is the Corruption Prevention and Combating Bureau (KNAB). High-profile enforcement actions include the detention of former Bank of Latvia Governor Ilmārs Rimšēvičs on charges of accepting a €500,000 bribe from Trasta Komercbanka. External criminal entities, particularly from Russia, have also historically utilized regional financial institutions for money laundering schemes. To improve transparency, the Saeima enacted a comprehensive whistleblowing law on January 20, 2022, designed to protect individuals who report institutional misconduct and ensure safe reporting channels.

The structural influence of private interests in illegal political funding has historically hindered political anti-corruption initiatives. According to Transparency International's 2013 Global Corruption Barometer, 68% of surveyed households viewed political parties as highly corrupt, marking them as the least-trusted public institutions in the country. At the time, 55% felt corruption levels were unchanged, and 67% judged state anti-corruption campaigns to be ineffective. In Transparency International's 2025 Corruption Perceptions Index, Latvia scored 60 on a scale from 0 ("highly corrupt") to 100 ("very clean"). This score ranked Latvia 37th out of 182 countries assessed. For regional context within Western Europe and the European Union, (Note: Austria, Belgium, Bulgaria, Croatia, Cyprus, Czechia, Denmark, Estonia, Finland, France, Germany, Greece, Hungary, Iceland, Ireland, Italy, Latvia, Lithuania, Luxembourg, Malta, Netherlands, Norway, Poland, Portugal, Romania, Slovakia, Slovenia, Spain, Sweden, Switzerland, and the United Kingdom.) the highest score recorded was 89, the regional average was 64, and the lowest score was 40. Globally, the top score was 89, the international average was 42, and the lowest score recorded was 9.

The Corruption Prevention and Combating Bureau (KNAB; Latvian: Korupcijas novēršanas un apkarošanas birojs) was formally established in October 2002 following the legislative passage of the foundational KNAB law on April 18, 2002.

=== Police corruption ===
Police corruption in Latvia is more prevalent than it is in other EU states. According to Transparency International, Latvia has a Corruption Perception Index score of 4.9 out of ten, indicating a high level of perceived corruption. Particularly concerning is that the judiciary and police received high scores (out of five) for public perceptions of corruption, being 3.2 and 3.3, respectively. Political parties and the legislature received scores of 4 and 3.7.

Police and customs have been identified as corruption hotspots in Latvia, with a majority (58%) of Latvians regarding it as widespread. In particular, the road police have one of the lowest ratings for perceived honesty and integrity and are considered more corrupt than any other government institution. This stems from the common practice of demanding bribes, for example, at traffic stops. In these situations, a person has little option other than to pay the bribe (and thus avoid a fine or more severe penalty). The motivations for corruption are not entirely clear. Public officials point to low salaries, which may explain a significant proportion of bribery incidents. However, other public institutions, such as the postal service, have significantly lower salaries than police or customs, yet much lower rates of bribery and corruption. Since 2000, highway police have not been allowed to levy on-the-spot fines, which is likely to reduce the incidence of bribery in that context.

Latvia began developing an anti-corruption policy in 1995, culminating in the Corruption Preventing and Combating Bureau (KNAB – Korupcijas novēršanas un apkarošanas birojs) in 2002. KNAB is a multi-purpose anti-corruption body whose functions include investigating corruption offences, controlling activities of public officials and education and training on corruption risk. This is the most common example of a single-body approach to anti-corruption policy, with similar bodies existing in Hong Kong (on which KNAB is based) and Australia. KNAB operates as a pre-trial investigation body, with authority to refer matters to the public prosecutor. It has a broad jurisdiction, though most of its cases involve bribery offences. In 2001, a high-profile corruption case emerged when the then Deputy Chief of the Economic Police was arrested for receiving a bribe in an attempt to prevent the investigation of a smuggling and tax evasion case.

Latvia is a relatively new Member state of the European Union, having only joined in 2004. A recent survey found that people in new member state countries, especially Latvia, agree that bribery is the easiest way of obtaining certain public services than those in the original EU states. In 1998, a survey posed the following question to Latvian households: "A system whereby people could anonymously report instances of corruption would not be successful because corruption is a natural part of our lives and helps solve many problems". Only 37% of respondents disagreed with the statement. Additionally, Latvia has one of the lowest reporting rates for corruption in the EU, and most Latvians do not believe the government's anti-corruption efforts are likely to be successful.

== Organized crime ==
Organized crime networks are active in the country, leveraging Latvia's strategic location on the European continent. Illegal immigration, human trafficking, and public sector corruption are frequently exploited by these syndicates. While 70 distinct organized crime groups were reported operating within Latvia in 2014, enforcement operations reduced this figure to approximately twelve active groups by 2024. A significant portion of these criminal enterprises emerged from elements within the Russian-speaking minority, capitalising on the security and institutional transitions that followed the collapse of the Soviet Union. These networks often establish legitimate front organizations, such as sports associations (particularly boxing clubs), to anchor illicit protection rackets and obscure criminal proceeds. Throughout the late 1990s and 2000s, financial crimes, smuggling, and drug trafficking became deeply rooted. Evaluations by the U.S. Department of State and Jane's Intelligence Review frequently cited the regional banking sector as a significant hub for international money laundering operations.

== Illegal immigration ==
Illegal immigration remains a recurring border security challenge. The primary source countries for undocumented migration include Russia, Belarus, Ukraine, and Moldova, alongside migrants arriving from countries such as Iraq, Iran, Bangladesh, Vietnam, and Afghanistan. Latvia, alongside neighboring Lithuania and Poland, has stated that the administration in Belarus has systematically directed irregular migrants from conflict zones toward EU frontiers as an asymmetric political strategy. In response to these border pressures, Latvia instituted an official state of emergency along the Belarus–Latvia border.

There were 665 refugees in Latvia in 2019, 237,966 migrants, and 181 new asylum applications in 2019; in 2021, Latvia revealed it had detained 1,000 migrants, mostly from Iraq, Afghanistan and other Middle Eastern countries along the Belarus-Latvia border.

== Efforts to prevent crime ==
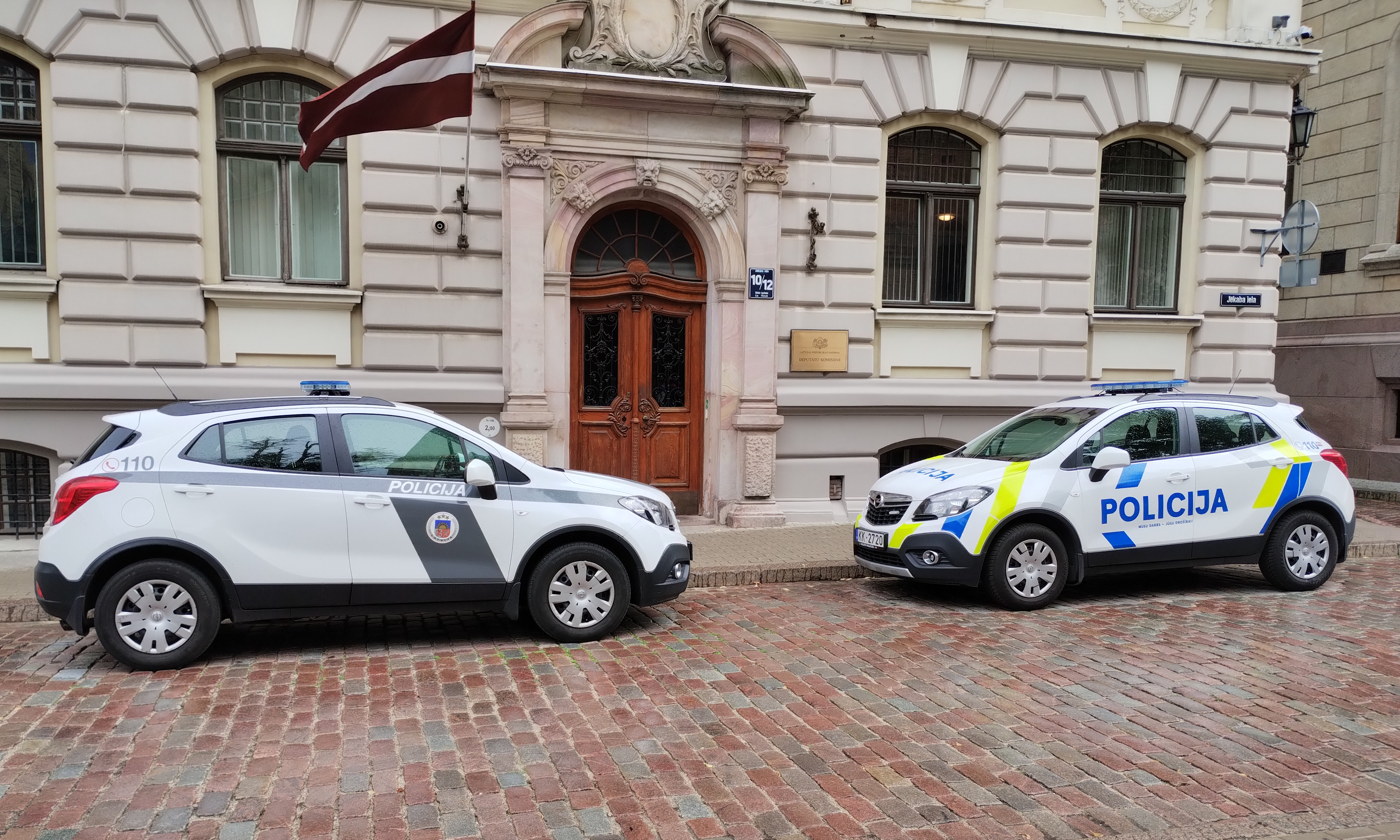
Police cars in Riga

The Latvian State Police (Latvijas Valsts policija, VP) is the official national police agency of Latvia. It is also helped by international policing organizations it is a member of, like Interpol and Europol. Latvia is also a signatory to the terms of the Treaty of Lisbon, which ensures that all EU member states allow free right of immigration, asylum, and are expected to work together to combat crime. In September 2014, Latvian police participated in "Operation Archimedes", an effort organized by Europol to hunt down a cargo train sending stolen cars to Tajikistan.

== See also ==
- International Anti-Corruption Academy
- Group of States Against Corruption
- International Anti-Corruption Day
- ISO 37001 Anti-bribery management systems
- United Nations Convention against Corruption
- OECD Anti-Bribery Convention
- Transparency International
