= Reverta =

Company based in Riga, Latvia

Reverta AS
- Industry: Investment Banking
- Predecessor: Parex Banka (founded 1992, nationalised 2008, split 2010)
- Founded: Latvia (2012)
- Headquarters: Riga, Latvia
- Key people: Solvita Deglava; CEO, Chairperson of the Board
- Products: Financial services, debt restructuring, real estate investing
- Net income: −125,665 euro (2023)
- Total assets: 1,648,407 euro (2023)
- Number of employees: 72
- Website: Reverta

Reverta is a defunct professional-distressed asset management company headquartered in Latvia.

== History ==
Parex Banka was founded in 1992 by Valery Kargin and Viktor Krasovickis as one of the early privately held banks of the post-Soviet era. It initially observed conservative lending practices, allowing it to weather a 1995 Latvian banking crisis and the 1998 Russian financial crisis which brought down Riga Commercial Bank. Emboldened by this initial success, it began to pursue an aggressive expansion into neighboring countries. In 2003, Parex Bank commissioned the building of a new 150,000-m^{2} headquarters in Riga. In 2005, it launched the first American Express cards in Latvia. The bank opened subsidiaries in Switzerland and Lithuania, operating successfully until the 2008 financial crisis.

Much of its lending was within the Baltic states and the bank was heavily exposed to the real estate bubble which followed Latvia, Lithuania and Estonia becoming full European Union members in 2004. Events leading to the September 15, 2008, failure of US bank Lehman Brothers led to a sharp drop in liquidity, causing international investors to withdraw assets.

Parex Bank was nationalised on November 8, 2008. The Latvian state bought 51% of the bank's stocks from the founders for a symbolic 2 Lats. In addition, 34% of the stocks were transferred to the state-owned Mortgage and Land Bank as a security.

On August 1, 2010, Parex was split into good and bad banks, with the good bank spun off as Citadele banka.

Within days of the split, Parex sued both of its founders, accusing them of conflict of interest in their dealings with the bank. In August 2010 it was announced that Chris Gwilliam would replace Nils Melngailis as chairman of the board and CEO.

Parex continued to manage troubled and bad assets, but no longer functioned as a deposit-taking bank. The Parex banking licence was abandoned on March 15, 2012; the company became distressed asset management firm Reverta on May 8, 2012. Ms. Solvita Deglava, is (as of 2014) CEO and chairperson of the board.

Reverta defines itself as specialising in loan restructuring, legal recovery and real estate management with expertise in corporate finance, asset management, legal and security.

== See also ==
- List of banks in Latvia
