= ABLV Bank =

Bank in Latvia

ABLV Bank, AS
- Formerly: Aizkraukles Banka; AB.LV
- Type: JSC
- Industry: Financial services
- Founded: 1993; 33 years ago
- Defunct: 2018; 8 years ago
- Fate: Dissolved
- Headquarters: Riga, Latvia
- Key people: Ernests Bernis; Oļegs Fiļs; Vadim Reinfeld
- Net income: ▲€79.34 mln (2016)
- Total assets: ▲€3849.59 mln (2016)
- Total equity: ▲€366.65 mln (2016)
- Website: www.ablv.com

ABLV Bank was one of the largest private banks in the Baltic States, headquartered in Riga, Latvia with representative offices abroad from 1993 to 2018.

Following accusations of money laundering by the United States Department of the Treasury and continued pressure from national regulatory agencies, on 26 February 2018 the ABLV board voted to start the process of voluntary liquidation. The liquidation plan was approved on June 12.

ABLV had three primary lines of business: private banking, investment and financial planning.

== History ==
The bank was founded on 17 September 1993 on the basis of the Bank of Latvia regional branch in the city of Aizkraukle, thus the bank was named Aizkraukles Banka.

=== Operations ===
In 1995, Ernests Bernis and Oļegs Fiļs (also known as Oleg Fil), became the bank's shareholders and executives. Also in 1995, the bank started expanding its activities and founded a branch in Riga. In the following years, the bank worked in the field of providing services to foreign customers, offering them various banking products, mainly related to funds transferring service.

In 2002 the AB.LV trademark was created.

In 2004, the bank focused on developing a second line of its primary activities—investment management. Two subsidiary companies were founded: ABLV Asset Management, IPAS, providing investment management, and ABLV Capital Markets, IBAS, providing brokerage services.

In 2008, the bank adopted a new strategy, emphasizing development of bespoke financial solutions for customers. Since 2009, the bank offered a third line of services: advisory on asset protection and structuring.

In 2011 the bank's name was changed to ABLV Bank. The new brand and name was intended to increase association with its chosen lines of business, strengthening the bank's reputation internationally, while retaining links to the former brand.

In 2012, ABLV Bank's Luxembourg subsidiaries received a license for banking activities in Luxembourg.

In 2013, ABLV Bank celebrated its 20th anniversary, and a representative office was opened in Cyprus. Euromoney magazine recognized ABLV Bank as the best bank of Latvia.

The group continued to grow, and by 2012, ABLV Group consisted of several companies — ABLV Bank, ABLV Bank Luxembourg, ABLV Asset Management, ABLV Capital Markets, ABLV Corporate Services, ABLV Consulting Services, and Pillar Holding Company. In 2012, ABLV Group had a net profit of €23.4 million, on €2.66 billion of deposits backed by €3.04 billion of assets.

In 2014, ABLV Bank began to be directly supervised by the European Central Bank in liaison with the National Regulator–the Financial and Capital Market Commission (FCMC, FKTK) within the framework of European Banking Supervision.

In 2015 ABLV group opened a representative office in Hong Kong.

2016, an exporter support organization—The Red Jackets—recognized the bank as one of the best Latvian exporter brands. In terms of assets and turnover, the Bank entered the top three in Latvia after Swedbank and SEB. ABLV Bank bonds were traded on the securities exchange Nasdaq Riga.

In 2016, the United States Department of Justice alleged that Gulnara Karimova had fraudulently received $800 million for companies linked to her by three telecommunications operators in Uzbekistan, some of which had been through ABLV Bank and Parex Bank

In 2017, Sally Painter of Blue Star Strategies, who was previously employed at Parex Bank, allegedly intermediated a secret payment from Latvia to Anders Aslund, who was on the Atlantic Council, for him to write an article which stated that ABLV Bank had not been involved in money laundering. (Note: On 19 January 2017 one day before the inauguration of Donald Trump, Mykola Zlochevsky's Burisma Holdings made a very large donation to fund the Atlantic Council.) Previously in 2011, Dombrovskis and Aslund were authors of a book which praised Dombrovskis role at ABLV Bank and falsely denounced Sweden for the collapse of ABLV Bank. (Note: Mārtiņš Bunkus who implicated ABLV Bank in numerous very large money laundering schemes was assassinated on 30 May 2018.)

=== Liquidation ===
Since 2018, ABLV is in voluntary liquidation.

On February 13, 2018, the FinCEN (Financial Crimes Enforcement Network of the US Department of Treasury) published a message with a variety of accusations against ABLV — from suspicions of complicity in money laundering and avoiding currency controls to assisting North Korea in implementation of its nuclear program. Despite the fact that the "accused" had the right to reasonably respond to this message within 60 days, which was done in April 2018 by FinCEN. On February 24, 2018, the European Central Bank (ECB) announced that ABLV will be liquidated in accordance with the laws of Latvia.

The Latvian authorities chose not to capitalize the bank, and Finance Minister Dana Reizniece-Ozola and Prime Minister Māris Kučinskis were quick to declare that the liquidation of the bank would not harm the economy; at the same time, the Luxembourg Commercial Court rejected the request of the Luxembourg regulator to liquidate ABLV Bank Luxembourg.

In the report of the lawyers of the American branch of the international company WimerHale, attracted by the bank, it was indicated that FinCEN not only failed to prove the accusations against the Latvian bank, but did not even study the money laundering prevention system created in the bank and ignored its significant improvements in recent years. The letter was signed by David Cohen, former CIA Deputy Director and Comptroller of FinCEN, now a partner at WilmerHale.

In July 2022, Latvian prosecutors charged ABLV Bank's co-owner and CEO, Ernests Bernis, former deputy CEO, Vadims Reinfelds, and others with money laundering. The indictment alleged that, starting in 2010, Bernis led an organized crime group that utilized shell firms incorporated and administered by International Overseas Services to launder illicit funds. The bank's division, ABLV Corporate Services, was accused of helping cover up the illegal activities.

On September 26, 2024, FinCEN submitted a notice to the Federal Register withdrawing its finding that ABLV Bank, AS is a financial institution of primary money laundering concern, as well as the related notice of proposed rulemaking (NPRM) seeking to impose special measure five pursuant to section 311 of the USA PATRIOT Act (section 311).

== Shareholders ==
The bank's controlling interest was held by Ernests Bernis (43%) and Oļegs Fiļs (43%).

== Sanctions ==
ABLV was sanctioned by the United States for facilitating prohibited transactions for North Korea. The bank has been banned from the American financial network. Bill Browder has alleged that the bank was being used by Russians for money laundering purposes, a complaint being investigated by the European Central Bank and the Latvian Anti-Laundering authority.

== See also ==
- Parex Bank
- Banka Baltija
- Ūkio bankas
- Martins Bunkus
- Daphne Caruana Galizia
- Pilatus Bank
- Anti-Money Laundering Authority
- List of banks in Latvia
