= Banka Baltija =

Bank based in Riga, Latvia

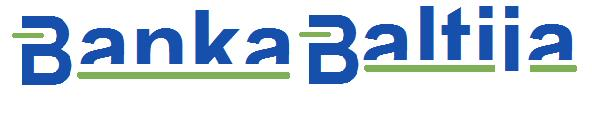
- Industry: Banking, Financial services
- Founded: 1993
- Defunct: June 12, 1995
- Fate: Bankrupt
- Headquarters: Riga, Latvia
- Area served: Latvia
- Key people: Aleksandrs Lavents (Chairman); Tālis Freimanis (President)
- Number of employees: 1,300 (1994)

Banka Baltija was a Latvian bank which in the early 1990s was one of the largest banks in the country. It was founded in 1993, but closed down due to bankruptcy in June 1995.

== History ==
Banka Baltija, associated with the father and son Emīls Lavents (born 1923, Odesa) and Aleksandrs Lavents (born August 9, 1959, Anapa) respectively, was founded in 1993 and experienced very rapid growth. It became the largest bank in Latvia by offering high interest rates to savers and attracted many clients. Its assets rose from US$25 million from 1993, to 242 million dollars in 1994, reaching 500 million in 1995. The bank's capital rose from 1 million in 1993, 20 million in 1994 to 44 million in 1995. The bank employed several Chekists and had links to the “Pārdaugava” organized crime network. The Group of 24 loan to Latvia, which later became a landmark case of government mismanagement, passed through Banka Baltija. Banka Baltija had 37 branches and 49 settlement groups all over Latvia employing 1300 people. In April 1995, when a financial crisis started, Banka Baltija had 283 million dollars in deposits and had given credits of 283 dollars.

=== Bankruptcy ===
On June 27, 1995, following the a bank crisis, The Supreme Court of Latvia (lv) found Banka Baltija insolvent. In 2007 bank's chairman Aleksandrs Lavents and president Tālis Freimanis were sentenced to imprisonment and Alvis Līdums who was accused of very large scale embezzlement was acquitted. On March 3, 2018 Banka Baltija was excluded from the Registry of Enterprises of Latvia. "Invest-Riga", an auditing firm, liquidated the bank and completed this on March 22, 2018.

== See also ==
- Parex Bank
- ABLV Bank
- Economy of Latvia
- List of banks in Latvia
