= Valērijs Kargins =

Latvian economist

- Вале́рий Миха́йлович Каргин
- Born: March 27, 1961 (age 64); Riga, Latvia
- Known for: Former president of Parex Bank

Valērijs Kargins or Valery Mikhailovich Kargin (Russian: Вале́рий Миха́йлович Каргин; born 27 March 1961, in Riga) is a Latvian economist and banker was the president of Parex Banka, from 1998 to 2008.

In October 2000, he and Viktor Krasovitsky had accumulated over 200 million lats together. He created the first travel agency and the first currency exchange corporation in the Soviet Union.

== Biography ==
Kargins was born in Riga on 27 March 1961. His parents were Mikhail Kargin (Russian: Михаил Каргин) b. 1926 in Novosibirsk Oblast) and Dina Grozdeva (Russian: Дина Гроздева) b. 15 October 1931 in Tatarsky District, Novosibirsk Oblast), who was raised by a Soviet serviceman. After his parents were married in 1951 at Novosibirsk where his father was a senior lieutenant in the Soviet Army, they moved to Riga. However, he was raised by his stepfather Georgy (Russian: Георгий) whom the young Kargin considered his real father. He has two brothers: Georgy (Russian: Георгий), who is older, and Vadim (Russian: Вадим b. 1969), who is a younger step-brother.

He worked at Komutator in Riga for two months as a loader but he did not enjoy physical labor so he enrolled at university to study journalism. In 1983, he finished the faculty of journalism at the University of Latvia. Then, from 1983 to 1991, he opened one of the first travel agencies in the Soviet Union, in the Latvian Soviet Socialist Republic (Latvian SSR).

Then, between 1988 and 1992, he became the director of Parex corporation, which is a travel agency and currency exchange that he and his business partner Viktor Krasovitsky (Latvian: Viktors Krasovickis) formed.

In 1991, he became the first to create a currency exchange corporation in the Union of Soviet Socialist Republics (USSR). The following year, he became the president of Parex Bank. From 1998 to 2008, he was the president and the chairman of Parex Bank.

In 2003, he was the richest man in the Baltics with an estimated wealth of around €300 million.

In October 2008 before the demise of Parex Bank in November 2008, Kargins wealth was estimated by Baltic Screen to be €309 million (220 million lats).

== Personal ==
Ksenia Sobchak interviewed Kargins in Riga about the time that she and Oksana Robski released the perfume Married to a Millionaire (Russian: «Zамуж за миллионера»).

He has two sons with Tatyana Kargins from his first marriage which ended in divorce in 2006 and, from his second marriage, a daughter with Anna Barinova.
