= Benchmark price =

Guideline price for international trade

Benchmark price (BP) is the price per unit of quantity in a specific segment of the international marketplace, set by the country or producers' organization that consistently exports the largest quantity or volume in a marketplace such as the London Metal Exchange. This price is set periodically, usually monthly and serves as a guideline for international trade.

The term "benchmark" can be applied to many aspects of public concern, such as quality, services, attitudes and others, denoting the highest standards achieved in such spheres. For example, a school or university could be cited as setting the benchmark for education. A hotel could be cited as setting the benchmark for quality of service. The phrase "international benchmark price", however, is synonymous with prices of commodities in international trade.

An example is the benchmark prices that apply to crude oil in the international marketplace.

It is not mandatory for exporting countries or importing countries to use the benchmark price as international trade is based on favourable prices.

The benchmark price is often the most important consideration when determining export prices.

A specific raw material or other similar goods will sell for more or less than the benchmark price depending on how it compares to the benchmark commodity (percentage of undesirable components such as sulfur, for example) and where it is to be delivered, if other than the benchmark price's delivery point.

== See also ==
- Benchmark (crude oil)
- Price benchmarking
