= Mārtiņš Kazāks =

Latvian economist and governor

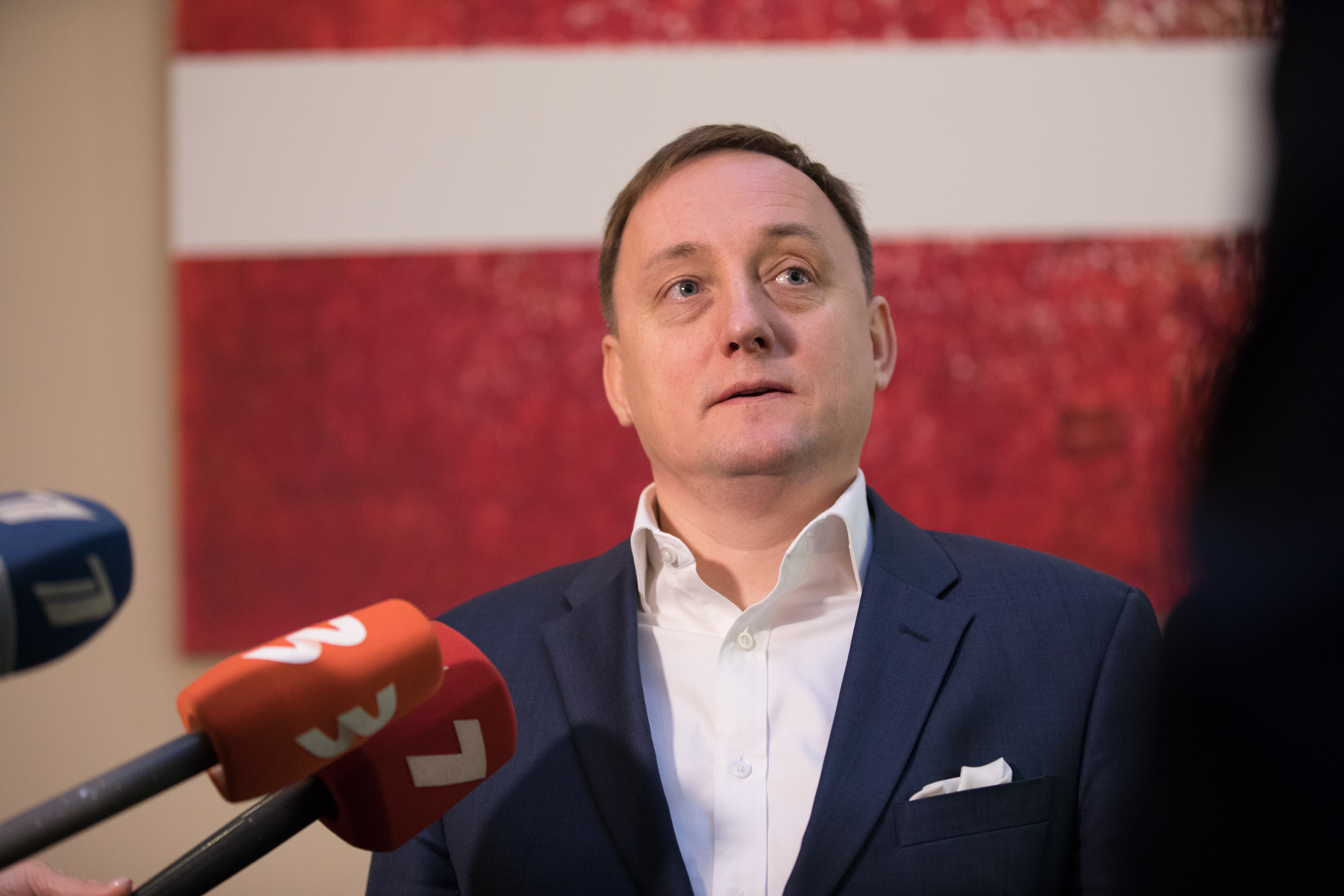
- Born: September 19, 1973 (age 52)
- Education: University of Latvia
- Occupation: Governor of the central Bank of Latvia

Mārtiņš Kazāks is a Latvian economist and the current governor of the central Bank of Latvia since December 2019.

== Early life and education ==
Kazāks was born on September 19, 1973, in Liepāja. He finished his secondary education at Liepāja Rainis 6th Secondary School. In 1995, he graduated from the University of Latvia with a bachelor's degree in economics.

In 1996, Kazāks received a degree in economics from the University of Cambridge. He received his master's degree in economics from the Queen Mary University of London in 1997, and a doctorate in economics in 2005.

== Career ==
Kazāks was the chief economist of the Latvian branch of Hansabanka (now Swedbank) from 2005 to 2018. From 2018 to 2019, he was a member of the Council of the Bank of Latvia.

== Other activities ==
- European Systemic Risk Board (ESRB), Ex-Officio Member of the General Board (since 2019)
