= Market tightness =

Measure of market liquidity

Market tightness is a measure of the liquidity of a market. High market tightness indicates relatively low liquidity and high transaction costs, whereas low market tightness indicates high liquidity and low transaction costs. For example, during the dotcom bubble, information technology companies were very difficult and expensive to buy a part of, through stock, loan, or other methods, due to the tightness of competition in the market.

== Equity markets ==
In equity markets, market tightness is measured using percentage relative spread.

== Housing markets ==
In housing markets, measures of market tightness include the probability of achieving a sale and house price appreciation. Tighter housing markets result in greater seller bargaining power and higher sale prices.

== Labour markets ==
Labour market tightness is measured as the ratio of job vacancies per unemployed person or jobseeker.
