= Citadele Banka =

Bank based in Riga, Latvia

Banka Citadele AS
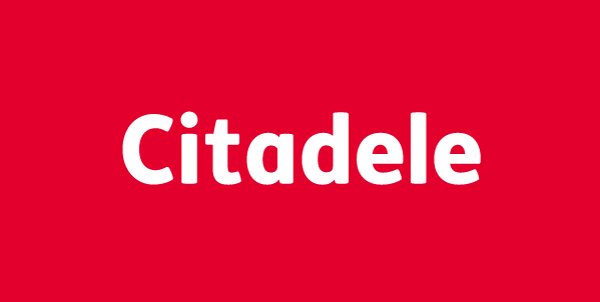
- Industry: Banking
- Founded: 30 June 2010
- Headquarters: Riga, Latvia
- Products: Financial services, Insurance
- Operating income: ▼€221.5 million (2025)
- Net income: ▼€84.7 million (2025)
- Total assets: ▲€5.4 billion (2025)
- Owners: Ripplewood Holdings (73.4%); EBRD (24.6%); Management, employees and other investors (1.9%); Citadele Banka (0.1%)
- Number of employees: ▼1,288 (2025)
- Website: www.citadele.lv

AS Citadele banka is a Latvian bank and financial and asset manager. The principal market of operation for the Citadele Group is the Baltic States.

Citadele banka is the parent company of a Group offering banking, financial and private capital management services in its home market and through its international presence.

Citadele is one of two institutions created in 2010 from a state administered split of Parex Bank into viable and distressed banking assets. The other is Reverta. Parex was privately founded 1992 and taken over by the Latvian government on 8 November 2008 during the 2008 Latvian financial crisis. The bad bank assets remained with Parex, now renamed Reverta.

Citadele has been designated in 2020 as a Significant Institution under the criteria of European Banking Supervision, and as a consequence is directly supervised by the European Central Bank.

In 2024 the CEO Johanas Åkerblomas was replaced by Rūta Ežerskienė.

== Name ==
The name Citadele is drawn from the Italian word “citadella” meaning a small city, a powerful fortress, and the main fortification at the heart of the feudal city which also serves as the administrative and cultural centre. The headquarters of the Citadele Group is located at 2a Republic Square, Riga.

== Ownership ==
At the end of 2025, 73.4% of Citadela Bankas shares were owned by an international group of investors represented by Ripplewood Advisors LLC. The European Bank for Reconstruction and Development (EBRD) continues to own 24.6% of the shares, while the management, employees and other investors own 1.9% of the shares. Citadele Banka owns 0.1% of the shares.

== Citadele expansion to the Baltic countries ==
Following its establishment in Latvia, Citadele Banka expanded its operations into Estonia and Lithuania.

=== Estonia ===
Citadele opened a branch in Estonia in 2010, with a focus on small to medium-sized businesses. In 2017, the branch started offering retail services.

In 2022, Citadele and the EIB Group agreed on a framework that will provide at least €460 million in new loans to companies in Estonia, Lithuania and Latvia, with a focus on small and medium-sized enterprises and climate-related projects.

=== Lithuania ===
Citadele initially operated in Lithuania through its subsidiary AB Citadele bankas since 2010. In 2018, the Citadele Group started the process of restructuring the subsidiary into a branch. The restructuring process was completed in January 2019, when AB Citadele bankas legally became the Lithuanian branch of Citadele Banka.

In March 2020, Citadele Bank invested €10 million in a partnership with fintech firm SME Finance. It was the first collaboration between a bank and fintech in Lithuania. In 2021, the bank launched Klix Pay Later.

In 2025, Citadele partnered with the European Investment Fund under the InvestEU programme for up to €138 million in preferential financing for SMEs and microbusinesses across the Baltics. In 2026, Citadele partnered with ČEKIS cash register and Site.pro accounting software for an integration as a part of i.EKA cash registers optimization project.

== See also ==
- List of banks in the euro area
- List of banks in Latvia
