= Non-performing loan =

Loan that is unlikely to be repaid

A non-performing loan (NPL) or non-performing asset (NPA) is a bank loan that is subject to late repayment or is unlikely to be repaid by the borrower in full. Non-performing loans represent a major challenge for the banking sector, as they reduce profitability. They are often claimed to prevent banks from lending more to businesses and consumers, which in turn slows economic growth, although this theory is disputed. Several jurisdictions have prudential regulations that require a specific portion of a bank's NPL to be reserved to offset potential losses.

In the European Union, the management of NPLs resulting from the 2008 financial crisis has become a politically sensitive topic, culminating in 2017 with the decision by the European Council to task the European Commission to launch an action plan to tackle NPLs. The action plan supports the development of a secondary market for NPLs and the creation of Asset Management Companies (aka bad banks). In December 2020, this action plan was revised in the wake of the COVID-19 pandemic crisis.

== Definition ==
Non-performing loans are generally recognised as per the following criteria:

- Payments of interest and principal are past due by 90 days or more
- At least 90 days of interest payments have been capitalized, refinanced or delayed by agreement
- Payments are less than 90 days overdue, but there are other reasons to doubt that they will be made in full.

== Challenges and difficulties of resolving NPLs ==
In general, the management of NPLs is made difficult due to a variety of reasons:

- Lack of a standard, accepted definition of NPLs, and no strong reporting frameworks
- Lack of any standard valuation methodology whereby financial institutions can provision for losses arising from NPL resolution.
- Incentives for banks and financial institutions to understate their NPLs in order to avoid reputational risk of facing higher funding cost on financial markets
- Unwillingness of banks to sell NPLs because of the costs associated with such an exercise, which could add to the NPL losses. This in turn could hurt their capital adequacy.
- Consumer protection regulations

== Policy response and NPL management models ==
There are two main approaches for dealing with NPLs:

- A decentralized approach involves regulating banks so they take measures to prevent and resolve the NPLs in their loan books, for example by legislating accounting rules to force banks to provision against future losses, or by setting up legislative frameworks and other measures to foster a secondary market for NPLs. In this approach, banks are left alone to manage their own bad loans by giving them incentives, legislative powers, or special accounting or fiscal advantages.
- A centralized approach takes the form of a central organization/agency such as a "bad bank" (also called "Asset Management Company").

In practice, both approaches can be used simultaneously, as illustrated by the European Commission's action plan on NPLs, while some authors have argued that systemic crisis generally require a more centralized approach.

Proactive measures to tackle NPLs include:

- Impose more transparency on NPLs reporting by banks
- Accounting framework (such as IFRS9)
- Prudential Supervision of banks including the levels of capital requirements and buffers.
- Proactive incentives for banks to offer forbearance to distressed consumers and other debt relief mechanisms
- Setting up Asset Management Companies (AMCs) or bad banks. These companies use public or bank funds to remove NPAs from the bank books. For example, the Korea Asset Management Corporation purchased as much as 80% of bad loans at market rate following the Asian crises.
- Fostering secondary markets for NPLs that can offer the mechanism and liquidity required to write off bad loans. Many companies see a business opportunity in buying NPL's. Buying NPL's from financial institutions with a discount, can be a lucrative business. Companies pay from 1% to 80% of the total loan and become the legal owner (creditor). The discount depends on the age of the loan, secured/ unsecured, age debtor, personal/ commercial debt, area of residence, etc.
- Securitization of NPLs (i.e. packaging a bulk of NPLs into a pooled financial product such as a covered bond or asset backed security) may help preserve the market value of the NPL package to a level closer to their nominal or real economic value, thus lessening the cost of selling NPLs for banks.
- Corporate Governance

== Non-performing loans in the context of the COVID-19 pandemic crisis ==
Although the 2020 has seen an actual decrease of non performing loans, the issue is expected to represent a major challenge for the banking industry in the post-COVID-19 era. The ECB has warned that the amount of NPLs in the Eurozone could reach up to 1.4 trillions euros of bad loans, however academic literature suggest the future rise of NPLs will be primarily driven by the pace of the economic recovery after COVID-19, and in particular the level of unemployment. In the context of the COVID-19 crisis, the deactivation of debt payment moratoria and tax deferral are also likely to cause an increase of NPLs.

To prepare for the likely new wave of NPLs, the ECB Supervisory Board's chair Andrea Enria has proposed the creation of a European Bad Bank and has imposed a ban on dividend distribution by banks, in a move to pressure banks to proactively tackle NPLs. The ECB has also indicated to work on the development of an "Amazon-style" platform to allow banks and investors to trade NPLs on a secondary market.

Meanwhile the European Commission has revised its action plan in December 2020 by focusing on speeding up the fostering of a secondary market for NPLs and to offer support for national Asset Management Companies. The proposal was met with criticism by civil society groups.

== Non-performing property loans (NPPLs) ==
Non-performing property loans are found to lead to banking crises. The need to identify the relationships between macroeconomic factors and NPLs had been crucial for governments and financial institutions to monitor the economy and undertake necessary policies or decisions to control and reduce the number of NPPLs in the financial system. The economic crisis caused by a rise of NPPLs in any particular country had been known to spread to other economies, as seen in the United States of America’s subprime mortgage crisis. During the sub-prime mortgage crisis, the ASEAN Economic Community (AEC) has gone through difficult periods of volatile NPPLs and the issue of NPPLs remains a major challenge amongst ASEAN member countries. Early research of NPLs was dominated by internal procedures and specific attributes of the lending banks in approving, controlling and monitoring the loans to ensure they remain active and not impaired. In recent years, research showed that property loans made up the highest percentage of NPLs in countries like Malaysia and US. This had refocused research into the how macroeconomic conditions affect non-performing property loans.

== See also ==
- Default (finance)
- National Asset Management Agency
