= Ilmārs Rimšēvičs =

Latvian economist (born 1965)

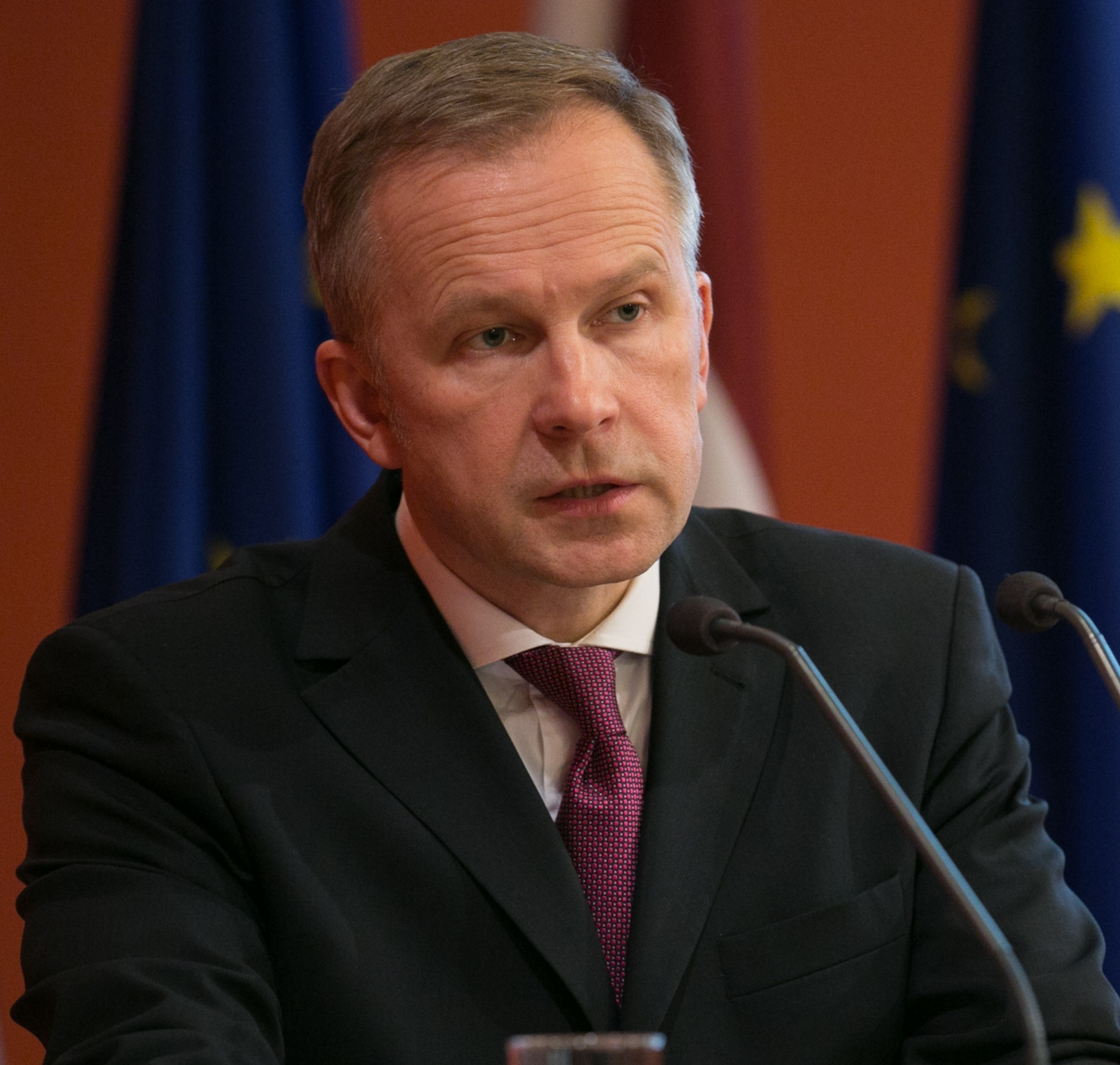
- Ilmārs Rimšēvičs (2013)
- Born: 30 April 1965 (age 61); Riga, Latvian SSR, Soviet Union
- Education: Riga Technical University
- Occupation: Economist
- Years active: 2001–present

Ilmārs Rimšēvičs (born 30 April 1965) is a Latvian economist who served as the governor of the central Bank of Latvia from 2001 to 2019. In that position, he was also a member of the Governing Council of the European Central Bank.

== Education ==
He studied engineering economics at the Riga University of Technology, graduating in 1990. He was a member of the student corporation Lettonia. His studies continued at Clarkson University in New York, completing a master's degree in business administration and management in 1992, whereafter he was appointed deputy governor and chairman of the board of the Bank of Latvia the same year.

== Controversies ==
Rimšēvičs was detained by the Corruption Prevention and Combating Bureau (KNAB) on 18 February 2018, while officers raided his home in Langstini and offices at the Bank of Latvia. The next day, he was released on bail, which was paid by Andris Kreislers. State Prosecutor's office has charged Rimševičs with accepting a bribe. In 2013, Rimšēvičs had numerous conversations with Maris Martinsons in a sauna (Latvian: “Taureņu” pirtī) on the outskirts of Riga which were recorded by agents of the KNAB. Allegedly, the payment was a bribe paid by the shareholders of the Latvian bank Trasta komercbanka (TKB) through Martinsons, because this bank credited Martinsons' formerly owned payday loan firm "4Finance" and this payment facilitated Rimšēvičs in obtaining a property through MM Investments, which was owned by Martinsons son Marcis, in Jurmala at 2 Baznicas Street. The case is pending.

In May 2018, a Latvian intelligence agency stripped Rimšēvičs of his government security clearances over concerns about his numerous travels to Russia.

Upon the end of this third term at the end of 2019, Rimšēvičs was succeeded as governor by Mārtiņš Kazāks.
