= Bank of Latvia =

National central bank

Bank of Latvia (Latvian: Latvijas Banka)

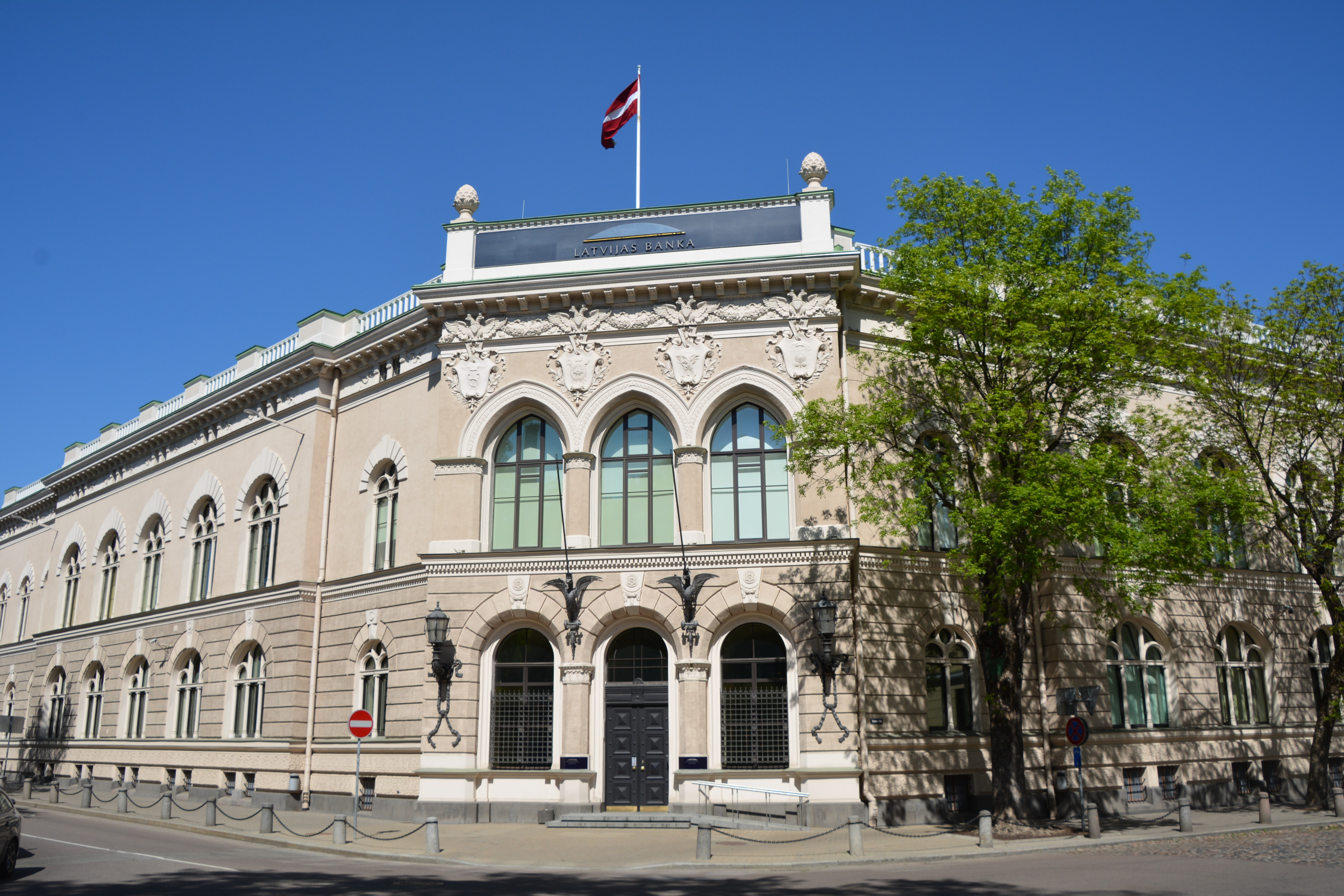
- Head office in Riga, formerly branch building of the State Bank of the Russian Empire
- Central bank of: Latvia
- Headquarters: Riga
- Established: 7 September 1922
- Ownership: 100% state ownership
- Governor: Mārtiņš Kazāks
- Reserves: US$3.05 billion
- Preceded by: State Savings and Credit Bank
- Succeeded by: European Central Bank (2014)^{1}
- Website: www.bank.lv
- ^{1} The Bank of Latvia still exists, but many functions have been taken over by the European Central Bank.

The Bank of Latvia (Latvian: Latvijas Banka,) is the national central bank for Latvia within the Eurosystem. It was the Latvian central bank from 1922 to 2013, albeit with a long suspension between 1940 and 1992. It issued the Latvian lats (1922–1940), then the Latvian ruble (1992–1993) and second lats (1993–2013). The Bank of Latvia's administration is located in Riga.

In addition to its monetary role, the Bank of Latvia is also a financial supervisory authority. In that capacity, it increasingly implements policies set at the European Union level. It is the national competent authority for Latvia within European Banking Supervision. It is a voting member of the respective Boards of Supervisors of the European Banking Authority (EBA), European Insurance and Occupational Pensions Authority (EIOPA), and European Securities and Markets Authority (ESMA). It is Latvia's designated National Resolution Authority and plenary session member of the Single Resolution Board (SRB). It provides the permanent single common representative for Latvia in the Supervisory composition of the General Board of the Anti-Money Laundering Authority (AMLA). It is also a member of the European Systemic Risk Board (ESRB).

== History ==
On 7 September 1922, the Constitutional Assembly adopted the Law on the Establishment of the Bank of Latvia, which granted its issuance privilege. The Bank's interim statutes were approved on 19 September 1922 by the Cabinet of Ministers, with its initial capital set at 10 million lats. On 23 April 1923, the Saeima approved a permanent Statute of the Bank of Latvia, signed by President Jānis Čakste on 2 July. The bank was headed by a council and board. The council consisted of a chairman, a deputy, and 11 members; the board included a director general, his deputy, and three directors. The bank's mandate extended beyond a pure monetary authority, as it also entailed a developmental role with the possibility of allocating short-term credit to industry and agriculture.

On 17 June 1940, Latvia was occupied and was incorporated into the USSR on 5 August. On 25 July, the Law on the Nationalization of Banks and Large Industrial Enterprises was adopted. After the Second World War, both money emission and the Treasury's functions were performed by the USSR State Bank, but the money system of the Latvian SSR was under its full control.

On 2 March 1990, the Latvian SSR Supreme Council passed the Law "On Banks" and the decision "On the Bank of Latvia". It determined that the Bank of Latvia, a local central bank, was reestablished as an independent state bank, a money issuing center, a central bank in relation to commercial banks, an organizer of the execution of the state budget, and a monetary policy regulator.

However, only after the Declaration of 4 May 1990 on the restoration of independence of the Republic of Latvia and the collapse of the USSR with the decision of the Republic of Latvia Supreme Council of 3 September 1991 "On the Reorganization of Banking Institutions in the Territory of the Republic of Latvia", the Bank of Latvia became the only central and issuing bank. It took over the ownership and structure of the USSR banks, Latvijas Republikānisko banku, and other state credit institutions.

On 4 March 1992, the Supreme Council of the Republic of Latvia passed the Law "On the Acquisition of the Bank of Latvia established in 1922". The Bank of Latvia's status as the central bank of the country and the issue bank was definitively consolidated by the laws of the Republic of Latvia "On Banks" and "On the Bank of Latvia" adopted on 19 May 1992. For the first time in Latvia, the independence of the national central bank from the government policy was ensured through legislation. The Law "On the Bank of Latvia" did not envisage its commercial activities, therefore, a decision was taken on the restructuring and privatization of 49 Bank of Latvia branches.

== Monetary policy strategy and exchange rate policy ==
Like most central banks of the world, the main goal of the Bank of Latvia is to provide inflation at a certain level.

After joining the European Union (EU), until its membership in the Economic and Monetary Union (EMU), the Bank of Latvia was able to pursue its monetary policy, provided that it is in line with the common EU interests, does not harm the development of other EU Member States, and contributes to economic stability.

Membership in the EU also envisages joining EMU and the euro. After joining the EU, Latvia had to demonstrate its ability to meet the EMU accession criteria. One of these criteria was the two-year membership of the Exchange Rate Mechanism II (ERM II). Latvia joined it on 2 May 2005. ERM II means that at least two years before the euro changeover, the lats had been pegged to the euro and the exchange rate of the lats against the euro may fluctuate by no more than +/− 15% against the lats' pegging rate in euro.

In order to achieve its main goal, as well as successfully entering the EMU, the Bank of Latvia implemented a fixed exchange rate strategy (EUR 1 = Ls 0.702804). Fluctuations around the fixed coupling rate are possible within +/− 1%. The Bank of Latvia had been implementing the lats attraction policy since February 1994, when the lats was pegged to the SDR basket of currencies. The lats was pegged to the euro on 1 January 2005.

Also, at the beginning of 2006 and 2007, the Bank of Latvia operated a refinancing rate instrument, a rate for travel. In a situation where banks do not intend to actively use the instruments offered by the Bank of Latvia, the increase of the refinancing rate has a more signaling function.

== Research ==
The Bank of Latvia also serves as a research center, producing economic and financial analysis and providing data on economic trends and developments in Latvia and the wider region.

== Management ==
The Bank of Latvia is managed by the Bank's Board and Management Board. The council consists of eight people: the president of the bank, his deputy, and six members of the council. The Bank's Supervisory Council is managed by the President of the Bank of Latvia. The Governing Council of the Bank of Latvia takes decisions on behalf of the Bank of Latvia.

For the practical work and operational management of the Bank of Latvia, the Bank Council establishes a permanent board of six people. The Bank's Governor approves the structure of the Bank of Latvia and recruits and dismisses the Bank of Latvia's employees.

=== Governors ===
- Kārlis Vanags (1 November 1922 – 14 October 1923)
- Edgars Švēde (15 October 1923 – 21 September 1926)
- Kārlis Vanags (22 September 1926 – 13 July 1940)
- Kārlis Zandersons (13 July 1940 – 21 July 1940)
- Artūrs Graudiņš (26 March – 30 July 1990)
- Pāvils Sakss (31 July 1990 – 3 September 1991)
- Einars Repše (3 September 1991 – 20 December 2001)
- Ilmārs Rimšēvičs (21 December 2001 – 20 December 2019)
- Mārtiņš Kazāks (21 December 2019 – present)

== See also ==
- Economy of Latvia
- Latvia and the euro
- List of central banks
- List of financial supervisory authorities by country
