= Signet Bank =

Bank of Latvia

AS Signet Bank
- Company type: Private
- Founded: 1991
- Headquarters: Riga, Latvia
- Key people: Robert Idelson (Chairman of the Board)
- Net income: 5,666,000 euro (2023)
- Total assets: 406,118,000 euro (2023)
- Number of employees: 149 (2023)
- Subsidiaries: Magnetiq Bank
- Website: signetbank.com

Signet Bank (until 2022 Expobank) is a Latvian bank operating in the corporate and investment segment. It was founded in 1991.

For investment management, the company JSC Signet Asset Management Latvia IPS was established. Since December 2023, Signet Bank owns the company JSC Magnetiq Bank (until 2024 JSC LPB Bank), whose strategy is focused on the needs of financial technology firms, startups, and e-commerce service providers, offering them banking infrastructure, segregated accounts, and payment solutions.

== History ==
=== Expobank ===
Logo of JSC Expobank

On 6 December 1991, the bank JSC Latvijas tirdzniecības komercbanka, Rīga "TIRDZNIECĪBAS BANKA" was founded. On 29 April 1993, it was renamed JSC, Rīga "LATVIJAS TIRDZNIECĪBAS KOMERCBANKA". On 13 December 1994, the bank's name was changed to JSC "Latvijas tirdzniecības banka". On 24 April 2009, it became JSC LTB Bank. In 2010, a branch was opened in the Republic of Cyprus.

In February 2012, Russian entrepreneur Igor Kim, a former shareholder of MDM Bank, became the sole owner of LTB Bank. On 28 April 2012, the bank was renamed JSC Expobank. In 2014, a representative office was opened in Hong Kong. According to the 2015 financial report, the bank's net profit was €15.39 million. As of 31 December 2015, the bank's capital adequacy ratio was 44.73%, and the liquidity ratio was 108%.

On 30 September 2021, Expobank’s assets amounted to €86.8 million, making it the smallest bank in Latvia by assets.

=== Signet Bank ===
On 26 May 1992, JSC "Latvijas biznesa banka" (LBB) was founded. Its shareholders were major Russian banks and entrepreneurs. In 2011, LBB reorganized by selling most of its assets, including to the Latvian branch of the Estonian bank Eesti Krediidipank. Afterward, LBB operated on a limited basis, and by the end of 2012 it ranked 25th in Latvia by assets.

On 21 May 2013, Russian businessman Andrey Vdovin acquired 100% of LBB's shares. He was co-owner of the VMHY group, which included Russian banks M2M Private Bank and ATB Bank. Since 2011, an investment management company owned by Vdovin, M2M Asset Management, had operated in Latvia and was later merged with the acquired bank. On 19 July 2013, LBB was renamed JSC Bank M2M Europe. On 27 September 2017, it was renamed JSC Signet Bank. On 20 October 2017, IPAS M2M Asset Management was renamed IPAS Signet Asset Management.

=== Merged bank ===
On 16 February 2022, it was announced that Igor Kim had sold Expobank's shares to Signet Bank. On 11 July 2022, the Financial and Capital Market Commission approved the merger of Signet Bank and Expobank, which would thereafter operate as a single credit institution under the Signet Bank brand. The former Expobank website was redirected to Signet Bank. On 12 July, JSC Signet Bank was renamed JSC SB Resolution (liquidated on 4 January 2023), while JSC Expobank adopted the name JSC Signet Bank.

On 1 December 2023, JSC Signet Bank submitted a merger notification to the Competition Council regarding the acquisition of decisive influence over JSC LPB Bank. On 7 December, the Competition Council approved the merger, and on 11 December JSC Signet Bank completed the acquisition of JSC LPB Bank. It was planned that LPB Bank would focus on servicing FinTech companies, providing Banking as a Service (BaaS) solutions, and developing innovative digital financial products. In 2024, JSC LPB Bank was renamed JSC Magnetiq Bank. On 6 December 2024, JSC Signet Bank acquired 51% of the share capital of SIA AgroCredit Latvia, a lender to farmers.

The Chairman of the Board of the Signet Bank since 2013 is Robert Idelson, who was a former employee of Parex Bank since 2003 and a vice-president at Citadele Bank.

== Ownership ==
The shareholders of JSC Signet Bank are: Signet Acquisition III (23.05%; a U.S. company owned by Alexander Solovey), JSC RIT Group (18.35%; owned by the Dan Rapoport family), SIA Reglink (14.98%), Natālija Petkeviča (9.27%), Solrut Holding Company LLC (9.07%; U.S. company), Leonid Kaplan (7.53%), SIA Slink (5.99%), SIA ID Family Foundation (4.89%), and others (6.87%).

== See also ==
- List of banks in the euro area
- List of banks in Latvia
