= List of banks in Latvia =

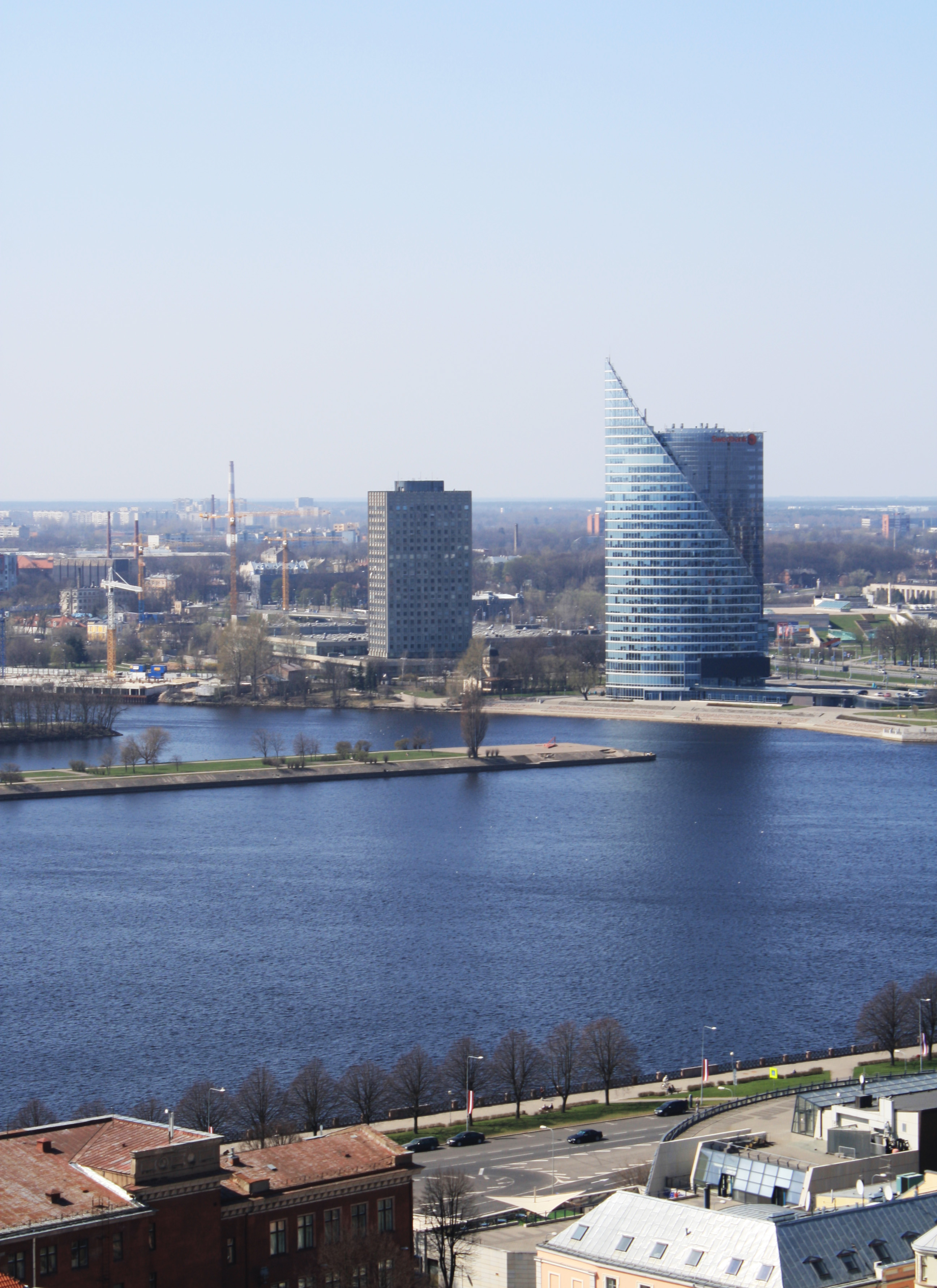
Swedbank Tower (right), Riga

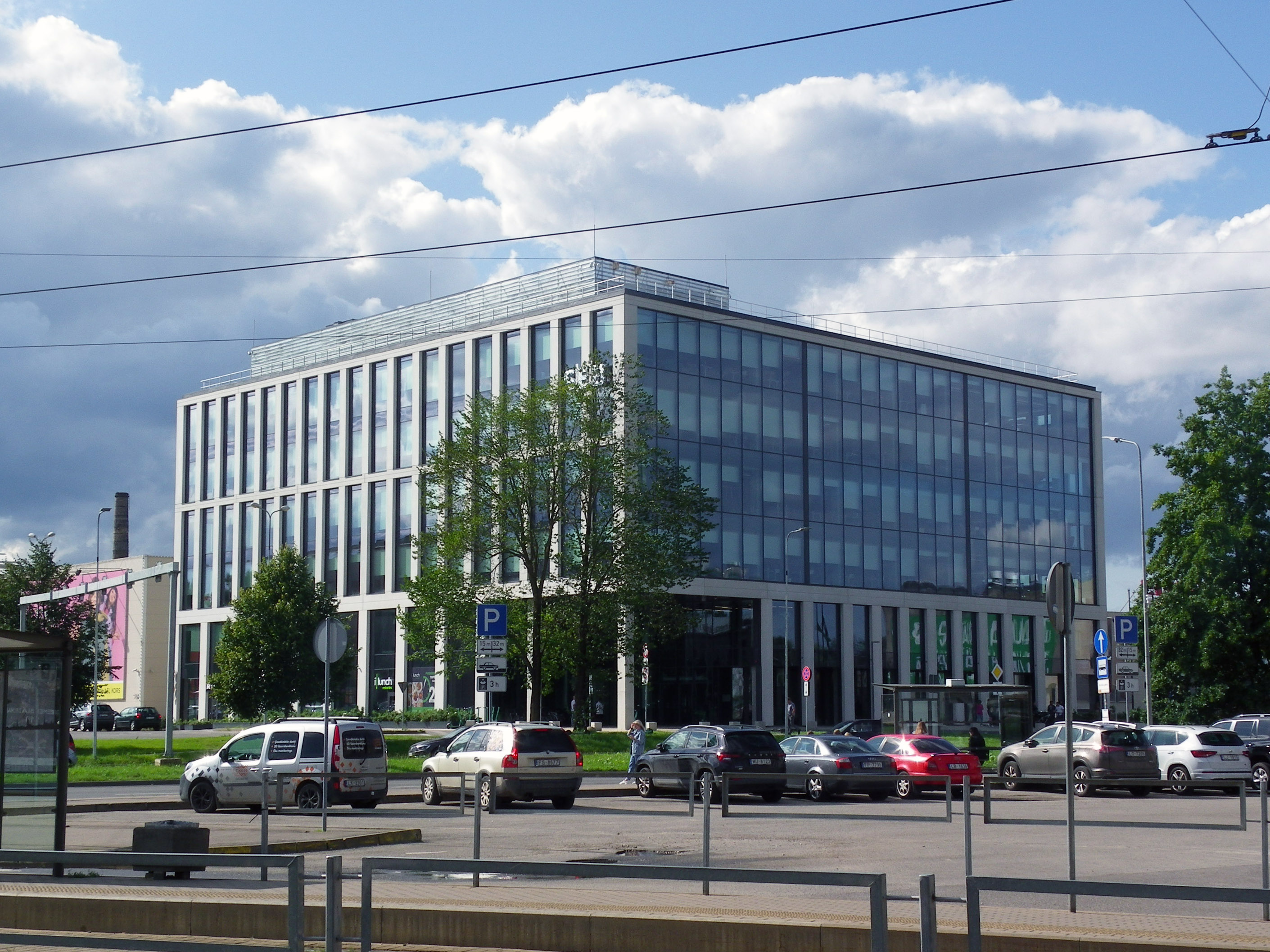
SEB Global Services Center, Riga

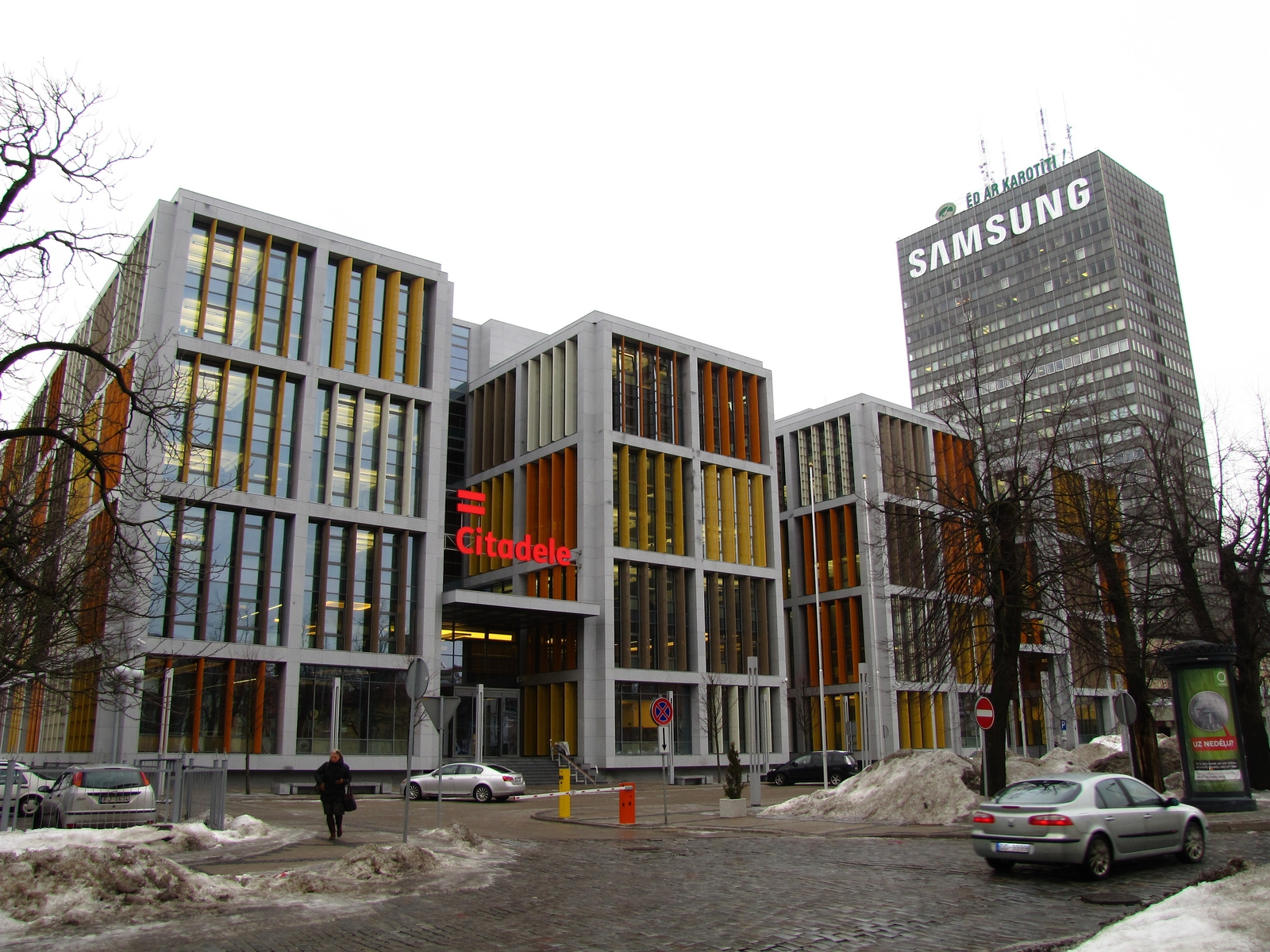
Citadele Banka head office, Riga

Luminor branch, Riga

The following list of banks in Latvia is to be understood within the framework of the European single market and European banking union, which means that Latvia's banking system is more open to cross-border banking operations than peers outside of the EU. The list leaves aside the country's National Central Bank within the Eurosystem, the Bank of Latvia.

== Policy framework ==
European banking supervision distinguishes between significant institutions (SIs) and less significant institutions (LSIs), with SI/LSI designations updated regularly by the European Central Bank (ECB). Significant institutions are directly supervised by the ECB using joint supervisory teams that involve the national competent authorities (NCAs) of individual participating countries. Less significant institutions are supervised by the relevant NCA on a day-to-day basis, under the supervisory oversight of the ECB. In Latvia's case, the NCA is the Bank of Latvia.

== Significant institutions ==
As of 1 September 2025, the ECB had three Latvian banking groups in its list of significant institutions:

- AS Citadele banka
- AS SEB banka, subsidiary of SEB Group
- Swedbank Baltics AS, subsidiary of Swedbank that also serves Estonia and Lithuania

A study published in 2024 assessed that the bank with most aggregate assets in Latvia (as opposed to total consolidated assets) as of end-2023 was Swedbank at €9.3 billion, followed by SEB (€5.6 billion) and Citadele (€4.9 billion). Luminor is also present in Latvia via a branch. No other SIs based in the euro area have subsidiaries in Latvia.

== Less significant institutions ==
As of 1 September 2025, the ECB's list of supervised institutions included eight Latvian LSIs, three of which were designated by the ECB as "high-impact" on the basis of several criteria including size:

- BluOr Bank AS
- AS Rietumu Banka
- Signet Bank AS

The other five Latvian LSIs were:

- AS Reģionālā investīciju banka
- AS Industra Bank
- AS Indexo Banka
- AS Magnetiq Bank, subsidiary of Signet Bank
- Latvian branch of TF Bank

As of October 2025, there were no branches of banks located outside the European Economic Area ("third-country branches" in EU parlance) in Latvia, based on data compiled by the European Banking Authority.

== Credit unions ==
Latvia is one of six euro-area countries with credit unions, together with Croatia, Estonia, Ireland, Lithuania, and the Netherlands. Latvian credit unions (Latvian: krājaizdevu sabiedrības) are small cooperative credit institutions outside the scope of the EU Capital Requirements Directives, and thus regulated and supervised under national law. At end-2024, there were 25 such Latvian credit unions with total assets of ca. €30 million (US$31 million).

== History of licensing ==
English name	Call name	Licence date	Majority Owner	Capital	Website
Akciju sabiedrība "Citadele banka"	Citadele	30 June 2010	Ripplewood Advisors LLC	(United States)	citadele.lv
Magnetiq Bank	Magnetiq Bank	5 September 2008	Signet Bank	(Latvia)	
Akciju sabiedrība "Reģionālā investīciju banka"	RIB	14 September 2001	SKY Investment Holding	(Latvia)	ribbank.com
Akciju sabiedrība "Rietumu Banka"	Rietumu	5 September 2008	Esterkin Family Investments	(Latvia)	rietumu.com
BluOr Bank AS	BluOr Bank AS	12 June 2001	BBG AS	(Latvia)	
AS "Industra Bank"	Industra	6 May 1994	J.A. Investment Holding	(Latvia)	industra.finance
AS "SEB banka"	SEB	29 September 1993	SEB AB	(Sweden)	seb.lv
Baltic International Bank SE	BIB	3 May 1993	Belokon family	(Latvia)	bib.eu
Luminor Bank AS	Luminor	2 January 2019	Luminor Bank	(Estonia)	luminor.lv
Signet Bank AS	Signet Bank	26 May 1992	Signet Acquisition III LLC	(Latvia)	signetbank.com
AS "INDEXO Banka"	INDEXO	2023	INDEXO	(Latvia)	indexo.lv
"Swedbank" AS	Swedbank	7 September 1998	Swedbank AB	(Sweden)	swedbank.lv

== Defunct Banks ==
Several former Latvian banks are documented on Wikipedia, including multiple banks established in the early 1990s that failed only shortly afterwards. They are listed below in chronological order of establishment.

- Latvijas Kredītbanka (1937-1940)
- Latvian Land Bank (1989-1998)
- Trasta Komercbanka (1989-2016)
- Latvijas Krājbanka (1991-2011)
- Rīgas Komercbanka (1991-2018)
- Sakaru Banka (1991-1997)
- Latvian Industrial Bank (1991-1999)
- Riga United Baltic Bank (1991-1997)
- Ako Banka (1992-1996)
- Dālderis Komercbanka (1992-1993)
- Hansabank (1992-2008)
- Latintrādes Banka (1992-1995)
- LTN-Skonto Banka (1992-1995)
- Parex Bank (1992-2010)
- PNB Banka (1992-2019)
- PrivatBank (1992-2022)
- Saules Banka (1992-2001)
- Topbanka (1992-1994)
- VEF Banka (1992-2010)
- ABLV Bank (1993-2018)
- Alejas Komercbanka (1993-1995)
- Baltic International Bank (1993-2022)
- Banka Baltija (1993-1995)
- Banka Sigulda (1993-1994)
- Ogres Komercbanka (1993-2006)
- Talsu Komercbanka (1993-1996)
- Ventspils United Baltic Bank (1993-2000)
- GE Money Bank (2008-2013)
- Reverta (2010-2012)

== See also ==
- List of banks in the euro area
- List of banks in Europe
