= HSBC Bank Russia =

OOO HSBC Bank (RR) Эйч-эс-би-си Банк (РР)
- Type: Subsidiary of HSBC Holdings plc
- Industry: Finance and Insurance
- Founded: 1996
- Defunct: 2024
- Headquarters: Moscow, Russia
- Key people: Gregory Garnier, CEO
- Products: Financial services
- Website: hsbc.ru

OOO HSBC Bank (RR) (Russian: ООО Эйч-эс-би-си Банка (РР); commonly referred to as HSBC Russia) was a subsidiary of HSBC Holdings plc, headquartered in Moscow, Russia. The bank provided personal banking and corporate banking services. In 2024, Expobank acquired HSBC Russia.

== History ==
HSBC established its presence in Russia in 1996, focusing primarily on corporate banking services to support international businesses operating in the country after the dissolution of the Soviet Union.

In 2009, HSBC Russia expanded its operations by launching retail banking services, opening its first retail branch in Russia with the aim of offering a comprehensive range of financial products to individual consumers.

In 2011, HSBC agreed to sell parts of its Russian retail banking business to Citibank as part of plans announced earlier in the year to focus on commercial and wholesale banking in Russia, citing the challenging economic environment and the need to focus on more profitable areas of its business. The bank closed its retail operations, sold four branches in Moscow and one in Saint Petersburg, and reduced its private banking presence to a representative office, while continuing to provide services to corporate clients. The gross asset value of the businesses to be sold was approximately 305.8 million Russian rubles as of March 2011.

In June 2022, amid increasing geopolitical tensions and economic sanctions following the Russian invasion of Ukraine, HSBC declared its intention to sell its Russian business. The bank sought approval from the Government of Russia for the sale, anticipating a projected loss of $300 million US dollars from the exit.

In February 2024, Russian president Vladimir Putin authorized the sale of HSBC's Russian unit to Expobank, a Russian lender owned by entrepreneur Igor Kim. The transaction was completed in May 2024, marking HSBC's full exit from the Russian market after nearly three decades of operation.

In November 2024, HSBC ceased processing all payments from Russia and Belarus for its personal banking customers, aligning with the broader trend of international banks withdrawing from Russia due to financial sanctions imposed after the invasion of Ukraine.

== See also ==
- List of banks in Russia
