= QBF fraud case =

Russian-Cypriot investment scheme

- Court: Presnensky District Court, Moscow
- Full case name: Criminal case No. 12001450007000902
- Decided: 11 March 2025 (ongoing appeals)

Case history
- Subsequent action: Appeals filed March 2025
- Related action: Cyprus District Court Case 525/2022

Holding
- Guilty on all charges (Russian defendants)

Court membership
- Judge sitting: Three-judge panel

Keywords
- Securities fraud, Ponzi scheme, Money laundering, Offshore company

The QBF fraud case (дело КьюБиЭф) was a Ponzi-style investment scheme run through the Moscow-based brokerage QBF between 2012 and 2021. Russian police opened a criminal file in April 2021; five senior managers were jailed for 8–18 years in March 2025, and two organisers remain fugitives. The Central Bank revoked all QBF licences in July 2021, and parallel civil actions are proceeding in Cyprus and Russia.

== Background ==
=== Company operations ===
QBF (originally QB Finance) was founded in 2008 in Moscow by Roman Valerievich Shpakov (Роман Валерьевич Шпаков). The company obtained Russian financial services licenses in 2009 for brokerage, dealer, securities management, and depository activities. QBF joined the National Association of Securities Market Participants (NAUFOR) in 2014 and maintained its headquarters in Moscow City at Presnenskaya Embankment 8, Building 1, occupying several floors in the "City of Capitals" complex. QBF offered discretionary portfolio management services and marketing access to international capital markets with projected annual returns of 15-20%. The company operated through multiple entities, including Russian subsidiaries and Cyprus-based companies. Cyprus operations included QB Capital CY Ltd (company number HE 338967) and other offshore entities in the Cayman Islands, Hong Kong, and Belize.

=== Key personnel ===
According to the verdict, QBF functioned as a three-tier criminal association led by Roman Valerievich Shpakov (Роман Валерьевич Шпаков), who served as founder and overall leader of the criminal association.

- Domestic subdivision – headed by Vladimir Sergeevich Pakhomov (Владимир Сергеевич Пахомов) was responsible for the domestic operations and overseeing client recruitment. Under his supervision were Stanislav Anatolievich Matyukhin (Станислав Анатольевич Матюхин), appointed CEO in 2017 and grandson of former Central Bank Chairman Georgy Matyukhin (1990–1992); Zelimkhan Vladimirovich Munaev (Зелимхан Владимирович Мунаев), co-founder and former head of Cyprus operations; and Alexei Sergeyevich Golubev (Алексей Сергеевич Голубев), head of Saint Petersburg office.
- International subdivision – Linda Athanasiadou (Λίντα Αθανασιάδου) (Линда Атанасиаду), also known by aliases Kovalenko, Torres, and Athanasiades, managed all offshore financial infrastructure and head of the offshore money-laundering hub. She was recruited by Shpakov no later than December 31, 2013, and operated primarily from Cyprus.
- Legal subdivision – managed by Evgenia Anatolievna Rossieva (Евгения Анатольевна Россиева), responsible for façade compliance, document preparation, and coordination with Russian authorities. She joined the criminal association no later than August 31, 2017.

Prior to joining QBF, Matyukhin worked at the Federal Financial Markets Service and the Central Bank of Russia, where he supervised the regulation of investment companies, including QBF, creating a significant conflict of interest.

== Criminal scheme ==
=== Operations period ===
According to court findings, QBF operated a criminal scheme from June 2012 to May 2021. The company attracted investments under the guise of portfolio management but diverted funds to offshore accounts. Clients received fabricated monthly and quarterly reports showing non-existent profits, while withdrawal requests were systematically delayed or denied.

The scheme targeted wealthy individuals, including government officials, military officers, and business executives. Some clients invested amounts reaching 1 billion rubles, though many could not prove the legal origin of their funds and therefore did not officially report their losses.

=== International structure ===
QBF's international operations were structured through multiple offshore jurisdictions, managed by Linda Athanasiadou's international operations division. The criminal organisation operated through a complex network of shell companies designed to obscure money flows and evade regulatory oversight.

The central Cyprus entity QB Capital CY Ltd (company number HE 338967) served as the initial offshore hub, with Zelimkhan Munaev as director until its liquidation in August 2018 following inquiries from Cypriot authorities.

Following the liquidation of QB Capital CY Ltd, the criminal organisation established replacement entities, including White Lake Management Ltd (Cayman Islands), serving as the primary offshore investment vehicle, Simtelligence Company Limited (Hong Kong), handling Asian financial operations, and additional entities in Belize and other jurisdictions.

According to Russian prosecutorial documents, Linda Athanasiadou coordinated money transfers across multiple countries, including Liechtenstein, Kosovo, Armenia, Turkey, South Africa, Cayman Islands, Vanuatu, Comoros, the United States, Poland, and the United Kingdom. The network used nominee representatives and shell companies to disguise the actual ownership and movement of stolen funds.

== Investigation and prosecution ==
=== Criminal case ===
The Russian Ministry of Internal Affairs opened criminal case number 12001450007000902 in April 2021. On 25–26 May 2021, law enforcement conducted searches at over 30 locations in Moscow and Saint Petersburg, including QBF's headquarters and regional offices.

Charges were filed under Russian Criminal Code Article 159, Part 4 (fraud by organised group) and Article 210 (criminal organisation).

=== Convicted individuals ===
QBF Fraud Case – criminal sentences (2023–2025)
Name	Role	Sentence	Regime	Date	Notes
Zelimkhan Munaev (Зелимхан Мунаев)	Co-founder; ex-Cyprus head	8 years	General	21 Sep 2023	Pleaded guilty; 239 volumes of testimony
Vladimir Pakhomov (Владимир Пахомов)	Branch-network director	18 years	Strict	11 Mar 2025	Maximum term
Stanislav Matyukhin (Станислав Матюхин)	CEO	17 years	Strict	11 Mar 2025	Grandson of former CBR chairman
Evgenia Rossieva (Евгения Россиева)	Head of legal	15 years	General	11 Mar 2025	Held 2½ years pre-trial
Alexei Golubev (Алексей Голубев)	St Petersburg head	13 years	General	11 Mar 2025	Minimum among 2025 defendants
Total		71 years			

The prosecution had requested sentences ranging from 14 to 20 years for the March 2025 defendants. None of the defendants except Munaev acknowledged guilt.

=== Fugitive individuals ===
Two key figures remain at large with active international warrants:

QBF Fraud Case Fugitives
Name	Role	Status	Location	Interpol Status	Notes
Roman Shpakov (Роман Шпаков)	Founder and criminal association leader	International fugitive	UAE (fled January 2021), reportedly London	Red Notice since October 2021	Primary scheme organizer
Linda Athanasiadou (Λίντα Αθανασιάδου) (Линда Атанасиаду)	Head of international operations	International fugitive	Unknown	Wanted internationally	Cyprus citizen, former KPMG employee

According to Russian prosecutorial documents, both fugitives face charges under Criminal Code Article 210, Part 3 (criminal organisation leadership) and Article 159, Part 4 (large-scale fraud).

Criminal proceedings against both fugitives continue as separate cases.

=== Arrest details ===
The first arrests occurred in May 2021 following searches at over 30 locations in Moscow and Saint Petersburg conducted by law enforcement officers from multiple agencies, including the Main Directorate for Ecology and Crime Control of the Ministry of Internal Affairs, supported by special forces.

Zelimkhan Munaev barricaded himself in his apartment on Nikolaeva Street for three hours before surrendering to authorities. The door had to be broken down after anti-removal pins jammed, preventing Munaev from opening it from inside.

Evgenia Rossieva was arrested without incident at her residence on Udaltsova Street. During searches at QBF's headquarters in the "City of Capitals" complex, investigators found documentation and electronic media, including a memo for managers advising how to behave during law enforcement visits.

== Regulatory response ==
=== Central Bank of Russia ===
The Central Bank of Russia suspended QBF operations on 3 June 2021, citing regulatory violations. All company licenses were revoked on 8 July 2021. Temporary administration was appointed on 21 September 2021, with bankruptcy proceedings initiated in 2024.

=== Cyprus Securities and Exchange Commission ===
CySEC imposed administrative penalties on QBF-related entities, Pruden Ventures Capital Ltd (formerly QBF Investment Ltd and Constance Investment Ltd), totaling €25,900 between 2023-2024, contrasting with estimated investor losses of €70-100 million.

== Victim impact ==
=== Scale of losses ===
Russian court documents identify over 2,000 individuals who filed complaints regarding QBF investments. Verified claims in bankruptcy proceedings total ₽ 2.048 billion from 151 creditors, while total estimated losses range from ₽ 5 billion to ₽ 7 billion. Approximately 500 individuals were officially recognised as victims in the criminal proceedings.

=== Notable cases ===
Ballerina Anastasia Volochkova invested ₽ 3 million in 2020, with ₽ 1.7 million remaining unrecovered. Court proceedings revealed that QBF management initially returned ₽ 500,000 to Volochkova, hoping she would use her connections to help unfreeze company accounts. The Borzenkov family, including former Yekaterinburg Deputy Mayor Ilya Borzenkov, transferred ₽ 974 million to QBF between 2016-2018.

== Current status ==
As of 2025, bankruptcy proceedings continue under Central Bank supervision. Civil litigation remains active in multiple jurisdictions. The criminal case against fugitive defendants Roman Shpakov and Linda Athanasiadou continues as separate proceedings.

== See also ==
- Ponzi scheme
- MMM (Ponzi scheme company)
- Russian Laundromat
- Pyramid scheme
- National Association of Securities Market Participants
