= Sofocleous =

Sofocleous is a surname. Notable people with the surname include:

- Andreas Sofocleous (born 1967), Cypriot lawyer
- Margarita Sofocleous (born 1986), Cypriot footballer
