= Maria Albot =

Moldovan jurist and politician

Member of the Moldovan Parliament
- In office 9 March 2019 – 31 July 2019
- Succeeded by: Igor Himici
- Parliamentary group: Șor Party

Personal details
- Born: 21 January 1986 (age 40)
- Education: Moldova State University

Maria Albot (born Guțuleac, 21 January 1986) is a Moldovan jurist and politician, a former deputy in the 21st legislature of the Parliament of the Republic of Moldova, elected on the lists of the Șor Party.

== Childhood and education ==
Maria Albot studied at the Logica High School in Chișinău, in a class with Ilan Șor, the son of the founder of the high school. Her party colleague Marina Tauber also studied at the same school. She studied law at the State University of Moldova, graduating in 2009. In 2013 she became a master of law at the Free International University of Moldova.

== Career ==
She worked for a long time at Primex Com SRL, as a printing center operator in 2002-2009, a legal advisor in 2009-2012, and head of the legal department and secretariat in 2012-2014. After completing her undergraduate studies, she began working in companies managed by Ilan Șor and people from his entourage, in 2011 being presented by the press as Șor's assistant. Thus, in 2010-2012 she was a legal advisor at Dufremol SRL, becoming the company's commercial director in 2014, and in 2018 the sister company DFM SRL.

Since August 2015, for one year, she was the head of the Pentru Orhei public association, remaining a member of the association's board of directors. She is active within the Miron Shor charity foundation, where she is or was vice-president.

== Political activity ==
Albot became secretary general of the ȘOR Party in April 2017, a few months after the reshuffle in the party following the takeover of the Ravnopravie Movement.

In the 2019 parliamentary elections, she competed on the national party list and became a deputy in parliament. She resigned her mandate on 31 July 2019, stating that she wanted to return to charity activities within the "Miron Shor" Foundation. Her place was taken by lawyer Igor Himici, a member of the same party.

Albot is included in the European Union (EU)'s list of Moldovan individuals and entities sanctioned for destabilizing, threatening or undermining Moldova's independence and sovereignty due to her close connections with Shor. As a result, Albot and the other sanctioned individuals and entities would not be able to enter or transit through EU member states, and they would be subject to an asset freeze and to a ban on receiving funds or economic resources directly or indirectly.

== Controversies ==
According to RISE Moldova, Maria Albot's name appeared in the report of the international audit company Kroll, made by analyzing the circumstances of the 2014 Moldovan bank fraud scandal. The report stated that Albot owned a 4.98% stake in Banca Socială, one of the three banks involved in the 13.7 billion lei bank fraud. The lawyer's husband, Sergiu Albot, was the head of Banca Socială, and in this capacity was sanctioned in 2016 by the National Bank of Moldova for improperly evaluating loans granted. Previously, he had also been vice president of Unibank, another banking institution involved in the theft.

In 2015, Maria Albot's name was mentioned in the self-denunciation filed by Ilan Șor against former Prime Minister Vladimir Filat, in which Șor stated that she was tasked with transferring money or paying for services to Filat. In 2016, Albot was heard in the Filat case as a prosecution witness, confirming the allegations in the self-denunciation.

== Personal life ==
Maria Albot is married and has 2 children. Her husband is banker Sergiu Albot, former head of Banca Sociala. She resides in Chișinău. She speaks Russian, Romanian and English.
