= 2014 Moldovan bank fraud scandal =

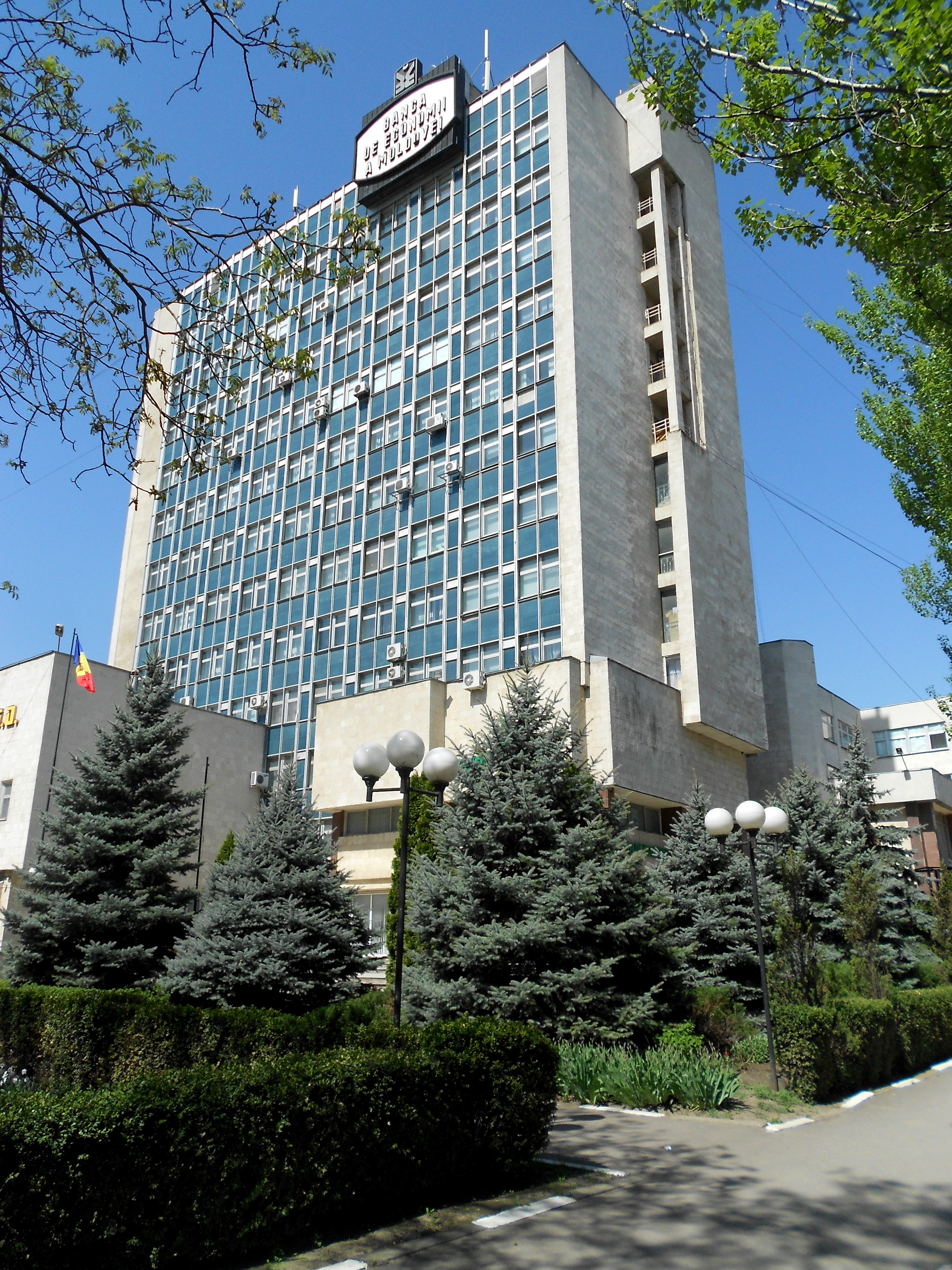
- Banca de Economii was a state-owned Moldovan bank involved in the fraudulent money laundering scheme
- Location: Moldova, Latvia, UK
- Type: white-collar crime, banking fraud, money laundering
- Participants: Vlad Filat, Ilan Șor, Vlad Plahotniuc, Serghei Iaralov, Nicolae Timofti, Iurie Leancă, Stéphane Christophe Bridé, Mircea Buga, Oleg Reidman

In 2014, $1 billion disappeared from three Moldovan banks: Banca de Economii, Unibank and Banca Socială. This bank fraud was a coordinated effort involving all three banks working together to extract as much loan finance as possible from the banks without any obvious business rationale. Ilan Șor, a Moldovan businessman, together with Vladimir Plahotniuc and Serghei Iaralov "masterminded" the scam. Șor was chairman of the board at Banca de Economii (Savings Bank, BEM) up to 28 November 2014.

Funds worth $1 billion were transferred to the United Kingdom and Hong Kong shell companies used to conceal the real owners of assets, then deposited into Latvian bank accounts under the names of various foreigners.

The total loss from the scheme was equivalent to 12% of Moldova's GDP.

A carousel borrowing scheme was applied, loans at one bank were paid off with loans from another. The massive expansion of bank lending was funded with heavy borrowing from Russian companies.

During the parliamentary hearings on the bank fraud, the Moldovan Information and Security Service deputy director, Vadim Vrabie, declared that President Nicolae Timofti had known since 2013 about the robbery at Banca de Economii, Banca Socială and Unibank.

== Prior to 2012 ==
In 2007–2009 the Banca de Economii (Savings Bank) expanded their lending activities, with a significant number of the credits given at the time being not reimbursed later in 2011. In June 2012, the Moldovan Anticorruption Center was requested to investigate the involvement of institutions registered in Moldova in money laundering schemes on regional and international level, following the Sergei Magnitsky cause célèbre.

== August 2012–November 2014 ==
During this period, the three banks were subject to significant shareholder change. Commencing August 2012, ownership of Unibank was transferred to nominees as well as political figures and individuals close to Șor. In 2013 Șor bought into the ownership of Banca de Economii.

In order to facilitate an increase in lending to Moldovan entities, the banks apparently coordinated to increase the available liquidity. The money from the State Health Insurance Company was also used. In June 2012, the State Health Insurance Company, headed by Mircea Buga, deposited MDL 140 million, approximately €9 million, in the accounts of Unibank. The State Health Insurance Company was not able to withdraw the deposits of MDL 115 million, or €7.4 million, from Unibank until January 2015. The fact caused an MDL 102 million, or €5.3 million debt to the hospitals and an acute shortage of medications in the winter of 2014–2015.

The banks expanded their lending massively, far more than their capital reserves should have allowed. According to a report from the International Monetary Fund, the normative capital of the Banca de Economii (Savings Bank) decreased ten-fold in 2012, whereas the share of overdue credits increased by about 1 billion lei, approximately €191.2 million. The market value of its shares depreciated from 30 to 14 lei in a year.

The three banks involved in fraudulent activities were audited by the Grant Thornton office in Moldova, affiliated to the global Grant Thornton in 2010, 2011, and 2013. None of the reports indicated any problems in the banks' activities. One of the company's partners is Olesea Bride, who is married to Stéphane Christophe Bridé, Moldovan minister of economy, and former managing partner of Grant Thornton Romania–Moldova.

Communist deputy Oleg Reidman, former economic adviser to President Vladimir Voronin, is rumoured to be one of the key figures in bank fraud and subsequent money laundering, according to the report „Offshore Republic”, made public in 2022 by the Independent Anti-Corruption Advisory Committee (ICC). The report reads: "Reidman supported a legislative agenda that facilitated the entry of financial flows into Moldova in the mid-2000s, and in 2013 he headed a special parliamentary commission that recommended the additional issuance of shares to BEM as a solution to the problems of capitalization, which subsequently, he allowed Șor to gain control of the bank".

== November 2014 ==
In the week preceding the 2014 Moldovan parliamentary election more than $750 million were extracted from the three banks in just three days, between November 24 and 26. A van belonging to Klassica Force, a company owned by Șor, while transporting 12 sacks of bank files, was stolen and burned on November 27. Records of many transactions were deleted from the banks' computers. On November 26, 2014, the banks went bankrupt and were later placed under special administration of the National Bank of Moldova. On November 27, the Moldovan Government, headed by Prime Minister Iurie Leancă, secretly decided to bail out the three banks with $870 million in emergency loans, covered by state reserves. This created a deficit in Moldovan public finances equivalent to an eighth of the country's GDP.

== Kroll Report ==
On January 28, 2015, the National Bank of Moldova hired the U.S. investigative consultancy Kroll to conduct an investigation of the fraud known as Project Tenor.

The auditors reviewed transactions at the three banks with missing funds in November 2014. The report documents how companies tied to Șor gradually took control of the banks and then allegedly issued massive loans to affiliated companies. It concluded the three banks transferred at least 13.5 billion lei to five Moldovan companies affiliated with the Shor group, controlled by Șor, between November 24 and 26.

== Involvement of Moldovan banks ==
Moldovan banks have long been notorious for being involved in the region's largest money laundering schemes, known as the Russian Laundromat going far beyond the 2014 theft of $1 billion. Russian and Ukrainian state officials, regional organized crime groups, and regional businesses have long used Moldovan banks to launder tens of billions of dollars and move them into Europe. Between 2010 and early 2014, organized criminals and corrupt politicians in Russia moved US$20 billion in dirty funds through offshore companies, banks, fake loans, and proxy agents. The process was certified as clean by judges in the Republic of Moldova and money was spread across Europe.

== Involvement of Latvian banks ==
A number of Latvian banks were involved in the scam. The Latvian banks named in the report are ABLV Bank, PrivatBank and Latvijas Pasta Banka.

Two senior Latvian politicians, Ainars Latkovskis (head of the Saeima's Defense, Internal Affairs and Anti-Corruption Committee) and Solvita Āboltiņa (head of the National Security Committee) were summoned to the US in the fall of 2015 and told in no uncertain terms by officials at the State Department and Treasury that Latvia needed to clean up its act.

In November 2015 the Latvian banking regulator passed the harshest sentence on money laundering yet: a 2,016,830 euro fine for Privatbank, dismissal of its CEO and the responsible board member, as well as individual fines for board members. Investigations of Pasta Bank and ABLV Bank are still ongoing.

ABLV Bank and PrivatBank were among the six banks named by the Latvian authorities in July 2012 to have received funds directly or indirectly from the $230 million illegal tax refund exposed by the late Sergei Magnitsky.

== Political implications in Moldova ==
The scandal is politically sensitive as it involved prominent politicians and business people, including Vlad Filat, the former Prime Minister of Moldova and founder of the pro-European Liberal Democratic Party of Moldova. The $1 billion bank fraud has compromised the pro-European Government and contributed to the declining popularity of the EU among Moldovans. An April 2015 poll found that 32% of Moldovans favoured joining the EU, a decrease of 46 percent compared to 78% in 2007.

In March 2015, Emma Tabarta, the vice governor of the National Bank, as well as Artur Gherman, president of the National Commission for Financial Markets, were dismissed. The decision was taken in Parliament, behind closed doors, in a meeting that lasted more than eight hours. Moldova's central bank governor Dorin Drăguțanu resigned in September 2015, accusing politicians of interfering in the investigation of the fraud. Valeriu Streleț government was dismissed by Parliament in October 2015, after less than three months in office.

As a response to the $1 billion disappearance the grass-roots citizens' movement Dignity and Truth (Romanian: Demnitate și Adevăr) was established in February 2015. The movement organized a series of street demonstrations, flash mobs, sit-ins, and pickets, known as the 2015 Moldovan protests.

The protests organized by the Dignity and Truth movement were joined by the pro-Russian sympathizers, who formed a distinct camp. Both camps demand the conviction of corrupt oligarchs and early elections.

== Political implications in Latvia ==
Kristaps Zakulis, who for four years had headed Latvia's financial regulator the Financial and Capital Markets Commissions (FKTK), handed in his resignation amid mounting criticism that he was not tough enough on money laundering in the country's boutique banking sector in January 2016.

== Criminal prosecutions ==
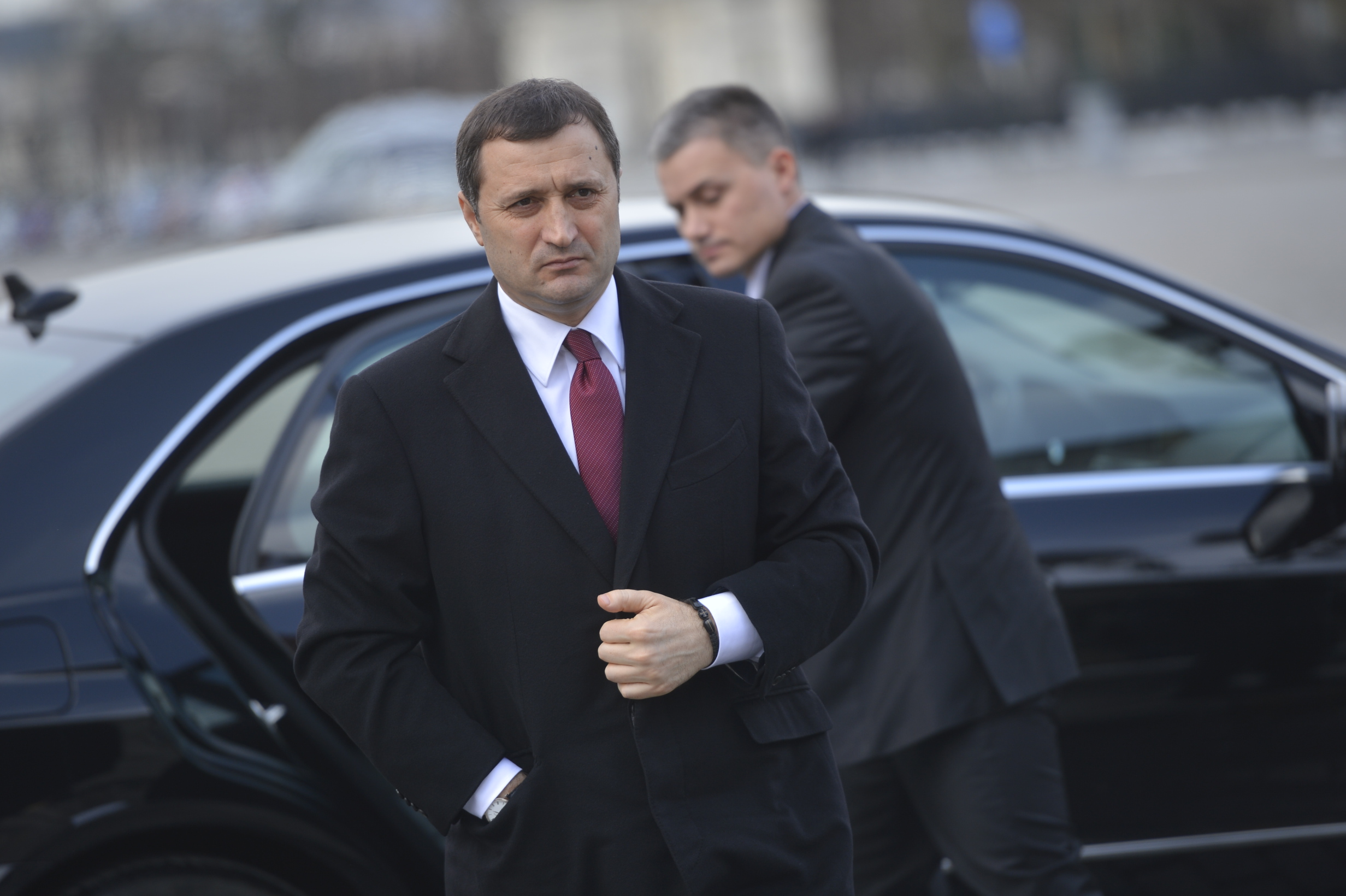
Former Prime Minister Vlad Filat, was arrested on 15 October 2015 for involvement in the bank fraud scandal.

As of late October 2015, at least 44 criminal cases regarding non-performing loans allowed by the three banks had been initiated and 20 of them are currently being reviewed.

Șor was placed under house arrest on 6 May 2015 and has been charged with "abuse of office while managing a bank." However, it did not prevent him from running for the public office of the mayor of Orhei in June 2015. In February 2019 Șor was elected member of the parliament.

Vlad Filat was stripped of his immunity and handcuffed in parliament on 15 October 2015. On 18 October 2015 Filat was placed in preliminary detention for 30 days, the detention period being extended for 30 more days on 11 November. On 22 October 2015, Denis Urechi, the manager of ProAcvaCom, was found guilty of submitting to Banca de Economii (Savings Bank) faked land assessments to obtain a loan equaling US$1.9 million back in October 2011.

Ion Rusu, the manager of Caravita Co. Business Estate Investments was sentenced to five years of imprisonment for using the companies to launder funds and commit fraud. Rusu confessed that he made fictitious transactions with the intent to hide the origin of US$3.12 million stolen from the Moldovan Savings Bank.

Rusu is brother-in-law to Vlad Filat, former Prime Minister of Moldova, and has claimed Filat is the real owner of the two companies.

A court in Chisinau on June 27 found Vlad Filat guilty of abuse of office and corruption. He was sentenced to nine years in jail on corruption charges, stripped of a state award, and barred from holding public office for five years.

Veaceslav Platon, a former member of the Parliament of Moldova, was extradited to Chișinău from Ukraine in August 2016 after Moldovan prosecutors charged him with participating in a scheme to defraud Moldovan banks of US$1 billion. He is charged with stealing more than $40 million from Banca de Economii.

In September 2016, 15 former or acting judges and 3 court bailiffs were arrested by the officers of the National Anti-corruption Center, being accused of being involved in the Russian Laundromat scheme. One judge and one bailiff were searched at their homes.

In January 2022, the IMF stated that measures taken by the authorities between 2016 and 2020 under the ECF/EFF arrangements had "supported the rehabilitation of the banking sector and restored macrofinancial stability" following the 2014 Moldovan bank fraud scandal.

On 21 December 2023, the Moldovan parliament voted 81 to 101 in favour of dismissing Octavian Armașu as governor of the National Bank of Moldova due to the scandal. Members of the Socialist Party joined President Maia Sandu's pro-European Action and Solidarity Party to secure a two-thirds vote. He was succeeded by Anca Dragu, a Romanian politician. In a June 2024 report, the European Commission described Armașu's dismissal as sudden and unexpected, stating that "the procedure by which the former governor was dismissed is a cause for concern and may pose a risk to the independence of the central bank". The decision was also scrutinised by the IMF, referring to the decision as abrupt and course for concern about the independence of the NBM.

== Reactions ==
(European Union) Petras Auštrevicius, MEP, commented on the confidence crisis affecting Moldova: "To steal a billion dollars! ... You need plenty of bags to move that money around ... I hope that the name of the persons involved will be made public. ... Corruption in Moldova is a political disease, a disease that became systemic and that affects all levels of power ... it is eroding the country from the inside".

Pirkka Tapiola, the European Union's ambassador to Moldova, said at a news conference in Chisinau: "I do not have an answer for you on how it is possible to steal so much money from a small country."

Congresswoman Sheila Jackson Lee said: "I call upon the Administration and the Congress to investigate whether assets of the national banks of countries of the former Soviet Union are not being plundered and used, knowingly or unknowingly, to benefit terrorist organizations."

Romania offered Moldova emergency economic aid and a loan of $65 million. Romanian Prime Minister Dacian Cioloș said that to get the money, Moldova will have to reform its justice system, fight corruption, sign a draft agreement for a loan from the International Monetary Fund, and appoint a new central bank governor.

In response to the $1 billion bank fraud, the EU, International Monetary Fund and World Bank have frozen their financial assistance to Moldova.

== See also ==
- Azerbaijani Laundromat
- Danske Bank money laundering scandal
- Russian Laundromat
