= SEB Pank =

Company based in Estonia

AS SEB Pank

- A main building of SEB Pank
- Formerly: Eesti Ühispank; SEB Eesti Ühispank
- Industry: Financial services
- Founded: 15 December 1992; 33 years ago
- Headquarters: Tallinn, Estonia
- Area served: Estonia
- Services: Retail banking, merchant banking, wealth management, life insurance, pensions
- Net income: €67.90 mln (2014)
- Total assets: €4837.71 mln (2014)
- Total equity: €677.26 mln (2014)
- Parent: SEB Group
- Website: www.seb.ee

SEB Pank is an Estonian bank, owned by the Swedish bank SEB. SEB is the second largest bank in Estonia and is a member of the international SEB Group. Until 11 April 2005 the name of the bank was Eesti Ühispank, which was originally founded in 1992 from a merger of 10 smaller banks. On 7 March 2008, the bank changed its name to SEB Pank.

SEB is a universal bank focused on the Estonian market, offering full financial services to large, small and medium-sized companies, the public sector and private individuals. As of the end of 2004 SEB Eesti Ühispank had 629,000 customers, from which 580,000 were private individuals and 49,000 legal persons. The number of Internet banking customers in 2005 exceeded the milestone of 340,000. At the end of 2003, SEB Eesti Ühispank had 1,328 employees.

SEB Pank has been designated as a Significant Institution since the entry into force of European Banking Supervision in late 2014, and as a consequence is directly supervised by the European Central Bank.

== See also ==
- SEB
- SEB banka (Latvia)
- SEB bankas (Lithuania)
- List of banks in Estonia
- List of banks in the euro area
