= Russian Laundromat =

Money-laundering scheme from Russia

The Russian Laundromat was a scheme to move $20–80 billion out of Russia from 2010 to 2014 through a network of global banks, many of them in Moldova and Latvia. The Guardian reported that around 500 people were suspected of being involved, many of whom were wealthy Russians. The money laundering scheme was uncovered by Global Laundromat, an investigation. The New Yorker says that that operation was known as "The Russian Laundromat," "The Global Laundromat," or "The Moldovan Scheme." The Herald wrote that the scheme is "thought to be the world's biggest and most elaborate money-laundering scheme."

== Novaya Gazeta news investigation ==
Internal bank documents detailing around 70,000 transactions between 2011 and 2014 were obtained by the Russian newspaper Novaya Gazeta and the Organized Crime and Corruption Reporting Project (OCCRP), which then shared data from the documents with various media companies in March 2017. The term "Russian Laundromat" was coined by the OCCRP. The analyzed documents contained the details of approximately 70,000 banking transactions, according to Bloomberg, with 1,920 firms in the UK and 373 in the US involved. The alleged architect of the scheme is Veaceslav Platon, a Moldovan businessman and former MP. Platon is one of the wealthiest people in Moldova, with businesses in the field of sugar and banking in Moldova, and atomic energy in Ukraine. In 1994, Platon became vice-president of the administrative board of the Moldovan private bank Moldindconbank and later became vice-president of the board of another Moldovan bank, Investprivatbank. Moldindconbank is the more important of the two: it was established on 1 January 1959 as a branch of the Construction Bank of the USSR to primarily finance Moldovan industries and construction businesses but was reorganised when the Soviet Union fell; as of 2022 it is the second largest bank in Moldova by asset value. In 1998, Platon entered politics as a member of the Municipal Council of Chișinău on the lists of the electoral bloc of agrarians. Igor Putin (Vladimir Putin's cousin) has also been named in connection with this scheme. The scheme allowed Russia's elite to funnel out at least $20 billion from Russia.

== Laundered money by region ==
=== Global banks and other ===
The investigation revealed that $20.8 billion had been laundered in 96 countries. According to money laundering experts, the money was moved initially to a network of 21 shell companies in the UK, Cyprus, and New Zealand, after which further payments went to wider group of companies, many of which were fictitious.

Eleven companies registered in the UAE were named in the investigation as possible shell companies filtering the laundered money, and the data said that the UAE registered companies total received $434,076,385.

Global banks that touched the laundered money included Deutsche Bank, Standard Chartered, and Barclays.

=== British territories ===
Afterwards, it was reported that $740 million had been processed by British banks as part of the scheme. On 20 March 2017 the British paper The Guardian reported that hundreds of banks had helped launder KGB-related funds out of Russia, as uncovered by the investigation named Global Laundromat. Among the banks facing scrutiny under the investigation were HSBC, the Royal Bank of Scotland, NatWest, Lloyds, Barclays and Coutts. HSBC was listed among the 17 banks in the UK that were "facing questions over what they knew about the international scheme and why they did not turn away suspicious money transfers", as HSBC "processed $545.3m in Laundromat cash, mostly routed through its Hong Kong branch". The Royal Bank of Scotland "handled $113.1 million" in Laundromat cash. Coutts, owned by RBS, had "accepted $32.8m worth of payments via its office in Zurich, Switzerland.” NatWest, also owned by RBS, was named for allowing through $1.1million in related funds. The Guardian reported that around 500 people were suspected of being involved, many of whom were wealthy Russians.

On 27 March 2017, The Herald in Scotland reported that Scottish shell companies were used as part of the scheme, estimated at $5 billion. The newspaper said that one means to circumvent capital export controls was for a Western company to make a fake loan to a Russian company. The Russian company would intentionally default on the loan, and a corrupt court in Moldova would order the company to pay the "debt".

The Guardian wrote that most of the companies involved in laundering the money had UK registration and over half of the money went to shell companies in Scotland, Birmingham, and London. Of those core companies, the data read that Seabon Lt. handled $9 billion through a network of companies. Involved parties included Chadborg Trade LLP, a British shell company, and Tronlux Ventures LLP, also a British shell company.

By June 2017 the UK watchdog, the Financial Conduct Authority, had demanded information from HSBC and the Royal Bank of Scotland concerning the Russian Laundromat.

=== United States ===
Citibank was listed among the American banks who were named as having handled the laundered funds, with banks in the US processing around $63.7 million between 2010 and 2014. Citibank was listed as having processed $37 million of that amount, with others including the Bank of America, which processed $14 million. Others included JP Morgan and Wells Fargo in the United States.

=== Central Asia ===
More than $6 billion was fraudulently moved, laundered or embezzled from Kazakhstan's BTA Bank by its former chairman and CEO Mukhtar Ablyazov.

== Responses from banks and Russia ==
In response to the reports, HSBC stated that it was against financial crime and that the case "highlights the need for greater information sharing between the public and private sectors". Citibank and Standard Chartered responded with statements against the activities, while Wells Fargo, Deutsche Bank, Bank of America, and JP Morgan initially declined to comment to the press.

Several Latvian banks were named as participants in this scheme. Among those Trasta Komercbanka with more than $3.2 billion deposited from the scheme. In 2016 its license was revoked by European Central Bank. Another Latvian bank Baltikums was fined 1.2 million euros by the Latvian Financial and Capital Market Commission (FKTK).

Under the direction of CEO Dmitrijs Latiševs, it was renamed as BlueOrange and reoriented towards domestic customers and the European market.

It substituted current accounts from "high-risk countries" with deposits from individuals from Western Europe.

In total 9 Latvian banks have received deposits associated with this case.

Moldova filed an official complaint to Russia about the laundering on 9 March 2017, and by 23 March, had not received a formal response. On 24 March 2017, Moldova said that Russia was stonewalling and sabotaging its probe into the Russian Laundromat, by seeking to "humiliate and abuse officials visiting or passing through Russia" who were Moldovan. In turn, Russia said its own officials had been harassed, and that they were ready for "constructive cooperation" on the issue.

== Legal cases ==
Platon was arrested in July 2016 in Kyiv and subsequently extradited to the Republic of Moldova. On 20 April 2017, he was sentenced to 18 years in jail. However, then he was released, re-tried, and on 14 June 2021 was acquitted. On 19 July 2021 he flew from Chișinău to London, and from there he flew to Prague.

== See also ==
- Azerbaijani Laundromat
- Danske Bank money laundering scandal
- 2014 Moldovan bank fraud scandal
- Russian interference in European politics
- QBF fraud case – Russian investment fraud (2011–2021) using Cyprus operations. Contemporary schemes like QBF Investment Company demonstrate continued Russian use of offshore structures for financial crimes.
