= PNB Banka =

Latvian commercial bank

JSC PNB Banka
- Founded: 29 April 1992
- Fate: Ceased operation 15 August 2019
- Headquarters: Latvia, Riga
- Area served: Europe, CIS
- Products: Financial services, insurance
- Net income: −244,908 euro (2023)
- Total assets: ▲€996.39 mln (2014)
- Total equity: ▲€100.96 mln (2014)
- Number of employees: ▲604
- Website: www.pnbbanka.eu

PNB Banka (previously Norvik Banka) was one of the oldest commercial banks in Latvia. The bank was established on 29 April 1992 and the majority of the firm was owned by Russian businessman Grigory Guselnikov.

== History ==
The bank had a network of branches and sales points in Latvia, however was not able to follow prudential requirements and was recognized as a "bank likely to fail" by ECB on 15 August 2019. Latvian Regulator took sufficient actions and stopped all the transactions, in order to prevent fund flow outside the bank. PNB Banka was the 6th largest bank in Latvia by assets. The bank provided an array of various banking services to a wide range of customers from natural persons to international industrial enterprises.

In October 2014 the bank's shareholders invested in Norvik Banka's equity capital 69.638 million euros. On 16 October 2014 it was announced that Norvik Banka bought 97.75% stake in Russia's Vyatka Bank. The deal was approved by both the Financial and Capital Market Commission of Latvia and the Central Bank of Russia. Vyatka Bank is a universal regional commercial bank with representative offices in four Russian regions. Vyatka Bank focuses mainly on servicing of private persons and is a stable leader by all the most important bank performance indicators in Kirov Region.

At the beginning of 2014 the Norvik Group employed 1002 persons (Norvik Banka – 604 employees), while at the end of 2014 the number of employees within the Norvik Group reached 1640 persons (Norvik Banka – 606 employees).

At the beginning of 2018, Russian businessman Grigory Guselnikov and his family acquired direct control over Vyatka Bank without mediation from Norvik Banka. On 9 November 2018, the bank changed its name to PNB Banka as the next stage of development.

== Shareholders ==
In 2014, the leading partner of the London-based investment fund G2 Capital Partners Grigory Guselnikov became the majority shareholder of Norvik Banka.

The Chairman of the Board of PNB Banka was Oliver Bramwell. He resigned on 30 June 2019.

== Bank performance ==
The data of the Association of Commercial Banks of Latvia show that by the end of 2014 Norvik Banka had serviced more than 86.5 thousand active customers and by that indicator the bank was ranked 5th in the industry. The bank's assets reached 996.4 million euros by the end of 2014: owing to the increase in the customer base by 19% or 139.5 million euros and the attraction of additional capital from the shareholder in the amount of 69.6 million euros, within a year's time the bank's assets grew by 26% or 203.5 million euros.

The bank's capital adequacy ratio as of the end of the year was 15.19%, which was well over 10.76% a year ago. The bank's liquidity ratio reached 58.75% thus exceeding the indicator as of the end of the previous year – 55.38%. The bank's assets in June 2018 amounted to 618.7 million euros.

== See also ==
- List of banks in Latvia
