= BluOr Bank AS =

Latvian bank

- Company type: Corporation
- Industry: Finance
- Founded: June 22, 2001
- Headquarters: Riga, Latvia
- Net income: €17.9 million (2024)
- Total assets: €1.049 billion (2024)
- Number of employees: 260 (as of October 2025)
- Website: https://www.bluorbank.lv/

BluOr Bank AS (former names: BlueOrange Bank, Baltikums Bank, Baltikums) is a Latvian bank founded in 2001. The central office is located in Riga.

== Overview ==
As of October 2025, BluOr Bank employs approximately 260 people. According to the audited financial report for 2024, the bank’s total assets amounted to €1.049 billion, with equity of €122.4 million and a net income of €17.9 million. The liquidity ratio was 156.28 %, return on equity (ROE) – 20.03 %, and return on assets (ROA) – 1.83 %.

BluOr Bank is included among Latvia’s 500 largest companies and ranks within the top six banks in the country by total assets. It is also listed among Latvia’s 101 most valuable companies, ranking 69th in 2025, up from 89th the previous year.

== History ==
The bank was founded on June 22, 2001, as a joint-stock commercial bank "Baltikums". In September 2017, the bank also changed its legal name to BlueOrange Bank. In summer 2017, the bank financed the opening of a new educational recreation area in Riga.

In February 2018, BlueOrange installed the first contactless card ATMs in Latvia. In May 2018, BlueOrange became the first online bank in Latvia. In December 2021, according to the FKTK Council's 21.12.2021 decision, the bank is ranked among five systemically important financial institutions in Latvia.

On March 21, 2022, the bank was renamed BluOr Bank AS.

== See also ==
- Russian Laundromat – Money-laundering scheme from Russia
- List of banks in the euro area
- List of banks in Latvia
