= SEB banka =

Latvian subsidiary of Skandinaviska Enskilda Banken

SEB banka AS
- Formerly: Latvijas Unibanka; SEB Latvijas Unibanka
- Type: Subsidiary
- Founded: 1993; 33 years ago
- Headquarters: Valdlauči, Latvia
- Net income: €24.76 mln (2014)
- Total assets: €3587.86 mln (2014)
- Total equity: €435.07 mln (2014)
- Owner: SEB Group (100%)
- Number of employees: 871 (2023)
- Website: https://seb.lv

SEB banka (formerly Latvijas Unibanka, then SEB Latvijas Unibanka) is one of the largest banks in Latvia and a part of the Swedish SEB Group. Nowadays, its main rivals in the Latvian banking market are Swedbank, Luminor and Citadele bank.

SEB banka has been designated as a Significant Institution since the entry into force of European Banking Supervision in late 2014, and as a consequence is directly supervised by the European Central Bank.

== History ==
The bank was first founded on 29 September 1993 as AS Latvijas Universālā banka ('Universal Bank of Latvia') by combining 21 of the non-privatized branches of the Bank of Latvia after its reorganization. In 1994 it was handed over to the Privatization Agency of Latvia, but in 1995 it was registered as a private joint-stock company (half of the shares belonged to private capital, half - to the Latvian state), and on 12 December 1995 changed its name to Latvijas Unibanka.

In 1996, the shares of Latvijas Unibanka began to be listed on the official list of the Riga Stock Exchange and were acquired by the European Bank for Reconstruction and Development and Swedfund International AB.

During the Russian economic crisis in 1998, Latvijas Unibanka started cooperation with Skandinaviska Enskilda Banken, which became a shareholder on January 5, 1999. By 2000, SEB had become the majority shareholder and launched a bid to grow its share to 98%. In February 2001, Unibanka stopped listing its shares in the Riga Stock Exchange. SEB became the only shareholder in 2004, and on 11 April 2005, it was renamed to SEB Unibanka, and on 7 April 2008 to SEB banka. Until 2008, the bank's branches were named with a 'Uni-' prefix (e.g. Unilīzings for leasing) and its logo was a stylized Möbius strip.

The first headquarters of the bank were located in Pils iela 23 along the Doma Square in Vecrīga, before moving to a new building (SEB finanšu centrs, SEB Financial Center) in Valdlauči, Ķekava Parish, Ķekava Municipality just outside the borders of Riga in 2004. But in September 2025, after 21 years, headquarters moved back to Riga, this time moving to a new building in Center, Elizabetes iela 95 (Satekles Biznesa centrs).

In 2022, the bank began to scale down its operations in Russia and donated EUR 200,000 to support the Ukrainian people.

== Operation ==
The Management Board of SEB Latvia consists of six people: Chairman of the Management Board Ieva Tetere, Head of Large Corporate Banking Ints Krasts, Head of Retail and SME Banking Arnis Škapars, the Board member responsible for AML and Compliance Māris Larionovs, the Board member responsible for Credit and Risk control Kārlis Danēvičs and Chief Financial Officer Jeļena Cīrule.

== Patron of the University of Latvia ==
SEB banka is a silver patron of the University of Latvia Foundation. SEB has supported the University of Latvia since 2008 by donating to scholarships and forums.

== See also ==
- SEB Pank (Estonia)
- SEB bankas (Lithuania)
- Skandinaviska Enskilda Banken (Sweden)
- List of banks in the euro area
- List of banks in Latvia
