= Magnetiq Bank =

Company based in Riga, Latvia

AS Magnetiq Bank
- Type: Joint Stock Company
- Industry: Financial services
- Founded: September 5, 2008; 18 years ago
- Headquarters: Riga, Latvia
- Services: Banking, payment service provider, eCommerce, payment infrastructure
- Net income: 423,000 (2023)
- Total assets: 164,095,000 (2023)
- Owner: Signet Bank AS
- Number of employees: 170
- Website: www.magnetiqbank.com

Magnetiq Bank (formerly JSC "LPB Bank" and Latvijas Pasta Banka) is a Latvian bank. It has stated that its focus is providing e-commerce acting as a payment service provider, fintech, business finance and brokerage services. The bank has a large proportion of non-Latvian clients.

The bank is a member of the Finance Latvia Association, which representing the Latvian financial sector on a national and international level.

In 2024, the bank changed its name to Magnetiq Bank.

== History ==
=== Foundation ===
It was founded on 5 September 2008 and changed its name to JSC "LPB Bank" on 15 December 2017. Until December 2023, JSC "LPB Bank" was wholly owned by the holding company Mono Ltd. On December 11, 2023, following approvals from the Bank of Latvia, the European Central Bank, and the Competition Council, Mono Ltd sold all its shares of JSC "LPB Bank" to JSC "Signet Bank". This transaction led to a change in ownership and beneficiaries of JCS "LPB Bank", with planned adjustments in management to align with Signet Bank's strategic and developmental objectives.

The bank head office building was initially intended for the needs of the “Aeroflot” central agency and was built between 1984 and 1991.

Modris Ģelzis, one of the trailblazers in contemporary Latvian architecture, created each façade radically differently. initially, the dominant of the building's centerpiece was a Rubik's cube, counterbalanced by a traditional building element – a nearby wind vane.

=== Investigations and fines ===
It was named in the investigation into the 2014 Moldovan bank fraud scandal, together with ABLV Bank and PrivatBank It was fined 305,000 Euros for its part in this.

In 2018, it was fined 2.2 million Euros by Latvia's Financial and Capital Market Commission (FKTK), 10% of its turnover, for "continuous non-compliance" with anti-money laundering and counter-terrorist financing legislation. The FCMC said, amongst other issues, that "the Bank failed to give sufficient weight to the unusually large, complex, inter-related transactions that have no apparent economic or visible lawful purpose".

=== New direction ===
In 2018, the bank submitted to the FCMC a new strategy of the operation foresees the focus of the provision of FinTech services, e-commerce, the banks reorientation from the CIS countries to the European Economic Area (EEA), OECD.

== See also ==
- List of banks in Latvia
