= DSK Hyp =

German subsidiary of Skandinaviska Enskilda Banken

Coordinates: 50.116705°N 8.682235°E

DSK Deutsch-Skandinavische Verwaltungs GmbH
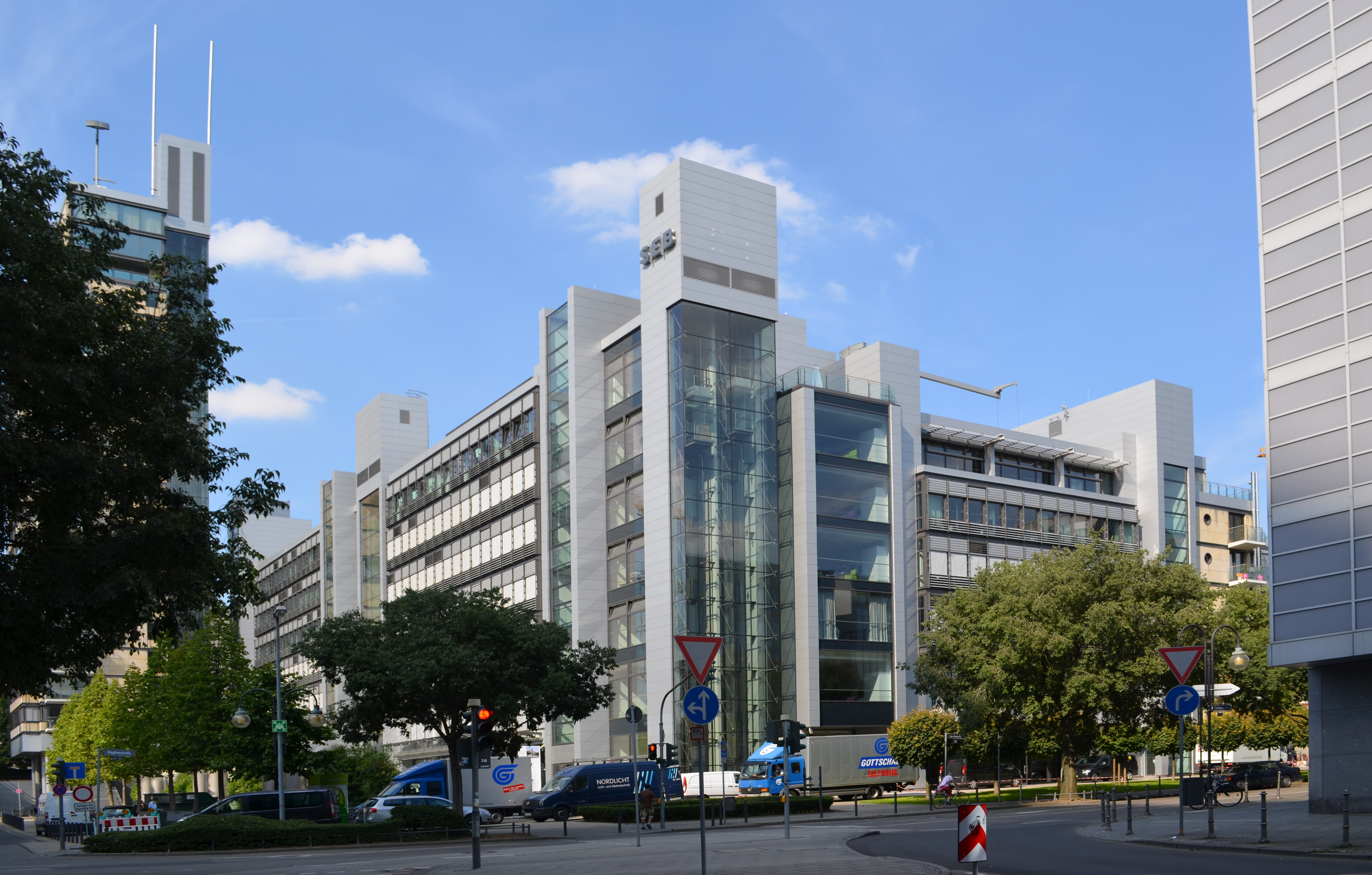
- Corporate headquarters
- Company type: Joint-stock company
- Industry: financial service activities, except insurance and pension funding
- Predecessor: Bank für Gemeinwirtschaft
- Founded: 2001
- Headquarters: Frankfurt, Germany
- Number of employees: 200
- Website: www.dskhyp.de

DSK Deutsch-Skandinavische Verwaltungs GmbH (formerly SEB AG and DSK Hyp AG) is the German subsidiary of one of the largest Swedish banks, the Skandinaviska Enskilda Banken (SEB).

== History ==
In Germany, the bank began its business activities in 1976 with its own subsidiary (Deutsch-Skandinavische Bank, later Skandinaviska Enskilda Banken AG). In the year 2000 the SEB group acquired the former Bank für Gemeinwirtschaft (BfG), which was renamed SEB AG in 2001. In the private customer business, the SEB had 174 branches and one million customers in Germany. At the end of January 2011, the SEB sold its private customer business in Germany to the Spanish Santander Consumer Bank. Since then, the bank has concentrated in Germany on its core activities, business with companies and institutional clients. As part of this strategy, the SEB AG sold its subsidiary SEB Asset Management AG at the end of August 2015, including its significant holding SEB Investment GmbH. At the beginning of 2018, the SEB transferred its main business activities – the collaboration with companies, institutional clients and international real estate investors - to a branch (SEB AG Frankfurt Branch) of the Skandinaviska Enskilda Banken AG (publ). The SEB's head office in Germany is in Frankfurt am Main, and the bank also has a location in Munich.

On 4 December 2018, SEB AG changed its name to DSK Hyp AG.

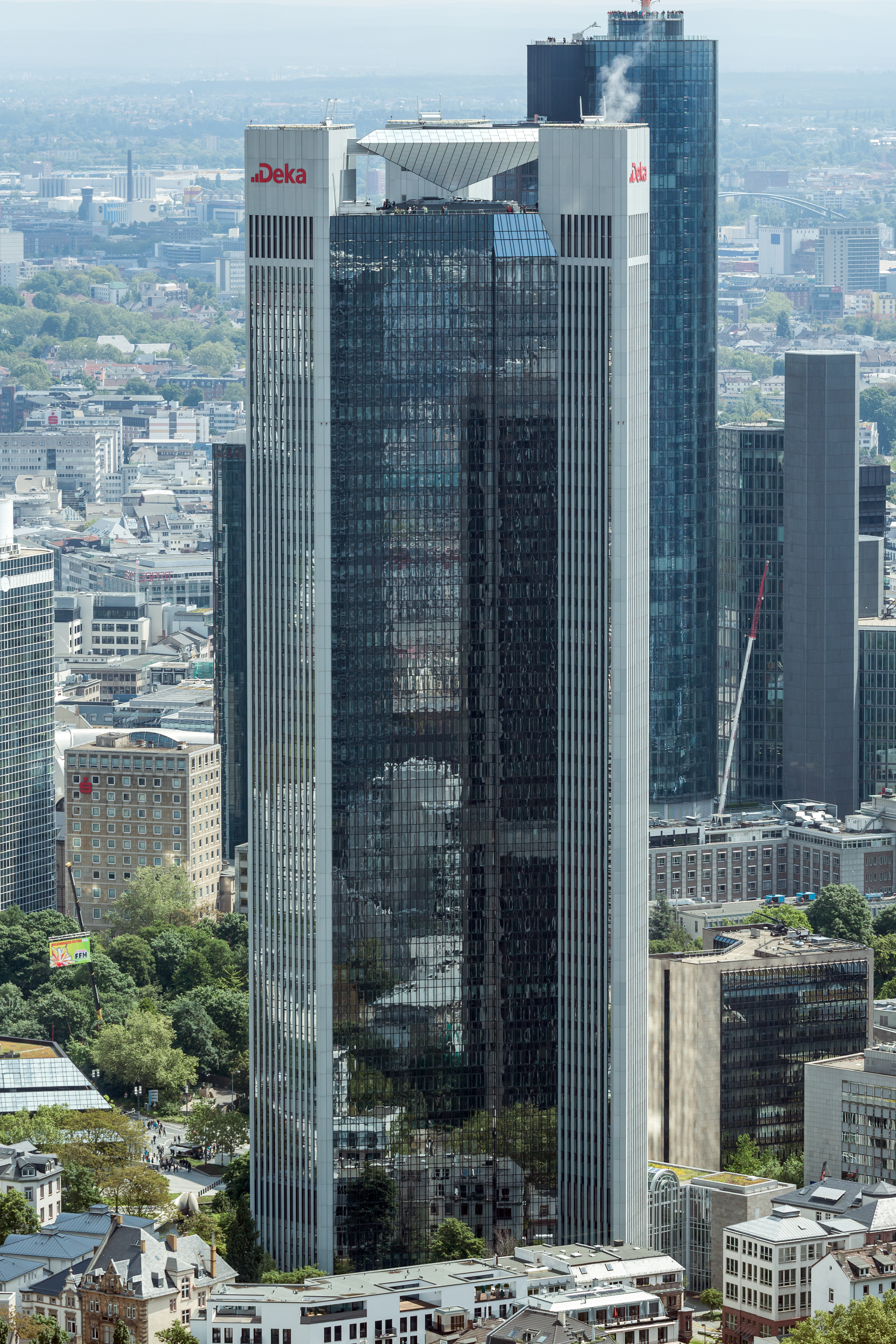
Head office 2001, Trianon, Frankfurt

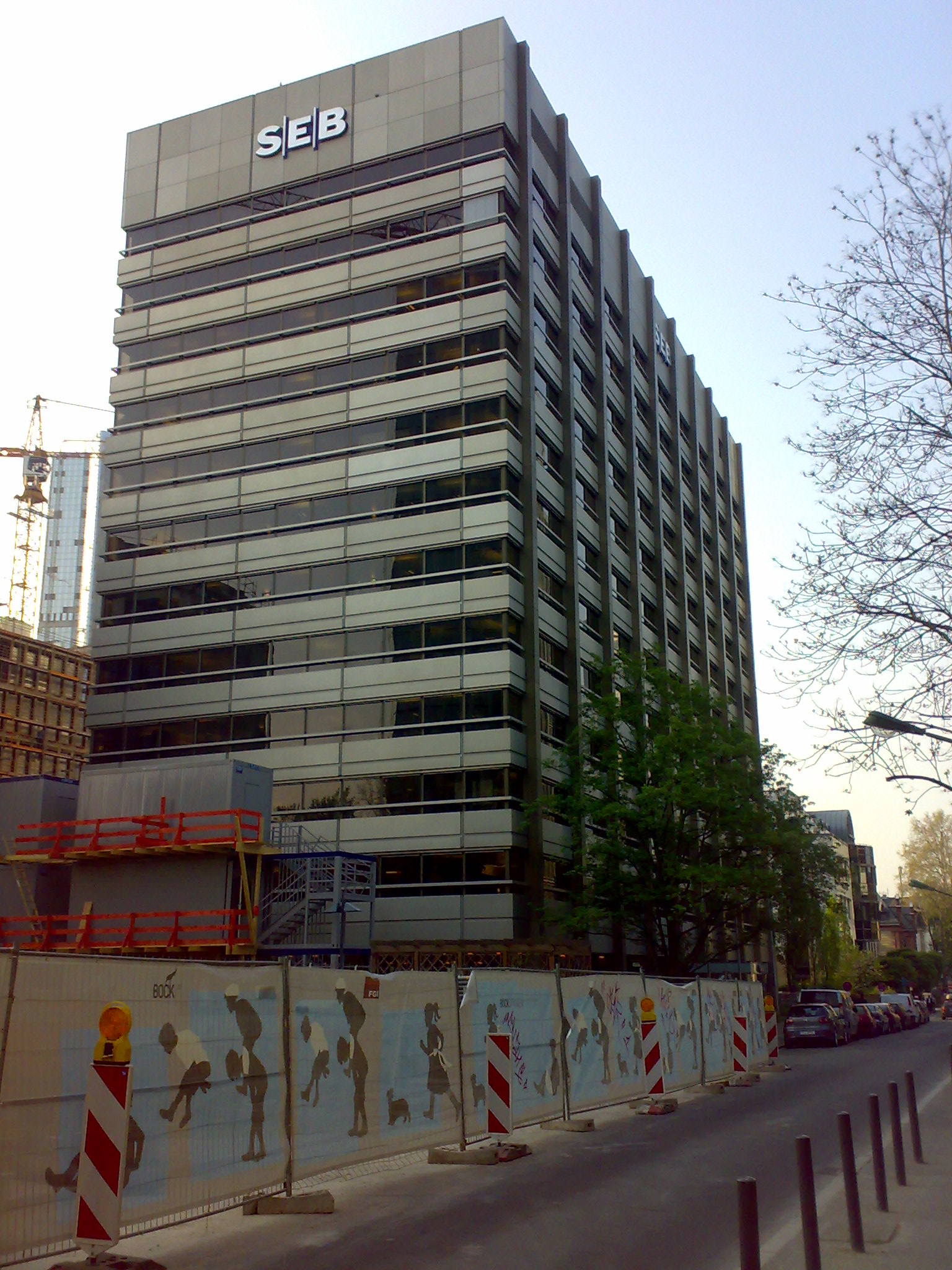
Head office 2001-2013, Ulmenstraße 30, Frankfurt

== Business ==
In Germany, the company was active in the fields of corporate clients, institutional clients and structured real estate finance. In 2005, it became the first commercial bank to issue mortgage bonds. The former SEB Hypothekenbank was therefore incorporated as a mortgage and bonds bank in the SEB AG. The bonds business of SEB in Germany continues to be operated by the SEB AG.

== Solvency ==
SEB AG was rated A2 by the Credit rating agency Moody's. Moody's rates SEB AG's public sector bonds and mortgage bonds Aaa. (As of: July 2015)

== Subsidiaries ==
- SEB Leasing GmbH (leasing services)
- Frankfurter Vermögens Holding GmbH (FVH)
