= SEB bankas =

Commercial bank in Lithuania

AB SEB Bankas

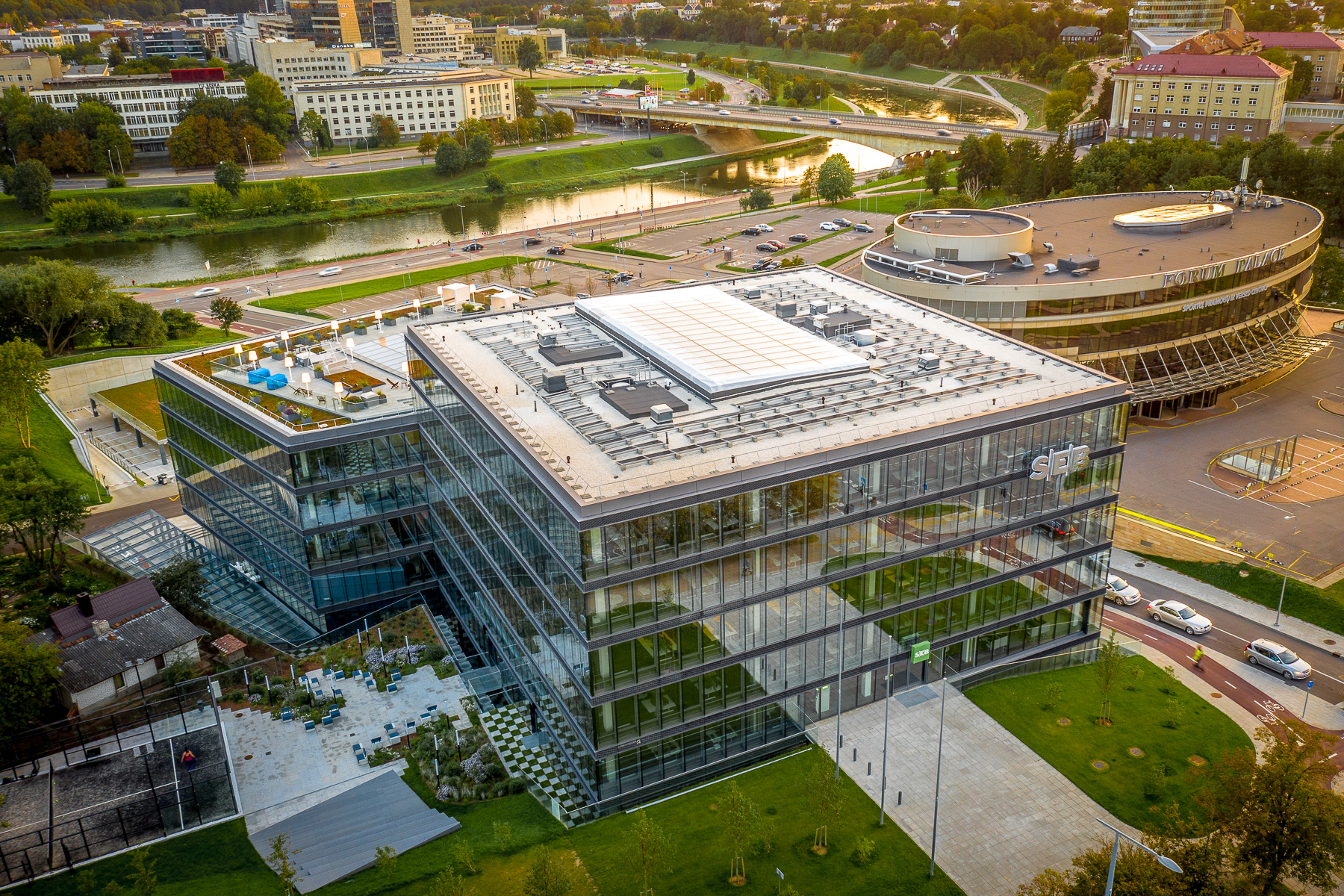
- SEB headquarters in Vilnius, Lithuania
- Formerly: Vilniaus bankas SEB Vilniaus bankas
- Company type: Subsidiary
- Founded: 29 November 1990; 35 years ago
- Headquarters: Vilnius, Lithuania
- Revenue: ▲€310.886 million (2022)
- Owner: SEB Group (100%)
- Number of employees: 1,399 (2024)

AB SEB Bankas is a commercial bank in Lithuania. It is the Lithuanian subsidiary of one of the largest Swedish banks, the SEB Group.

== History ==
It was registered as a public company in the Enterprise Register of the Republic of Lithuania on 29 November 1990 as Spaudos bankas, which was soon renamed as AB Vilniaus bankas. Vilniaus bankas introduced the first Visa credit card to Lithuania in 1993 and launched the first ATM machines in Lithuania in 1995. Vilniaus bankas signed a strategic cooperation agreement with SEB Group of Sweden in 1998 and fully rebranded itself after said Swedish parent company in 2008.

AB SEB bankas has been designated as a Significant Institution since the entry into force of European Banking Supervision in late 2014, and as a consequence is directly supervised by the European Central Bank.

== Related companies ==
There are AB SEB bankas and other SEB group companies operating in Lithuania, namely:

- UAB “SEB investicijų valdymas”
- life insurance and pension services company “SEB Life and Pension Baltic SE” Lithuanian branch
- SEB Global Services in Vilnius (legal name “Skandinaviska Enskilda Banken AB” Vilnius branch), which provides business support services (transactions, IT, human resources administration, finance and accounting) to the SEB group — its subsidiary companies and subdivisions in more than twenty countries worldwide.

The largest shareholder of SEB Bank is Skandinaviska Enskilda Banken, owning 100 percent of the bank’s shares.

== See also ==
- Skandinaviska Enskilda Banken
- SEB Pank (Estonia)
- SEB banka (Latvia)
- List of banks in the euro area
- List of banks in Lithuania
