= PrivatBank (Latvia) =

Bank based in Latvia

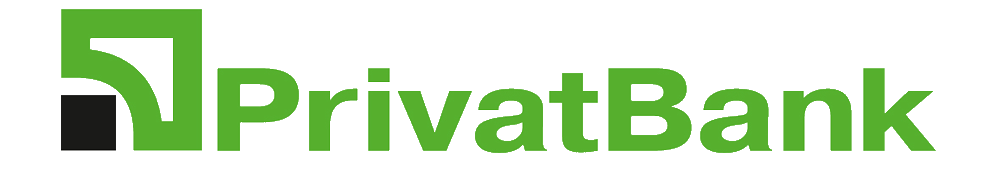
- Founded: 1992
- Headquarters: Riga, Latvia
- Website: https://www.privatbank.lv/

AS PrivatBank (former Paritate Banka) was a credit institution registered in Latvia as joint stock company which received its banking license on 31 July 1992.

== History ==
In 1992 AS "Paritate Banka" was officially registered in the registry of enterprises of the Republic of Latvia and obtained a license to carry out banking operations.

In 1993 it obtained a license to conduct foreign exchange operations.

In 1997 it obtained a Europay license. The bank becomes a full member of SWIFT.

In 1998 the bank started issuing MasterCard and Maestro payment cards.

In 2000 it obtained a Visa International license and began issuing Visa and Visa Electron cards.

A change of shareholders took place in 2001, the largest bank in Ukraine, JSC "PrivatBank", became the main shareholder of AS "Paritate Banka".

In 2002 bank was to the PrivatMoney urgent money transfer system, changed corporate style and carried out the modernization of the Internet bank (Paritate Online) was carried out.

In 2007 the bank's name was changed to AS "PrivatBank". The authorized capital was increased by 7,100,000 LVL, and its total amount became 10,650,000 LVL. Prior to 16 August 2007, the bank was known as AS Banka Paritāte. It had one branch in Italy and 13 branches in Latvia, including branches at Riga, Valmiera, Ventspils, Daugavpils, Liepāja, Rēzekne, Ludza, Cēsis, Valka and Jēkabpils. The largest shareholder of AS PrivatBank is the Ukrainian CB PrivatBank with a 46% stake, of which the founders of PrivatBank, Ihor Kolomoyskyi and Gennadiy Bogolyubov held a 49.154% stake and a 49.027% stake, respectively in JSC CB PrivatBank, which, in 2016, was the largest bank in Ukraine holding 20% of the market. With a 9.23% stake in AS PrivatBank, Igor Mazepa through his Concorde Bermuda Ltd. The Cypriot Andreas Sofocleous is an individual investor in AS PrivatBank with a large stake.

In June 2016, AS PrivatBank was the 11th largest bank in Latvia. On 9 August 2016, the Bank of Italy closed down the Italian branch of AS PrivatBank due to irregularities with the money-laundering regulations.

In December 2016, the shareholders of AS PrivatBank were JSC CB PrivatBank (Ukraine) with a 46.54% stake, Unimain Holdings Limited (Cyprus) 5.29% stake, Wadless Holdings Limited (Cyprus) 5.67% stake, Concorde Bermuda Limited (Bermuda) 9.23%, Chastely Investments Limited (Cyprus) 2.71%, Danig Limited (Bermuda) 3.47%, and individual investors with a 27.09% stake.

On 15 December 2016, PrivatBank in Ukraine was nationalized, while the government of Ukraine held a 46.54% stake in AS PrivatBank. After the 18 April 2019 Ukrainian court ruling that PrivatBank was illegally nationalized, Kolomoyskyi stated that he didn't want to control the bank but demanded $2 billion that he lost because of the nationalization.

By 2020, the Latvian branch of PrivatBank eventually closed most of its customer branches, with only 9 branches remaining, 4 of them in Riga, and employing 187 people. Ultimately, although not dissolving, the bank transferred most of its assets to local Industra Bank in July 2022, which was approved by the national finance regulator, the Finance and Capital Market Commission (FKTK), on 10 August 2022.

== See also ==
- List of banks in Latvia
