= SEB Group =

Swedish financial group for corporate customers

Skandinaviska Enskilda Banken AB

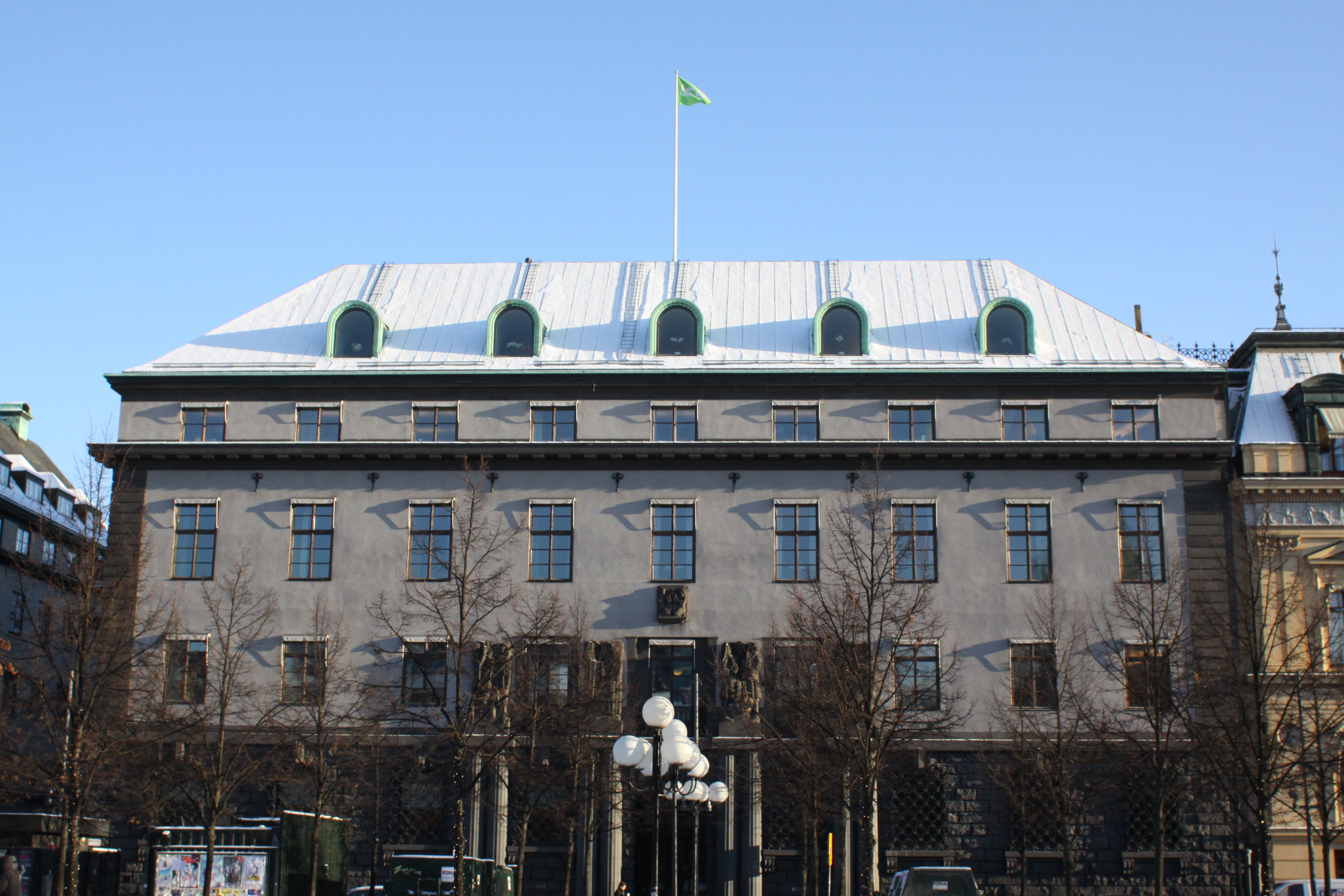
- SEB's corporate headquarters at Kungsträdgårdsgatan 8 in Stockholm
- Type: Publicly traded Aktiebolag
- Traded as: Nasdaq Stockholm: SEB A
- ISIN: SE0000148884; SE0000120784
- Industry: Financial services
- Predecessor: Stockholms Enskilda Bank (established in 1856); Skandinaviska Banken (established in 1864)
- Founded: 1972; 54 years ago
- Headquarters: Stockholm, Sweden
- Key people: Johan Torgeby (President and CEO), Marcus Wallenberg (Chairman)
- Products: Corporate and Institutional Banking Retail banking, wealth management, life insurance, pensions
- Revenue: SEK 80.19 billion (≈ USD 7.56 billion) (2023)
- Operating income: SEK 47.96 billion (≈ USD 4.52 billion) (2023)
- Net income: SEK 38.12 billion (≈ USD 3.59 billion) (2023)
- AUM: SEK 2.361 trillion (≈ USD 223 billion) (2022)
- Total assets: SEK 3.608 trillion (≈ USD 340 billion) (2023)
- Total equity: SEK 221.78 billion (≈ USD 20.90 billion) (2023)
- Owner: Investor AB (21.32%) AMF Pension & Funds (5.04%); Alecta Pension Insurance (5.03%); Swedbank Robur Funds (4.05%); SEB's own shareholding (3.5%) Other shareholders (61.06%)
- Number of employees: 17,500 (FTE, end 2023)
- Subsidiaries: SEB A/S (Denmark) SEB Pank (Estonia); DSK Hyp (Germany); SEB banka (Latvia); SEB bankas (Lithuania); SEB Corporate Bank (Ukraine); SEB Bank (Russia) SEB SA (Luxembourg)
- Website: www.sebgroup.com seb.se
- Footnotes; Source: SEB's Annual and Sustainability Report 2023. https://sebgroup.com/annualreport

Skandinaviska Enskilda Banken AB (Swedish pronunciation: [skandɪˈnɑ̌ːvɪska ˈêːnˌɧɪlːda ˈbǎŋːkɛn]; lit. "Scandinavian Private Bank"), abbreviated SEB, is a Swedish bank headquartered in Stockholm, Sweden,

In Sweden and the Baltic countries, SEB has a full financial service offering. In Denmark, Finland, Norway, Germany, and the United Kingdom, the bank's operations are focused on corporate and investment banking services to corporate and institutional clients. The bank was founded in 1972 by the Swedish Wallenberg family, which is still SEB's largest shareholder through major investment company Investor AB. SEB is the largest Swedish bank by both market capitalisation and total assets.

The SEB Group traces its origins to the Stockholms Enskilda Bank and Skandinaviska Banken, established in 1856 and 1864 respectively. Both banks played an important role in Scandinavia's industrialisation throughout the late nineteenth and early twentieth centuries, especially in Sweden. After a period of strong growth throughout the twentieth century, Stockholms Enskilda Bank and Skandinaviska Banken merged in 1972 to form the SEB Group.

SEB's German and Baltic subsidiaries, being located in eurozone countries, have been designated as Significant Institutions since the entry into force of European Banking Supervision in late 2014, and as a consequence are directly supervised by the European Central Bank.

== History ==
In 1972, Stockholms Enskilda Bank (established in 1856 by André Oscar Wallenberg) and Skandinaviska Banken (established in 1864) merged to form SEB. Reasons for the merger included creating a bank better positioned to serve corporate clients and to fend off competition from major international banks. Through its predecessor, Stockholms Enskilda Bank, it claims to be the first bank in the world to employ women.

Stockholms Enskilda Bank was founded and run by the banking-involved Wallenberg family, and served as the lynchpin of their investment throughout most of the late nineteenth and twentieth centuries. Even today, its successor is amongst the most valuable of the Wallenbergs' various companies, alongside corporations like SKF, Atlas Copco and Ericsson, which it used to have major shareholdings in until Swedish legislation changes in the early twentieth century; these holdings were taken over by Investor AB, still primarily owned by the Wallenberg family today.

Skandinaviska Banken was founded as the Skandinaviska Kreditaktiebolaget, one of the projects of the Scandinavian movement. Thanks to the efforts of André Oscar Wallenberg, Skandinaviska Banken was initially founded and headquartered in Gothenburg rather than Copenhagen, contrary to the wishes of Danish financier Carl Frederik Tietgen; its headquarters was later moved to Stockholm. After its founding, the bank expanded throughout Scandinavia and eventually the rest of the Nordic region until its merger in 1972.

In 1997, SEB acquired the insurance company Trygg-Hansa, and in 1998, the company changed its Swedish-market logo and brand name from SE-Banken to SEB. At the end of that same year, SEB bought its first shares of the three Baltic banks Eesti Ühispank in Estonia, Latvijas Unibanka in Latvia and Vilniaus Bankas in Lithuania. This was the beginning of the bank's expansion into the Baltic states, a market in which it still has a large share.

In the early twenty-first century, SEB was initially refused a merger with Swedbank, a decision made by the European Union. In 2007 and 2008, SEB worked with the World Bank to develop the concept of green bonds, a form of bonds designed to accelerate the green transition. Later on, SEB Group would sell its banking operations in Germany and Ukraine as a result of weak profitability, the former to Spain's Banco Santander.

SEB Kort AB, a subsidiary of the SEB Group, was the franchisee of Diners Club International in the Nordic Countries until closing said service on 31 May 2019, citing increased competition and regulatory pressure in the Nordic payment card market.

== Markets ==
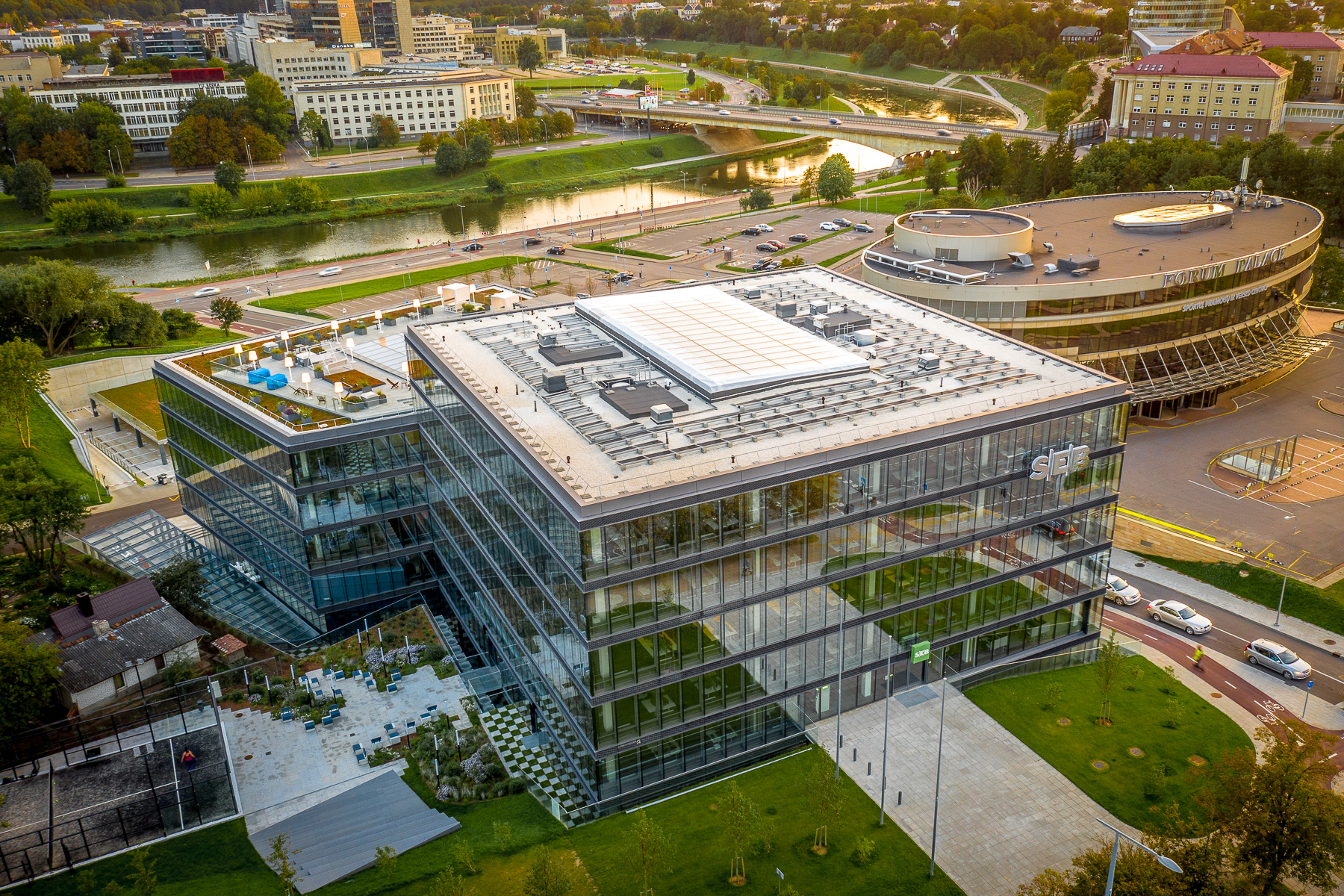
SEB Lithuanian Headquarters

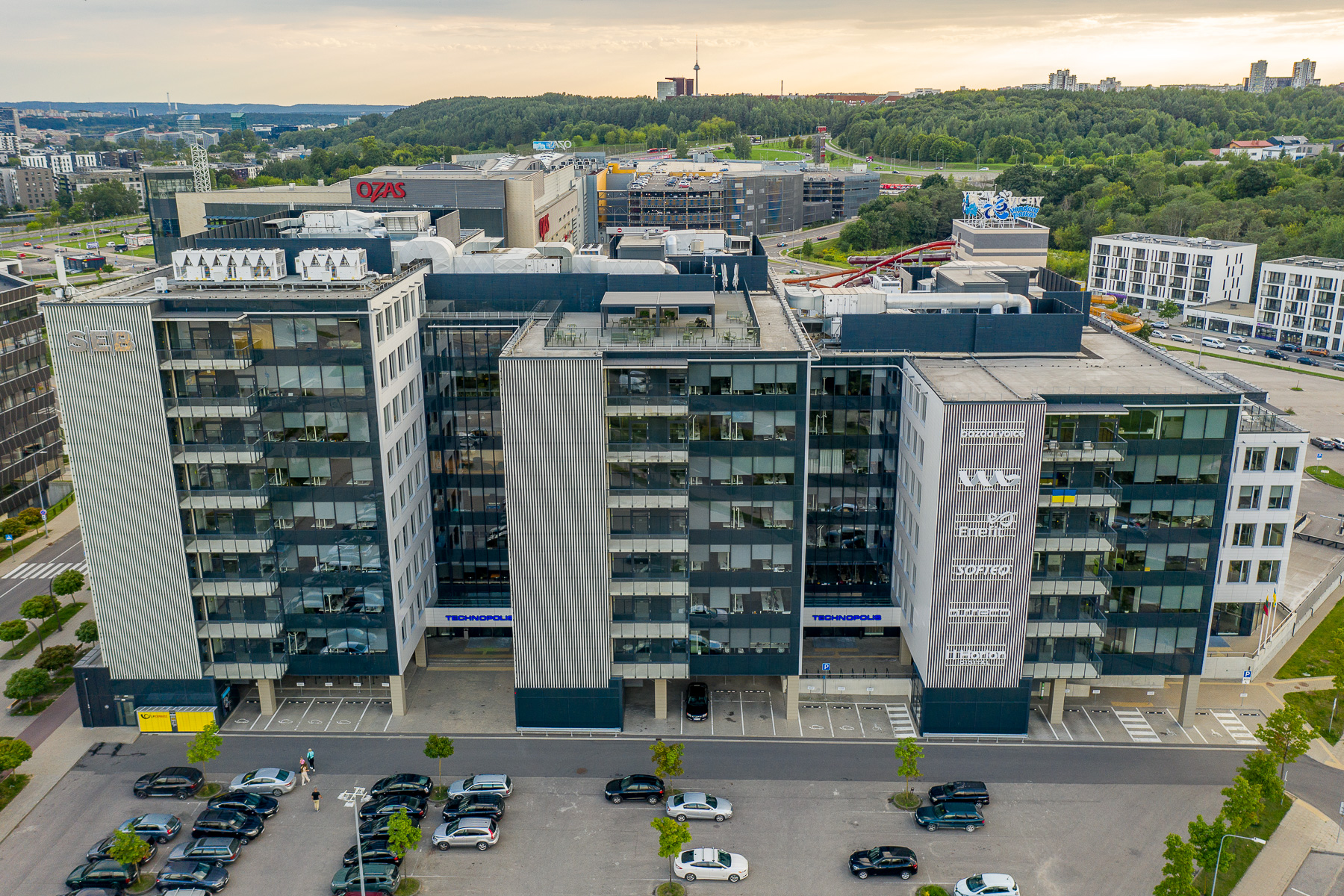
SEB shared services center in Vilnius, Lithuania

The SEB Group's primary market is its home country, Sweden, where it is also the largest bank in the country, by both market capitalisation and total assets. It is also one of the largest Swedish banks by both employees and customers, with around 17,500 of the former and four and a half million of the latter.

Other major markets of SEB are the Baltic states, where Swedish banks are prominent. SEB is one of the largest banks in Estonia, Latvia, and Lithuania, where Swedbank, another of Sweden's big four banks, is amongst its primary rivals. The SEB Group also has operations in most other Nordic countries, as well as larger foreign markets like Germany and the United Kingdom.

== Business ==
In Sweden and the Baltic countries, SEB is a universal bank, offering financial advice and a wide range of financial services to all customer segments. In Denmark, Finland, Norway, Germany and the United Kingdom the bank's operations have a strong focus on a full-service offering to corporate and institutional clients. SEB also has a presence in more than 20 locations worldwide including New York, São Paulo, London, Luxembourg, Geneva, Warsaw, Kyiv, Beijing, Shanghai, Hong Kong, Singapore and New Delhi.

SEB serves 2,000 large corporations and 1,100 financial institutions, 400,000 small and medium-sized enterprises (SMEs) and some 4 million private individuals.

The company is operating through six business divisions; Large Corporates & Financial Institutions, Corporate & Private Customers, Private Wealth Management & Family Office, Baltic, Life and Asset Management.

The SEB Group is still owned and headed by its founding family, the Wallenbergs, with Marcus Wallenberg serving as chairman of the company's board of directors. The Wallenbergs' investments in SEB primarily come through the family-owned investment company, Investor AB.

== Sustainability ==
SEB signed the UN Global Compact 2004 and has since then committed to several global initiatives and international codes of conduct. Among them are the UN Universal Declaration of Human Rights, the UN Guiding Principles on Business and Human Rights, the UNEP FI Principles for Responsible Banking, the Net-Zero Banking Alliance, the Principles for Responsible Investments and Net Zero Asset Managers initiative.

SEB has developed ten sector policies for agriculture, arms & defence, forestry, fossil fuel, gambling, mining & metals, renewable energy, shipping, tobacco and transportation. In addition, the company has thematic policies on environment (including climate change, freshwater and biodiversity) and social and human rights. In addition to having developed the green bond concept together with the World Bank in 2007 and 2008, SEB was in 2014 also part of the creation of Green Bond Principles. This is partially in line with modern Swedish ideas of focus on reducing climate change.

In 2009 SEB published its first sustainability report in line with Global Reporting Initiative (GRI) guidelines. Since 2017 the sustainability report is integrated in the Annual Report and is aligned with reporting frameworks such as Task Force on Climate-Related Financial Disclosures, TCFD and the Principles for Responsible Banking. Unlike many banks, SEB is rarely in controversy in relation to its climate policy, in contrast to larger financial institutions like JPMorgan Chase, Goldman Sachs and Credit Suisse.

== Subsidiaries ==
- Skandinaviska Enskilda Banken A/S (Denmark)
- SEB Pank (Estonia)
- DSK Hyp (formerly SEB AG) (Germany)
- SEB banka (Latvia)
- SEB bankas (Lithuania)
- SEB Corporate Bank (Ukraine)
- SEB Bank (Russia)
- SEB SA (Luxembourg)

== See also ==
- List of banks in Sweden
