= National Association of Securities Market Participants =

- Национальная ассоциация участников фондового рынка
- Abbreviation: NAUFOR (НАУФОР)
- Formation: 21 June 1996; 30 years ago
- Type: Self-regulatory organization
- Legal status: Active
- Purpose: Securities market regulation and professional standards
- Headquarters: Moscow, Russia
- Region served: Russia
- Members: 686 (as of 2024)
- Official language: Russian
- President: Alexey Timofeev
- Main organ: Board of Directors
- Affiliations: International Organization of Securities Commissions (Affiliate Member)
- Website: naufor.ru

The National Association of Securities Market Participants (Russian: Национальная ассоциация участников фондового рынка, abbreviated НАУФОР), commonly known as NAUFOR, is a self-regulatory organization (SRO) in the Russian financial market that functions as an industry association and quasi-regulator for professional participants in Russia's securities markets.

== Overview ==
NAUFOR is a non-profit, industry-wide self-regulatory association that unites brokers, dealers, asset managers, investment advisors, custodian banks, registrars, investment fund management companies, specialized depositories, and other licensed professional participants in Russia's securities ecosystem. It is the only SRO in Russia that simultaneously regulates brokers, dealers, registrars, asset managers, investment fund management companies, and specialized depositories. Membership in NAUFOR is mandatory for certain categories of financial firms under Russian law, meaning that broker-dealers and other professional securities market participants must join an SRO to operate legally in the Russian market.

As of the end of 2024, NAUFOR had 686 members, comprising 498 non-credit financial organizations, 179 banks, and 9 individual entrepreneurs. The organization is headquartered in Moscow with representative offices in Saint Petersburg, Kazan, and Yekaterinburg, and employs approximately 69 staff members.

== History ==
=== Formation (1994–1996) ===
NAUFOR's origins trace back to 1994, when 15 companies holding top positions in the Russian stock exchange market united to form the Professional Association of Securities Market Participants. The primary goal of this initial association was to introduce unified rules for processing financial documents and supporting information transparency in the financial sphere.

On 30 November 1995, the organization was formally declared as a Russian self-regulatory organization, though 21 June 1996 is considered its official date of registration. This period coincided with the broader development of Russia's post-Soviet securities market infrastructure and legal framework, including the adoption of the Federal Law No. 39-FZ "On the Securities Market" on 22 April 1996.

=== Regulatory evolution (1996–2013) ===
During this period, NAUFOR operated alongside other regulatory bodies in Russia's financial markets. Until 2013, the organization worked in coordination with the Federal Financial Markets Service (FSFM), which was established in 2004 as the primary government regulator for securities markets, insurance, and other non-banking financial activities. NAUFOR and the FSFM together represented a two-level regulatory structure intended to oversee the Russian financial market.

=== Transfer of oversight to Bank of Russia (2013–present) ===
On 1 September 2013, the FSFM was disbanded by presidential decree, and its regulatory functions were transferred to the Central Bank of Russia (Bank of Russia). Since then, the Bank of Russia has served as the primary government regulator maintaining a register of SROs, including NAUFOR, and providing oversight of their activities.

In 2023, NAUFOR consolidated self-regulatory functions for seven types of activities and became the SRO for registrars in addition to its existing mandates. This consolidation resulted in a 48% increase in membership that year.

== Legal status and regulatory framework ==
NAUFOR operates as a self-regulatory organization under Russian financial market legislation. The Bank of Russia maintains an official register of SROs in the financial market, which currently contains 11 participants, including NAUFOR.

Under Russian law, professional securities market participants are required to maintain mandatory membership in at least one self-regulatory organization. This mandatory membership requirement is established in Federal Law No. 39-FZ "On the Securities Market" and subsequent legislation governing financial market activities.

The Bank of Russia exercises oversight over NAUFOR's activities, approves its basic standards, and can issue mandatory instructions to the organization. NAUFOR, in turn, is authorized to develop and enforce internal standards that complement state regulations, creating a two-tier regulatory system.

== Membership ==
=== Membership structure ===
As of December 2024, NAUFOR's 686 members included:

- 253 brokers
- 279 dealers
- 179 asset managers
- 257 custodians
- 310 investment fund management companies
- 31 registrars
- 28 specialized depositories
- 101 investment advisors
- 2 joint-stock investment funds

By institutional type, members comprised 498 non-credit financial organizations, 179 banks, and 9 individual entrepreneurs.

=== Membership requirements ===
Membership in NAUFOR or another recognized SRO is mandatory under Russian law for entities licensed to conduct professional activities in the securities market. Licensed professional participants must join an SRO that corresponds to their licensed activities (e.g., brokerage, asset management, custody) in order to operate legally.

Members are subject to both basic standards approved by the Bank of Russia and internal standards adopted by NAUFOR. Failure to comply with these standards can result in disciplinary measures, including reprimands, warnings, fines, or recommendations for expulsion.

== Functions and activities ==
=== Standard-setting and regulation ===
NAUFOR develops and maintains standards that govern how its members conduct securities market activities, including compliance procedures and professional conduct expectations. The organization participates in Bank of Russia committees to draft basic standards and independently adopts internal standards for specific activities.

As of 2024, NAUFOR oversees compliance with 11 basic standards and 17 internal standards regulating various financial market activities. These standards cover areas such as:

- Brokerage and dealing operations
- Asset management activities
- Custody services
- Investment advisory services
- Registrar activities
- Specialized depository operations
- Protection of investor rights and interests
- Risk management and conflict of interest prevention
- Information disclosure requirements

=== Monitoring and supervision ===
NAUFOR conducts both scheduled and unscheduled inspections of its members to ensure compliance with applicable standards and regulations. The organization employs a risk-based approach to supervision, taking into account factors such as the number of clients, complaint volumes, and systemic or social significance of member organizations.

Scheduled inspections are conducted at least once every five years for each member. Unscheduled inspections may be triggered by client complaints, Bank of Russia requests, or NAUFOR's own discretion, including "secret customer" inspections to assess member compliance with investor protection and information disclosure requirements.

In 2024, NAUFOR conducted 295 inspections of member activities, including 117 scheduled inspections and 178 unscheduled inspections. Violations were identified in 35% of scheduled inspections, 6% of complaint-based inspections, and 31% of other unscheduled inspections.

=== Disciplinary proceedings ===
NAUFOR maintains a Disciplinary Committee consisting of 11 members, including 6 industry representatives, which is formed annually by the board of directors. The Committee has authority to impose various disciplinary measures on members found to have violated standards or regulations, including:

- Reprimands
- Warnings
- Orders to eliminate violations or take corrective action
- Fines (up to 1 million rubles)
- Recommendations for expulsion from NAUFOR (subject to Board of Directors approval)

In 2024, the organization reformed its disciplinary proceedings to increase the independence of the Disciplinary Committee and introduce more flexible measures that encourage members to eliminate violations and their consequences.

=== Training and certification ===
NAUFOR serves as a Qualification Assessment Center authorized by the Financial Market Professional Qualifications Council to conduct independent qualification assessments for various financial market specialists. In 2024, NAUFOR conducted 191 examinations with 407 participants and issued 282 qualification certificates.

The organization provides professional development training through seminars and courses covering topics such as brokerage and dealer activities, asset management, custody operations, internal control, accounting, taxation, and anti-money laundering/counter-terrorist financing.

Since 2022, NAUFOR has offered voluntary training and certification programs for investment advisory specialists to improve qualification levels in the industry.

=== Investment advisory software approval ===
NAUFOR is authorized to approve investment advisory software for automated consultation and execution services. As of the end of 2024, 23 investment advisory software tools were included in NAUFOR's approved software registry.

=== Industry representation ===
NAUFOR represents member interests in interactions with government regulators, particularly the Bank of Russia, and contributes to discussions on financial market policy and regulatory development. The organization participates in efforts to improve market infrastructure, transparency, and professional practices in Russia's securities markets.

== Organizational structure ==
=== Governance ===
NAUFOR's supreme governing body is the General Meeting of members. The organization is led by a Board of Directors consisting of 33 members, including 7 independent directors.

The executive leadership consists of:

- President: Alexey Timofeev
- First Vice Presidents: Ekaterina Andreeva and Kirill Zverev
- Vice Presidents: Anton Savushkin, Olga Kudinova, Ilya Vanin, and Sergey Poma (also Corporate Secretary)

Notable past leadership includes Oleg Vyugin, who served as chairman of the board of directors and previously headed the Federal Financial Markets Service from 2004 to 2007.

=== Committees and working groups ===
NAUFOR operates through various specialized committees and working groups that address specific areas of financial market activity:

Committees:

- Compliance Committee
- Brokerage Activities Committee
- Asset Management Activities Committee
- Closed-end Mutual Fund Management Committee
- Specialized Depository Activities Committee
- Institutional Investors' Assets Management Committee
- NAV Calculation Methodology Committee
- AML/CFT Committee
- Custody Activities Committee
- Risk Management Committee
- Accounting and Taxation Committee
- Economic and Information Security Committee

Boards:

- Registrars Board
- Digital Assets Board

Workgroups:

- Illegal Practices Counteraction Workgroup
- Inheritance and Personal Funds Regulation Development Workgroup
- Mutual Investment Funds Taxation Workgroup

== International engagement ==
NAUFOR is an affiliate member of the International Organization of Securities Commissions (IOSCO), the global standard-setting body for securities regulation. This affiliation connects NAUFOR to the international securities regulatory community and provides access to global regulatory standards and best practices.

In May 2010, IOSCO secretary general Greg Tanzer delivered a keynote address at NAUFOR's annual conference in Moscow, highlighting the organization's role in Russia's securities market and its connection to international regulatory efforts.

NAUFOR has published policy papers on financial market regulation, including "The Concept of Regulating Retail Forex Market in Russia," which contained 13 recommendations for regulating the over-the-counter currency market.

The Bank of Russia, as Russia's representative to IOSCO, has been a signatory to the IOSCO Multilateral Memorandum of Understanding (MMoU) on information sharing and enforcement cooperation since becoming a full signatory.

== Stock Market Elite contest ==
Since 2000, NAUFOR has organized the annual "Stock Market Elite" (Russian: Элита Фондового Рынка) competition to recognize excellence and outstanding achievements among Russian securities market participants. The contest is one of the oldest and most prestigious awards in the Russian securities market.

=== Selection process ===
Winners are selected by a national jury comprising leading market experts, heads of major brokers and management companies, representatives of financial regulatory agencies, and infrastructure organizations. Nominations are submitted by professional securities market participants who are NAUFOR members.

=== Categories ===
The contest includes approximately 16–20 nomination categories that vary by year, recognizing achievements in areas such as:

- Best Issuer
- Best Investment Bank
- Best Retail Brokerage Company
- Best Research
- Best Trading Desk
- Best Stock Market Company
- Best Bond Market Company
- Best Asset Management Company
- Best New Instrument

=== Notable winners ===
Past winners have included major Russian financial institutions and issuers:

- Tinkoff Investments – Best Retail Brokerage Company (2019)
- Sberbank CIB – Best Investment Bank and Best Research (2013, 2014)
- Sber Asset Management – Asset Management Company category
- JSC North-West Telecom – Best Issuer (2005)
- Other major issuers including Lukoil, Gazprom, and RAO UES

The competition aims to develop the Russian securities market, attract public attention to market activities, and encourage professional participants to improve their performance.

== See also ==
- Bank of Russia
- Federal Financial Markets Service
- Moscow Exchange
- National Settlement Depository
- International Organization of Securities Commissions
- Securities regulation in Russia
