= Veaceslav Platon =

Moldovan politician

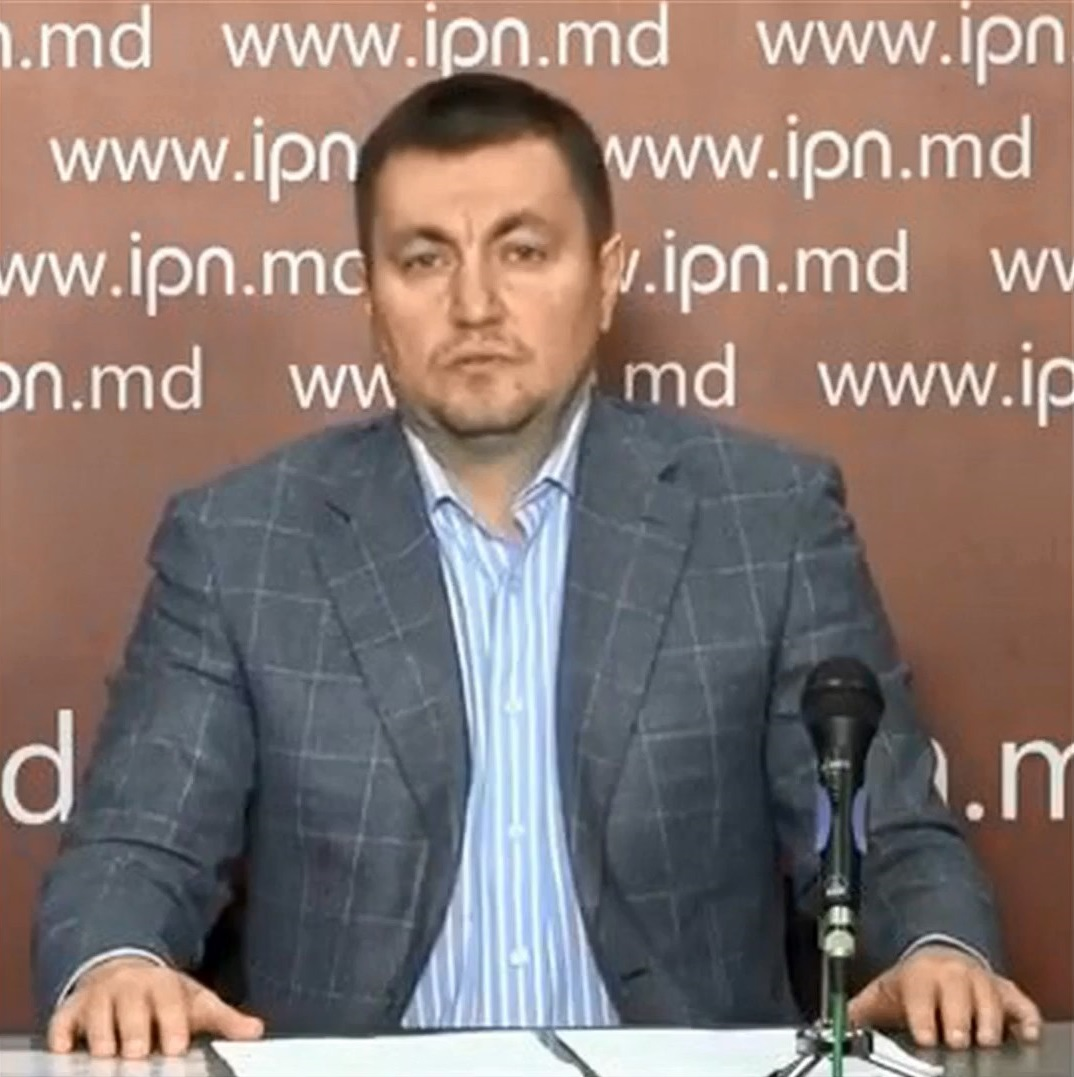
- Platon in 2021

Member of the Moldovan Parliament
- In office 22 April 2009 – 24 December 2010
- Parliamentary group: Our Moldova Alliance

Member of the Chișinău Municipal Council
- In office 23 May 1999 – 25 May 2003

Personal details
- Born: 24 January 1973 (age 53) Căușeni, Moldavian SSR, Soviet Union
- Party: Alliance Our Moldova
- Other political affiliations: Alliance for European Integration (2009–2013)
- Spouse: Evgenia Tulchevskaya
- Children: 5
- Profession: Lawyer

Veaceslav Platon (born 24 January 1973) is a Moldovan businessman and former member of the Parliament of Moldova from 2009 to 2010. He also holds Russian citizenship.

Platon is one of the wealthiest people in Moldova, with businesses in the field of sugar and banking in Moldova, and atomic energy in Ukraine. In 1994, Platon became vice-president of the administrative board of the Moldovan private bank Moldindconbank, and later became vice-president of the board of another Moldovan bank, Investprivatbank. In 1998, he was elected as a member of the Municipal Council of Chișinău on the lists of the electoral bloc of agrarians.

He was accused of economic crimes, and nicknamed "raider No. 1 in the CIS".

Platon is the alleged architect of the Russian Laundromat, a scheme to move $20–80 billion out of Russia from 2010 to 2014 through a network of global banks, many of them in Moldova and Latvia.

On 20 April 2017, Platon was sentenced to 18 years in prison. However, then he was released, re-tried, and on 14 June 2021 was acquitted. On 19 July 2021 he flew from Chișinău to London, and from there he flew to Prague.

== Personal life and views ==
Veaceslav Platon is married to Evgenia Tulchevskaya, a Ukrainian woman who at the age of 20 won the Miss Ukraine title in 2009.

In April 2021, journalist Natalia Morari gave birth to Platon's son.

Platon is a native speaker of Russian. In a 2016 interview, he said that the only way for Moldova to escape from the "disastrous situation in which it is" would be the unification with Romania.
