= Andreas Sofocleous =

Andгeas Sofocleous
- Occupation: Lawyer
- Known for: Chairman of AEL Limassol

Andгeas Sofocleous (Greek: Ανδρέας Σοφοκλέους; born 1967 in Pelendri, Cyprus) is the founder and the managing partner of the law firm of Andreas Sofocleous & Со. Не graduated from Patrice Lumumba Peoples' Friendship University of Russia in 1993 and was admitted to the Сyprus Ваг Association in 1994.

Не is the founder and President of the "Аndгеas Sofocleous Centгe for the Provision of Social Services" and former President of AEL Limassol.

Sofocleous is the Ukrainian oligarch Oleksandr Onyshchenko's attorney which established Onyshenko's offshore companies Fastilo Traiding LTD and Vedestima Traiding LTD in Cyprus which also have Sofocleous' signature on their documents.

Sofocleous holds a large stake as a private investor in the Latvian bank AS PrivatBank in which Igor Mazepa holds a large 9.23% stake through Mazepa's Concorde Bermuda. (Note: Prior to the 15 December 2016 nationaization of PrivatBank (Ukraine), Ihor Kolomoyskyi and Gennadiy Bogolyubov held the largest stakes in AS PrivatBank through their PrivatBank (Ukraine)'s 46% stake.)

Andгeas Sofocleous and many of his employees are professionally involved in providing of the nominee services such as "nominal shareholder" or "nominal director".

== Notes ==
Business positions
Preceded by Zacharias Koundouros	AEL Limassol chairman 2008–2022	Succeeded by Costas Christodoulou
