= Industra Bank =

Latvian bank

AS Industra Bank
- Type: Public
- Industry: Finance
- Founded: 1994
- Headquarters: Riga, Latvia
- Products: financial services
- Net income: 4,019,000 (2022)
- Total assets: 269,654,000 (2022)
- Number of employees: 202 (2022)

AS Industra Bank, formerly known as Meridian Trade Bank, SMP Bank, and Multibanka) is a Latvian bank, founded in 1994 in Riga.

The Bank is a member of the Latvian Financial Sector Association and the Latvian Chamber of Commerce and Industry.

== History ==
Logo until 2020

In May 2018, the Financial and Capital Market Commission imposed a fine of 455,822 euros on the bank for violations of anti-money laundering and counter-terrorism financing regulations.
