= Expobank =

Russian bank

Expobank LLC
- Type: Joint-stock company
- Industry: Financial services
- Founded: 1994; 32 years ago
- Headquarters: Moscow, Russia
- Number of locations: Over 50 points of service in Russia (including Kurskprombank)
- Products: Retail banking, corporate banking, investment banking
- Owner: Igor Kim
- Number of employees: Over 1,400 (2021)
- Website: expobank.ru

Expobank JSC is a Russian commercial bank headquartered in Moscow. It was founded in 1994 and is a subsidiary of Expobank LLC, which is registered in Cyprus. The bank offers a range of financial services, including corporate and retail banking, investment banking, and asset management.

The bank provides banking services to large corporate, Small and medium-sized enterprises (SMEs), car lending and retail customers. The bank also implements Mergers and acquisitions (M&A) deals and provides advisory support services for complex structured transactions.

Along with other Russian banks, Expobank was sanctioned by the U.S. Department of the Treasury Office of Foreign Assets Control in December 2023 due to the Russian invasion of Ukraine.

== History ==
Expobank was founded in 1994. In 2008, the bank was acquired by UK based Barclays Group and renamed to Barclays Bank LLC.

In 2011, the bank was acquired from Barclays by investors including Igor Kim. The acquisition of Expobank was recognized as the Deal of the Year 2011 in the M&A market. Early in 2012, the bank was fully rebranded, having back its former name of Expobank LLC.

In September 2012, Expobank acquired 100% of shares in Sibbusinessbank OJSC. In December 2012, Expobank reached an agreement to consolidate assets with CB Stromcombank Ltd. As a result, Stromcombank continued its operations as Expobank's Branch in the Krasnoyarsk Territory. The merger process was completed in March 2013.

In September 2014, Expobank successfully closed the deal on the acquisition of 100% of shares in German Landesbank Baden-Württemberg's Czech subsidiary, LBBW Bank CZ a.s. The acquiree's rebranding was completed in 2014, with it being renamed to Expobank CZ a.s.

In March 2015, the acquisition of MAK-Bank from ALROSA Diamond Mining Company was announced. The bank merged with Expo in June 2015.

In November 2015, Expobank and Royal Bank of Scotland Group agreed on the acquisition of RBS's subsidiary in Russia, The Royal Bank of Scotland ZAO. The deal was closed in April 2016. According to EMEA Finance, the acquisition of RBS's subsidiary was recognized as the Deal of the Year 2015.

In December 2017, Expobank completed the deal on the acquisition of JSCB Yapi Kredi Bank Moscow, JSC from Turkish Yapi Kredi Bankasi A.Ş. Yapi Kredi Bank Moscow was the first Turkish bank to appear in Russia: in 1988 as a Representative Office, and in 1993 as a holder of a license from the Bank of Russia. Upon its integration Yapi Kredi Bank Moscow was merged to Expobank in 2018.

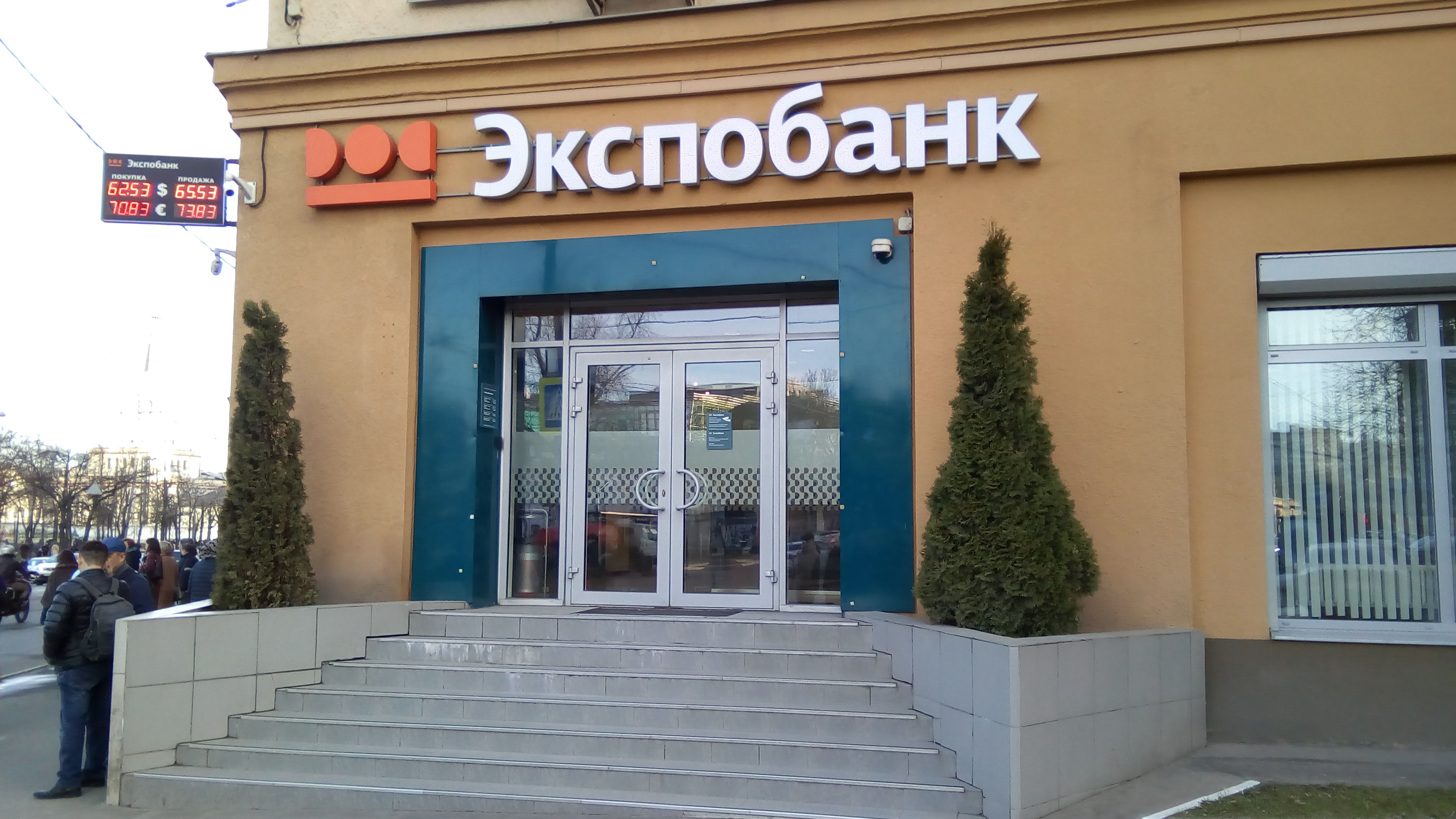
Expobank branch in Moscow, Russia in 2019

In 2019, Expobank came to an agreement with the shareholders of Kurskprombank PJSC on the acquisition of the controlling stake. By that time Kurskprоmbank had been operating in the market for over 29 years and was the biggest bank in Russia's Black Earth region in terms of assets. In January 2020, Kursprombank was merged to Expobank as the Central Black Earth Region Branch continuing its operations under the Expo brand.

In August 2020, Expobank was the first bank in Russia to extend a loan secured by a digital. asset

In August 2021, Expobank completed its reorganization by transformation into a joint-stock company (JSC) from a limited liability company (LLC). Change of its legal form is aimed at the strengthening of the bank's transparency, ratings, and its further organic growth.

In December 2023 Expobank was sanctioned by the U.S. Department of the Treasury Office of Foreign Assets Control. The bank being designated pursuant to E.O. 14024 for operating or having operated in the financial services sector of the Russian Federation economy. A licence, valid till 21 March 2024, was however granted to effect the wind down of a business and to close accounts, provided payments to sanctioned parties went into blocked accounts.

In February 2024, Russian President Vladimir Putin allowed Expobank to acquire the Russian division of the British bank HSBC. An agreement on the sale was reached in the summer of 2022, but permission from the authorities was required. The division's annual revenue is estimated at $15 million, and the number of employees is about two hundred.

== Performance ==
The bank has around 50 branches in the largest cities of Russia, including: Moscow, St. Petersburg, Novosibirsk, Kemerovo, Kursk, Voronezh, Orel, Bryansk, Nizhny Novgorod, Omsk, Belgorod, Yekaterinburg, Perm, Ufa, Krasnoyarsk, Surgut, Vladivostok, Khabarovsk, Yuzhno-Sakhalinsk.

== Ratings ==
Expo’s high credit ratings (‘ruА-’, Outlook Stable (Expert RA), ‘A-.ru’, Outlook Stable (NKR)) reflect the bank’s financial stability, high return on equity and solid capital adequacy.
