= Igor Kim =

Russian businessman (born 1966)

- Игóрь Влади́мирович Ки́м
- Born: 12 January 1966 (age 60); Ushtobe, Kazakh Soviet Socialist Republic
- Occupations: Banker, investor
- Years active: 1992–present
- Known for: Chairman of the Board of Directors of Expobank JSC, Chairman of the Supervisory Board of Expobank CZ a.s., Member of the board of directors of AS Expobank, Stakeholder of Expobank JSC
- Awards: Honored economist of the Russian Federation

Igor Vladimirovich Kim (Russian: Игорь Владимирович Ким; born 12 January 1966) is an investor, banker, Honored economist of the Russian Federation, who has successfully completed more than 30 mergers and acquisitions transactions with both Russian and foreign financial institutions. He is the main stakeholder of Expobank JSC (Russia). Kim's fortune has been estimated at $460 million by the Russian edition of Forbes business magazine in 2013.

== Early life and career ==
Igor Kim was born on 12 January 1966 in Ushtobe, Alma-Ata region (Kazakh Soviet Socialist Republic). In 1990 he graduated from Novosibirsk State University with a degree in Economic Cybernetics with a degree in mathematical economics.

After graduation, he went into business, creating a cooperative on the basis of a local student construction team. He later traded on one of the many commodity markets of that time. In 1992, he became one of the founders of the Ruskii Narodnyi Bank (RNB, Russian: Русский народный банк). He has been engaged in banking activities for more than 20 years.

Igor Kim was one of the hundred richest people twice according to Forbes Russia, in 2009 ($0.4 billion) and then in 2011 ($0.5 billion).

== Banking career ==
- 1993 – became the main owner of the Russkii Narodnyi Bank, first becoming the Deputy Chairman of the Management Board, and later the Chairman of the Management Board.
- 1995 – appointed chairman of the board of Russkii Narodnyi Bank.
- 1998–2004 – appointed Chairman of the Management Board, and then chairman of the board of directors of Sibacadembank (Russian: Сибакадембанк).
- 2001–2004 — appointed chairman of the board of "Kaspiiskii" Bank (Russian: Каспийский банк, Kazakhstan).
- 2004 – became a member of the board of directors of Uralvneshtorgbank (Russian: Уралвнешторгбанк), becoming its chairman.
- 2005 — became a controlling stakeholder of Sibacadembank and Uralvneshtorgbank.
- 2006 — merged the two banks into one under URSA Bank (Russian: УРСА банк) brand, becoming the chairman of the board of directors of the new financial institution.
- 2008 — the shareholders of URSA Bank and MDM Bank (Russian: МДМ банк) decided to merge them, while Igor Kim was chosen as the head of the Management Board and became a member of the board of directors of the now united MDM Bank.
- 2010 — left the Management Board of MDM Bank.
- 2011 — together with partners Kim acquired Barclays Bank LLC from the Barclays banking group and returned to its purchased asset its original name Expobank LLC.
- 2012 – acquired a subsidiary bank VestLB Vostok (Russian: ВестЛБ Восток) from a major European commercial bank WestLB AG. With the participation, Expobank LLC acquired FB-Leasing from VR Leasing AG (later merged with Expobank LLC) and LBBW Bank CZ a.s., which was renamed to Expobank CZ a.s.
- 2015 – Expobank LLC acquired 100% of MAK-Bank (Russian: МАК-банк) from the ALROSA diamond mining company, which was also merged with Expobank LLC.
- In November 2015, Expobank LLC and the Royal Bank of Scotland group agreed to purchase the RBS subsidiary in Russia, the Royal Bank of Scotland CJSC. On 1 April 2016, the transaction was successfully completed. As of 1 August 2016, the Bank was merged with Expobank LLC. As part of the Achievement Awards on 9 June 2016, EMEA Finance magazine recognized the acquisition of the Royal Bank of Scotland's Russian subsidiary as the best M&A deal in 2015.
- In December 2017, Expobank LLC successfully completed a deal with the Turkish Yapı ve Kredi Bankası A.Ş. to acquire 100% stake in JSCB AKB Yapi Credit Bank Moscow. Yapi Credit Bank Moscow is the first Turkish bank to appear in Russia: in 1988 as a Representative Office, and in 1993 as a holder of a license from the Central Bank of the Russian Federation.
- 2018 — the integration process was completed and Yapi ve Kredi Bankasi A.S. was merged with Expobank.
- 2019 – Expobank reached an agreement with the shareholders of Kurskprombank PJSC (Russian: ПАО "Курскпромбанк") on the acquisition of a controlling stake. Kurskprombank has been operating on the market for 29 years and is the largest bank by assets in the Central Black Earth economic region.

== Expobank JSC ==
Expobank JSC is a modern private Russian bank that has been successfully operating in the market for over 28 years in large corporate, SME, car lending and retail segments.

Its team has an extensive experience in the implementation of M&A deals and provides advisory support services for complex structured transactions.

Expobank is among top 50 largest Russian banks and has a sustainable competitive position in the financial market.

Expo’s high credit ratings (‘ruА-’, Outlook Stable (Expert RA), ‘A-.ru’, Outlook Stable (NKR)) reflect the bank’s financial stability, high return on equity and solid capital adequacy.

The bank has around 50 offices in the largest cities: Moscow, St. Petersburg, Novosibirsk, Kemerovo, Kursk, Voronezh, Orel, Bryansk, Nizhny Novgorod, Omsk, Belgorod, Yekaterinburg, Perm, Ufa, Krasnoyarsk, Surgut, Vladivostok, Khabarovsk, Yuzhno-Sakhalinsk.

== Scholarship Programme ==
In Novosibirsk, Igor Kim established a scholarship for students of the Faculty of Economics of NSU. Its purpose is to help out talented students and generate their interest in banking. In 4 years more than 400 people took part in the programme, 22 scholarships were paid.

== Awards ==
Igor Kim was twice recognized as the "Banker of the Year" in Russia, first in 2003 and then 2009. In 2006 he was awarded with the Honorary Badge "For Honor and Valor" of the National Public Award "Russian National Olympus". In 2018, Igor Kim was awarded with the Honorary title "Honored Economist of the Russian Federation" (Decree No. 608 of 25 October 2018 on rewarding for services in the field of economics and finance, as well as many years of conscientious work).
