= TBB =

TBB may refer to:

== Organizations ==
- Telekom Baskets Bonn, a German professional basketball team
- Tennis Borussia Berlin, a German football club
- Thomas Built Buses, American bus manufacturer
- Turkish Banks Association, Türkiye Bankalar Birliği
- Turkish Bars Association, Türkiye Barolar Birliği
- TBB pank, commercial bank in Estonia

== Other uses ==
- Main-Tauber-Kreis, Tauberbischofsheim, code used on German vehicle registration plates
- Threading Building Blocks, a software library developed by Intel Corporation
- Thunersee–Beatenberg Bahn, a funicular in the Swiss canton of Bern
- Tor Browser Bundle, a set of software for browsing the Internet over the Tor network
- IATA code for Dong Tac Airport
- Tampa Bay Buccaneers, a professional American football franchise founded in 1976
- Tbb - Trypanosoma brucei brucei, a parasite of livestock and wildlife
