= Latvijas Krājbanka =

Company based in Riga, Latvia

- Type: Joint stock company
- Traded as: Nasdaq Baltic: LKB1R Nasdaq Baltic: LKB2R
- Industry: Banking
- Predecessor: Latvian Postal Savings Bank
- Founded: 1924
- Fate: In liquidation
- Headquarters: Riga, Latvia
- Number of locations: 155 service centres
- Area served: Latvia
- Key people: Raimondas Baranauskas (Chairman); Ivars Priedītis (CEO)
- Revenue: LVL 34.6 million (2009)
- Net income: ▼LVL 1.9 million (2009)
- Owner: Bank Snoras (53.2%); Vladimir Antonov (31.96%)
- Number of employees: 941 (2009)
- Website: lkb.lv

Latvijas Krājbanka (lit. 'Latvian Savings Bank') was a Latvian bank listed on the Riga OMX exchange (Nasdaq Baltic: LKB1R,Nasdaq Baltic: LKB2R).

== Overview ==
Pasta krājkase was originally founded in 1924 as the Latvian postal savings bank. Under the Latvian SSR, it was integrated into the Savings Bank of the USSR. Following the regained Latvian independence, it was re-formed under the name Latvijas Krājbanka.

The privatisation process of the bank was initiated in 1997 and concluded in 2003. The main shareholders were Lithuanian based Snoras banking group and the Russian businessman Vladimir Antonov. In 2009, Latvijas Krājbanka had a turnover revenue of 34.6 million Latvian lats with a loss of 1.9 million lats. The bank had 941 employees and 155 customer service centres in Latvia.

2009 was a year of severe economic crisis in Latvia, with a sharp drop in GDP, exports and imports, and sharp declines in construction, retail, manufacturing and other sectors of the economy. In 2009, Latvijas Krājbanka's turnover was LVL 34.6 million, with a loss of LVL 1.9 million. Later that year, the bank celebrated its 85th anniversary and Ivars Priedītis took over as Chairman of the Board.

In 2010, the improvement of the Latvian economy also affected the performance of the banking sector. Savings Bank continued its activities and development, including supporting important cultural events.

In November 2011, the bank was taken over by the Latvian government and liquidated due to bankruptcy of Snoras. In May 2012 the bank lost its banking license. Antonov was accused of fraud and misappropriation of US$290 million. In August 2012 Antonov was sentenced to six years and another board member Ivars Priedītis to five years in prison. Assets were also seized from both Antonov and Priedītis. A total of EUR 6.1 million was not withdrawn by clients from the banks accounts before the end of the guaranteed remuneration.

== See also ==
- Eesti Hoiupank
- Lietuvõs Taũpomasis Bánkas
- List of banks in Latvia
