= Kersti Kaljulaid =

President of Estonia from 2016 to 2021

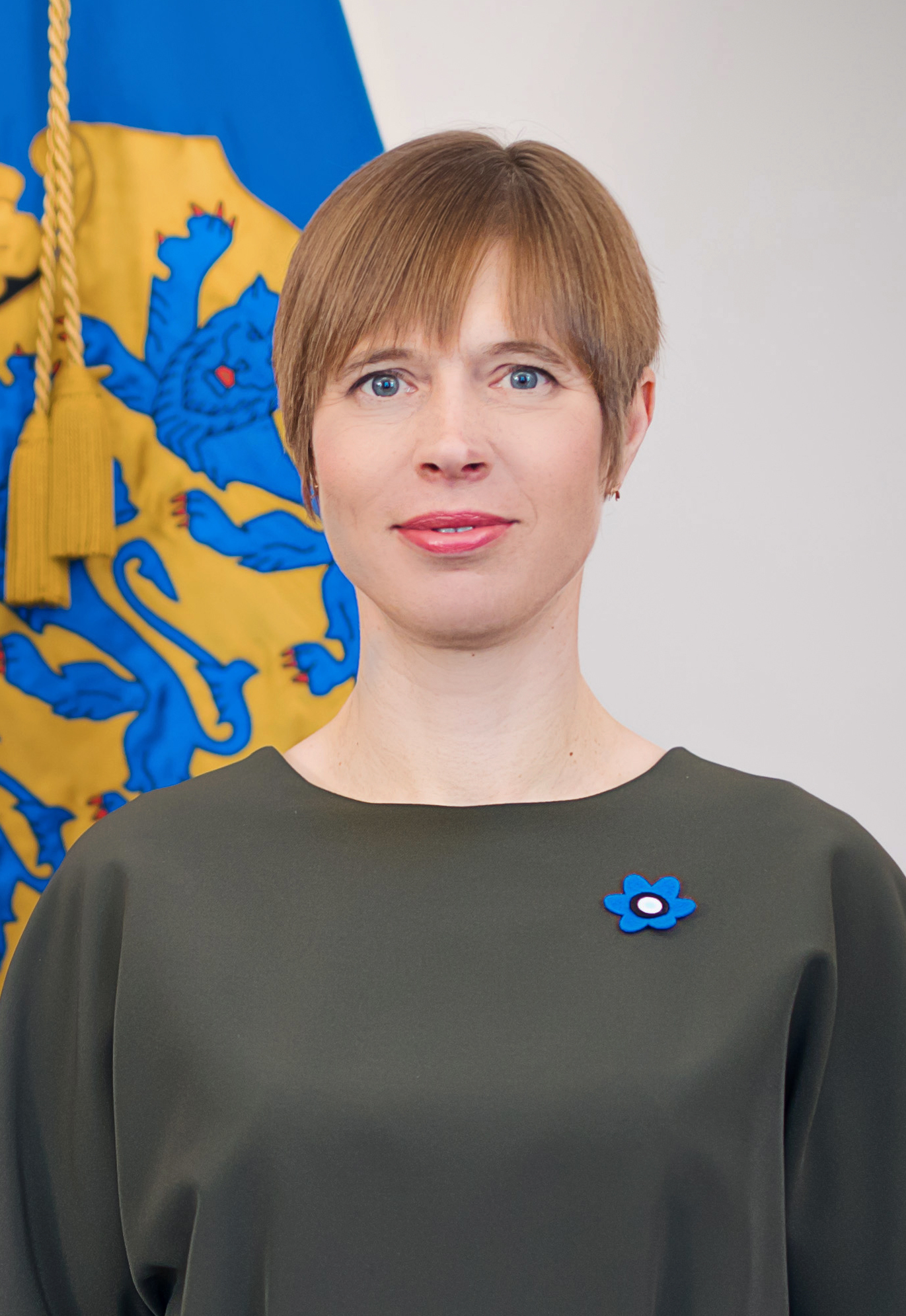
- Kaljulaid in 2018

5th President of Estonia
- In office 10 October 2016 – 11 October 2021
- Prime Minister: Taavi Rõivas; Jüri Ratas; Kaja Kallas
- Preceded by: Toomas Hendrik Ilves
- Succeeded by: Alar Karis

Member of the European Court of Auditors for Estonia
- In office 7 May 2004 – 2 October 2016
- President: Juan Manuel Fabra Vallés; Hubert Weber; Vítor Manuel da Silva Caldeira
- Preceded by: Position established
- Succeeded by: Juhan Parts

Personal details
- Born: 30 December 1969 (age 56) Tartu, then part of Estonian SSR, Soviet Union
- Party: Independent
- Other political affiliations: Pro Patria Union (2001–2004)
- Spouse: Georgi-Rene Maksimovski (m. 2011)
- Children: 4
- Relatives: Raimond Kaljulaid (half-brother)
- Education: University of Tartu

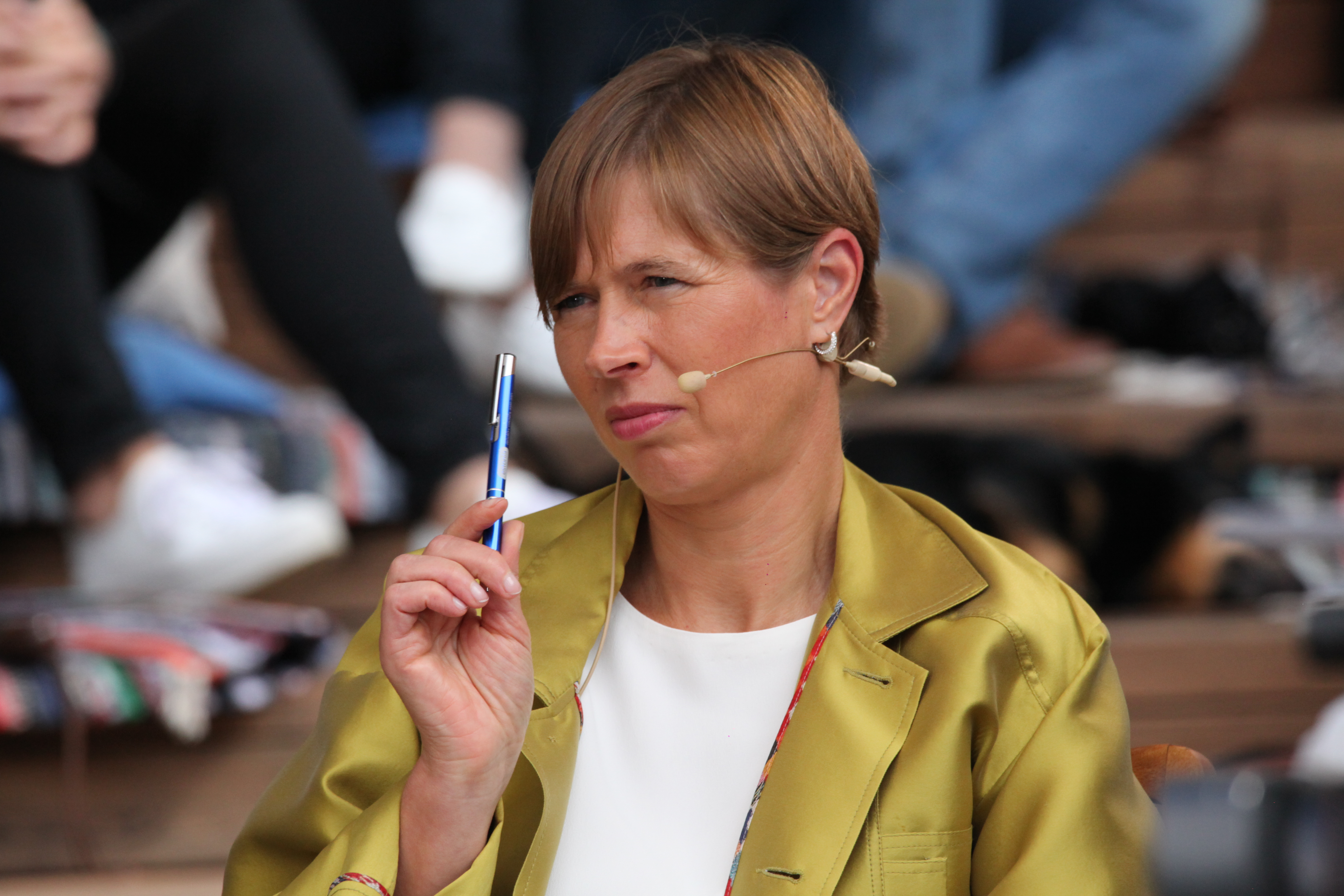
Kersti Kaljulaid at the Opinion Festival 2021 in Paide, Estonia

Kersti Kaljulaid (Estonian pronunciation: [ˈkersʲːtʲi ˈkɑlʲːjuˈlɑi̯ːːt]; born 30 December 1969) is an Estonian politician who served as the fifth president of Estonia between 2016 and 2021. Kaljulaid is Estonia's first female head of state since the country declared independence in 1918. She was also the youngest president, aged 46 at the time of her election.

Kaljulaid, a state official who at the time served as Estonia's representative in the European Court of Auditors, entered the 2016 Estonian presidential election race in the sixth round after five previous unsuccessful rounds. She was nominated on 30 September 2016 by the majority of parliamentary parties as a joint candidate for president, and the only official candidate for the sixth round. Kaljulaid was voted president on 3 October 2016, with 81 votes and 17 abstentions.

In 2024, she was elected the next Estonian Olympic Committee president for a four-year term, but was voted out through a vote of no confidence in April 2026.

== Early life and education ==
In 1987, Kaljulaid graduated from Tallinn Secondary School no. 44. During her studies there, she was a member of the Students' Scientific Association, specializing in ornithology. In 1992, she graduated from University of Tartu cum laude as a biologist. She is a member of Estonian female student corporation, Filiae Patriae. In 2001, she graduated from the University of Tartu with an MBA in business management. Her thesis was titled as "Riigi poolt asutatud sihtasutuste juhtimissüsteemi täiustamine" or "The improvement of the management system of state-founded foundations" in English.

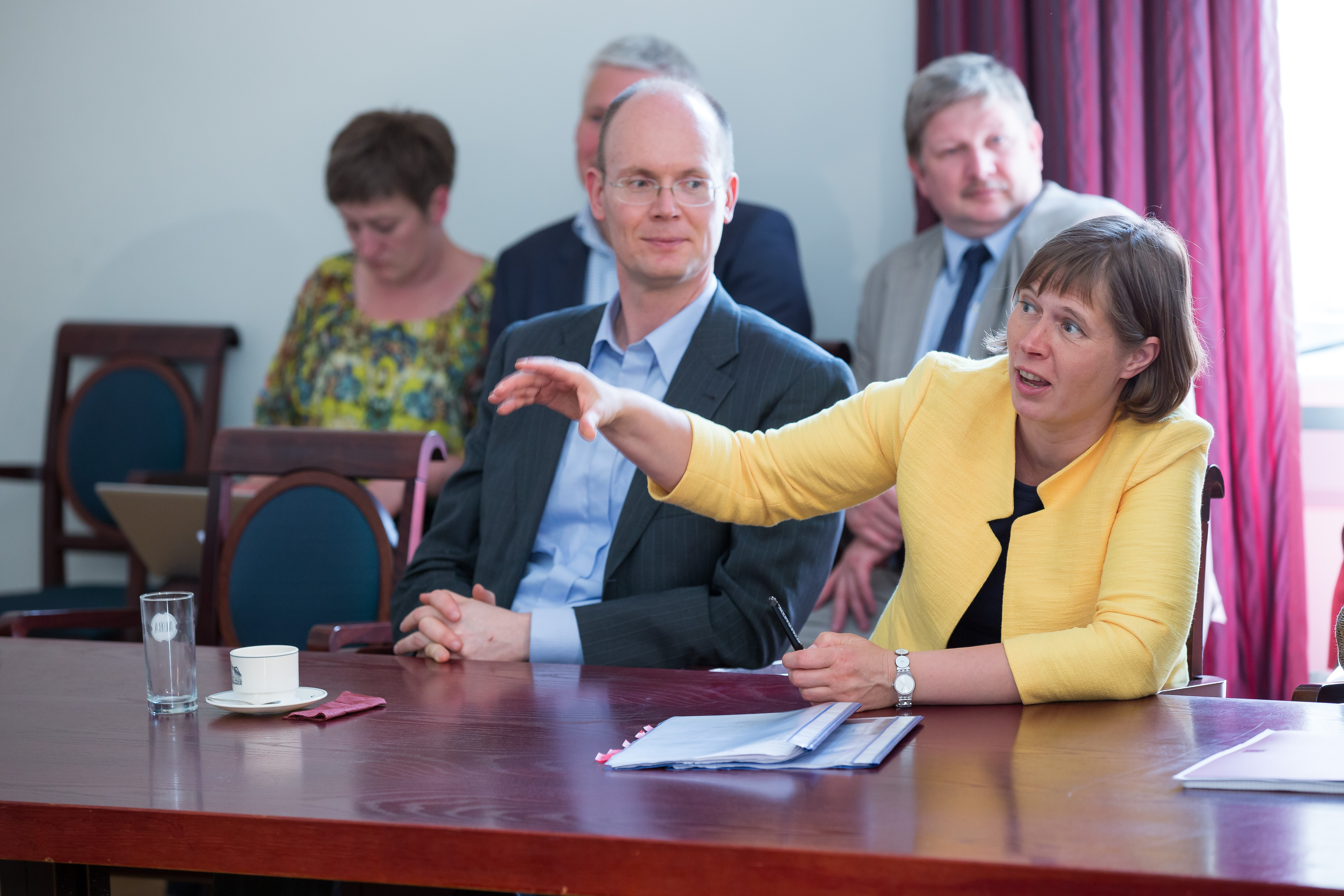
University of Tartu Council seminar in 2015.

== Career ==
=== Business career ===
From 1996 to 1997 Kaljulaid was a sales manager in state-owned telecom Eesti Telefon and from 1997 to 1998 a project manager in Hoiupanga Investeeringute AS. From 1998 to 1999 she was employed in Hansabank's investment banking division Hansabank Markets. From 1999 to 2002, Kaljulaid worked as the economic advisor of Estonian Prime Minister Mart Laar. From 2002 to 2004, she was the director of Iru Power Plant, a subsidiary of the state-owned energy company Eesti Energia. She was the first woman to lead a power plant in Estonia.

In 2004, when Estonia joined the European Union, Kaljulaid was appointed the country's representative at the European Court of Auditors. Since 2011, Kaljulaid has been the chairperson of the board of the University of Tartu.

=== Political career ===
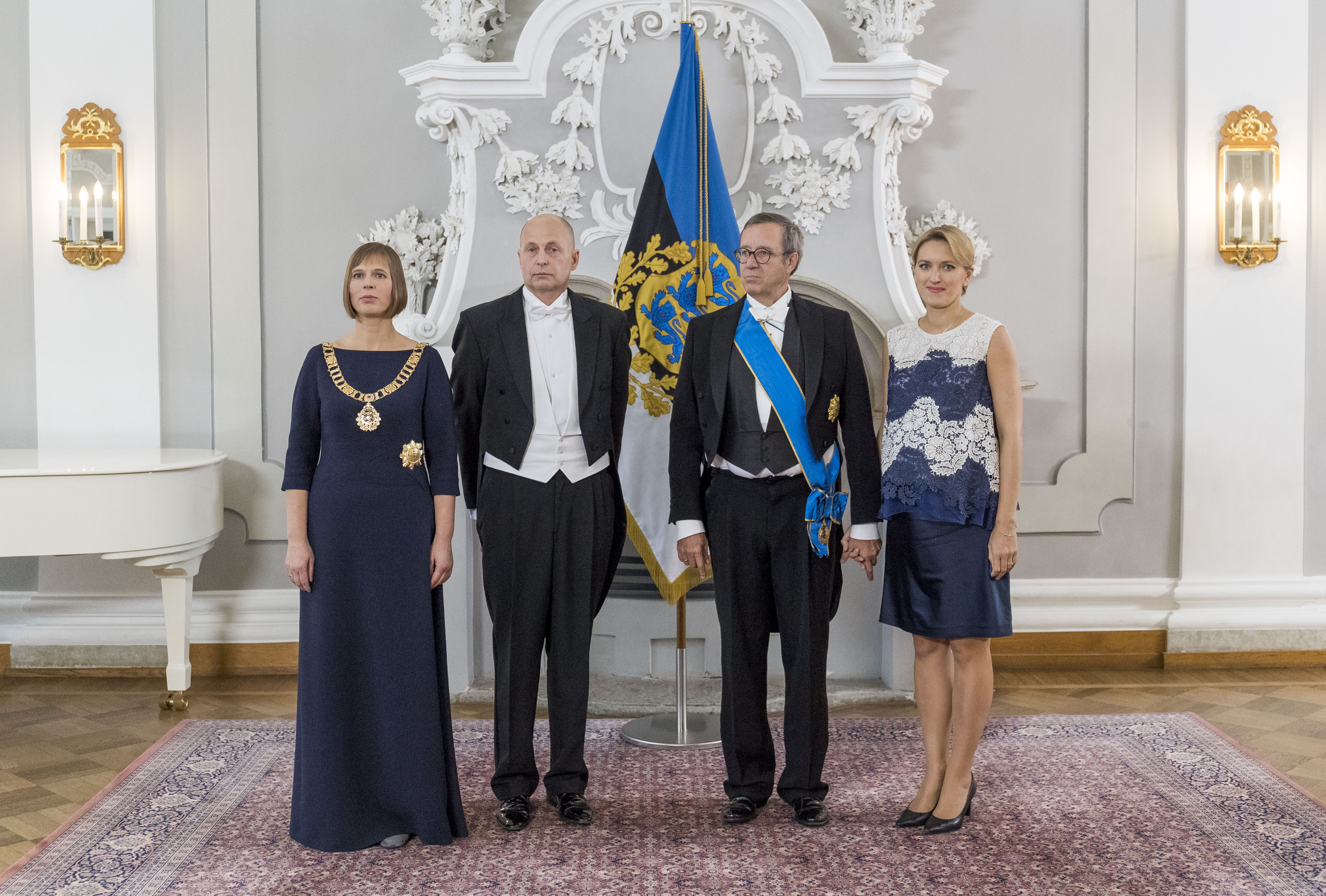
Kaljulaid, her husband Georgi-Rene Maksimovski, outgoing President Toomas Hendrik Ilves, and his wife Ieva Ilves at Kaljulaid's inauguration, Kadriorg Palace, Tallinn, 10 October 2016

Kaljulaid has defined herself as a liberal conservative. She has spoken in support of strong civil society with less state interference, whilst placing high importance on helping those in need. She holds liberal views on social issues such as LGBT rights and immigration. She has often published opinion pieces in Estonian media, considering the position of Estonia in the European Union and on social and economical matters. Additionally, she has been a regular participant in political analysis programmes of Radio Kuku, e.g. "Keskpäevatund".

From 2001 to 2004, Kaljulaid was a member of the political party Pro Patria Union, a predecessor of the current Pro Patria and Res Publica Union, yet did not run in the elections.

As Kaljulaid's term as a member of the European Court of Auditors was due to end on 7 May 2016, she was confirmed as the next head of PRAXIS Center for Policy Studies in November 2015. Although the Estonian government should have proposed her replacement in the court by 7 February 2016, it still had not managed to do so by the end of her term, so she remained in the position.

On 19 September 2016, the freshly founded Development Monitoring Advisory Board at the chancellery of Estonian Parliament voted Kaljulaid to be its chair.

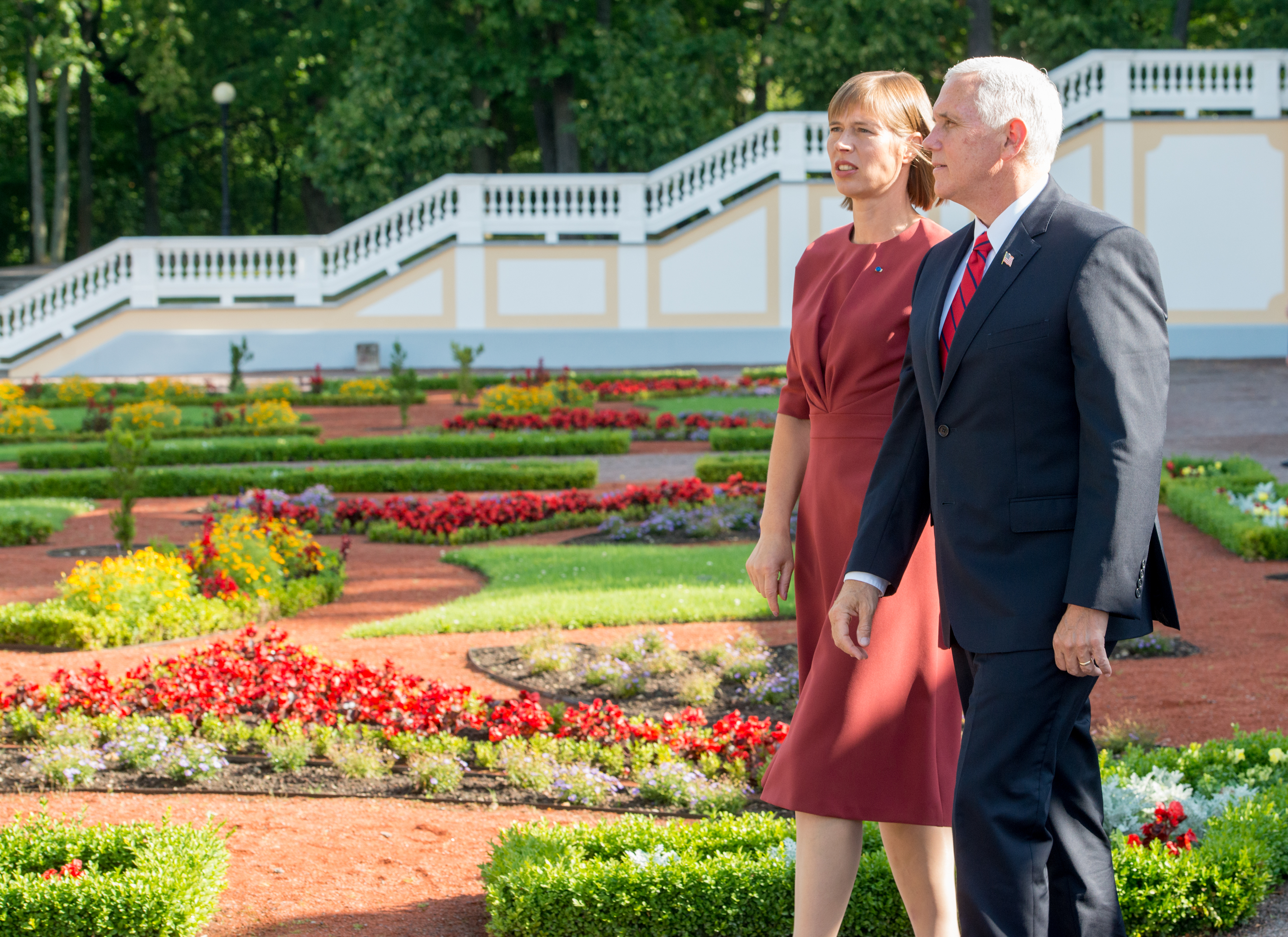
Kaljulaid with Mike Pence in July 2017

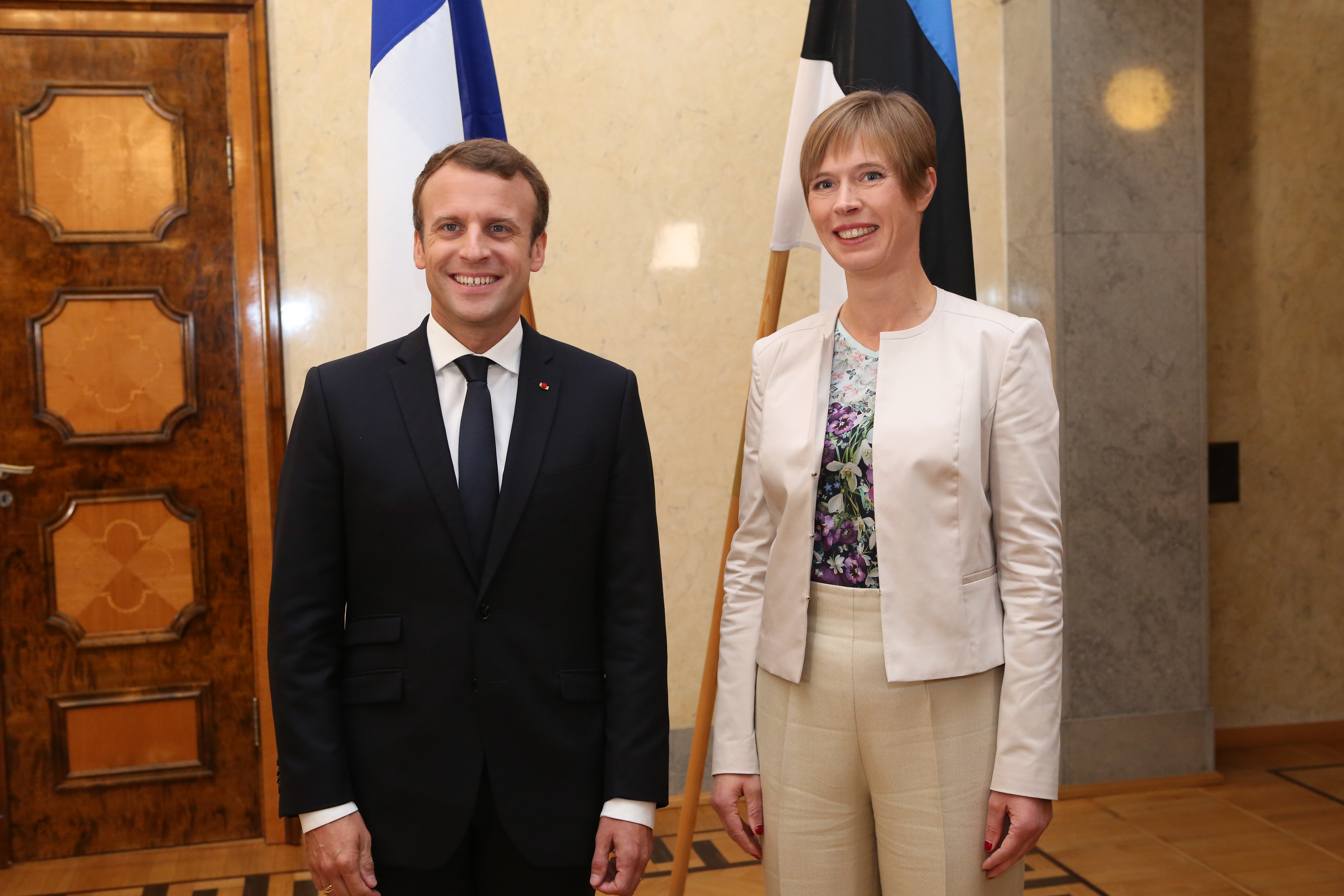
Kaljulaid and French President Emmanuel Macron in Tallinn, 28 September 2017

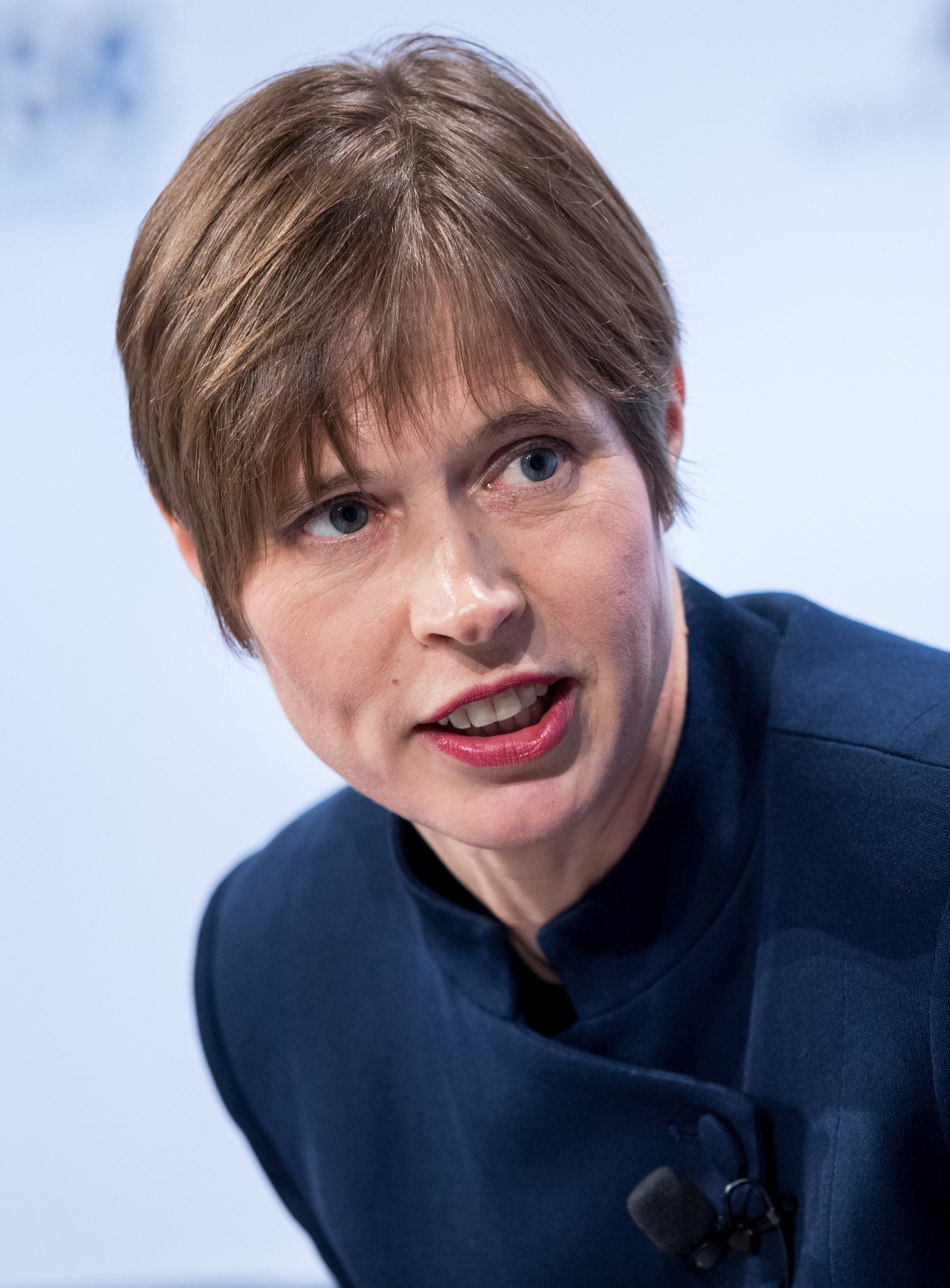
Kaljulaid in 2018

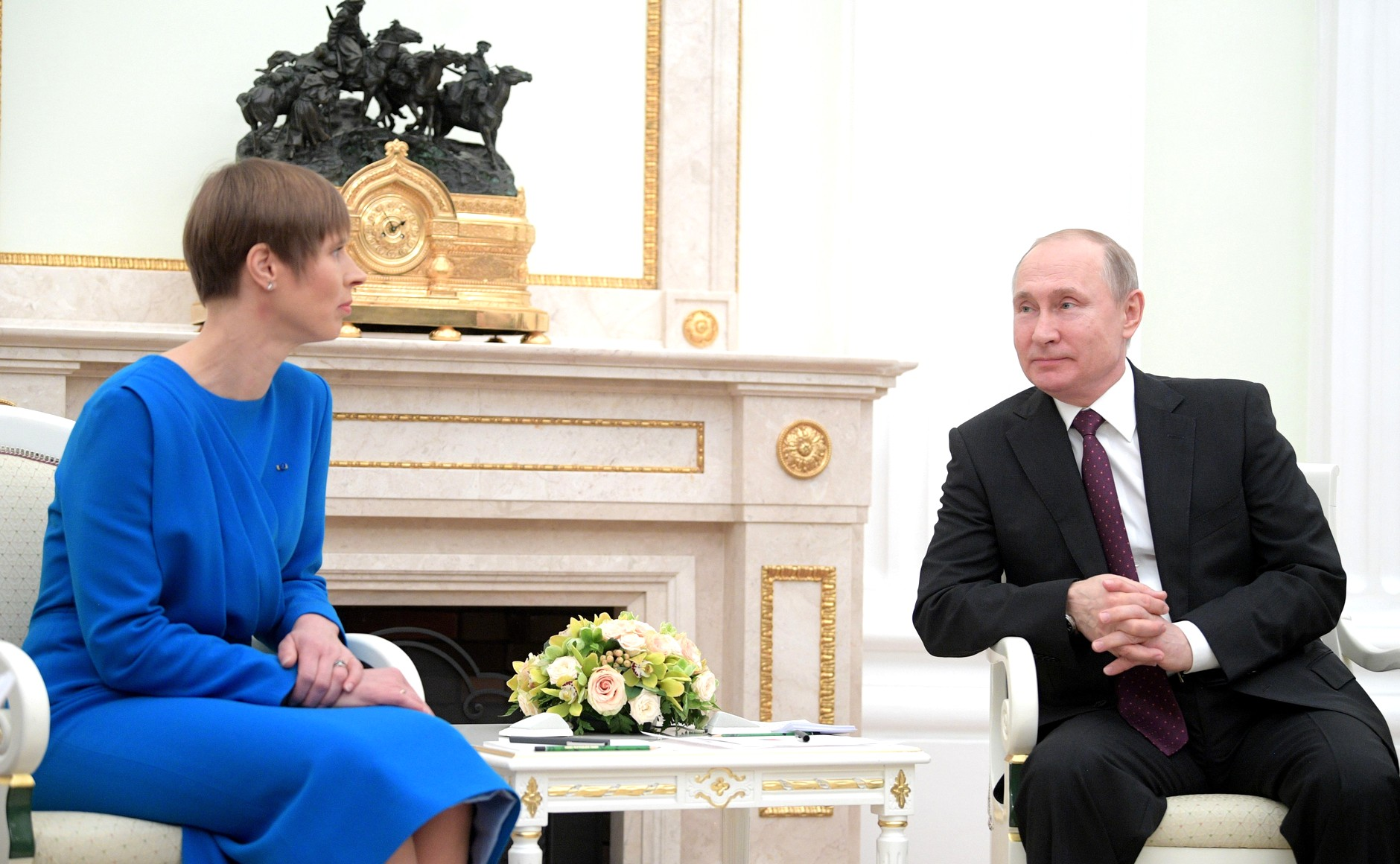
Kaljulaid and Russian President Vladimir Putin in Moscow, 18 April 2019

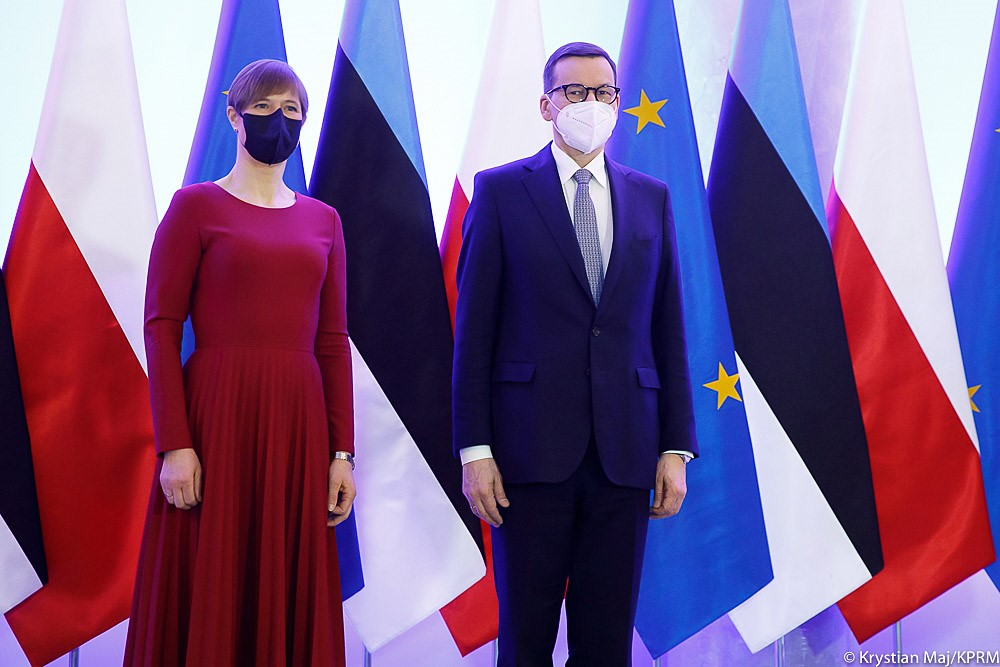
Kaljulaid and Polish Prime Minister Mateusz Morawiecki in Warsaw, 5 May 2021

=== President of Estonia ===
After several failed attempts to elect a new president in August and September 2016, a so-called "council of elders" of the Riigikogu, comprising the speaker, vice-speakers, and leaders of most parliamentary parties, asked Kaljulaid if she would be willing to stand for president. With her consent, the "council of elders" proposed her as the only potential presidential candidate to be put before the members of the Riigikogu on 3 October 2016. Her candidacy was officially registered on 30 September. Riigikogu Speaker Eiki Nestor said that Kaljulaid undoubtedly had the required 68 votes from the 101-member Riigikogu, but the exact number remained to be seen. Ultimately her candidacy was supported by 90 Riigikogu MPs. She won the elections by 81 votes with 17 abstainers and no votes against her; the parliamentary party that had publicly declared not to support her was EKRE which had only 7 votes.

Under the Constitution, the president is a ceremonial figure without even nominal executive power; the Constitution explicitly vests executive power in the Government. Nonetheless, Kaljulaid's election was seen as historic, as she was the first female head of state in the country's history.

The main objection raised repeatedly during her candidacy by media as well as politicians and street polls was her being relatively unknown, compared to the candidates that had participated in the campaign. She confronted the objection in her public letter and during several interviews by promising to become visible across the country, visiting different areas and talking to the people directly. In mid-October 2016, the first conducted survey showed Kaljulaid's approval rating at 73%.

In 2020, the Estonian government nominated Kaljulaid as its candidate to succeed Angel Gurría in the position of Secretary-General of the Organisation for Economic Co-operation and Development (OECD) for a five-year term. In January 2021, Kaljulaid announced that she had withdrawn her candidacy, citing consultations that led her to believe that accepting the position at the end of her first term as president amidst the COVID-19 pandemic in Estonia would "not be the best solution." She had just advanced to the second round of the interview process.

On 21 January 2021, the opposition Social Democratic Party announced that they would support Kaljulaid should she run for a second term in the 2021 Estonian presidential election. Had she been nominated by the government of Prime Minister Kaja Kallas as its presidential candidate in the election, this would have given her enough votes to be elected by the Riigikogu. By June 2021, it was stated that the government had "cooled" on the prospective of Kaljulaid serving a second term as president, finding her too polarizing. Nevertheless, Kaljulaid later confirmed that she would stand as a candidate for a second term in the election. However, she did not receive enough endorsements from MPs to be eligible; the Constitution requires presidential candidates to be nominated by at least 21 MPs in order to stand.

== Life after politics ==
After the end of her presidential term in 2021, Kaljulaid co-founded the President Kaljulaid Foundation, an NGO and think-tank for advancing democracy, empowering the vulnerable, and navigating the societal impact of digitalization. Among other things, the foundation has raised around €400 000 to help Ukrainian journalists and schools.

In 2021, Kaljulaid served on the advisory panel for the World Bank's World Development Report. Since 2022, she has been co-chairing – alongside Keith J. Krach – the nonpartisan Global Tech Security Commission to safeguard freedom from technological authoritarianism, which was jointly established by the Atlantic Council and the Krach Institute for Tech Diplomacy at Purdue University.

In 2023, United Nations Secretary General António Guterres appointed Kaljulaid as co-chair of the United Nations High-Level Panel on the Teaching Profession, alongside Paula-Mae Weekes.

In October 2024, she was elected president of the Estonian Olympic Committee. She was removed from the position in a vote of no confidence in April 2026.

== Other activities ==
=== Non-profit organizations ===
- Munich Security Conference, Member of the Advisory Council (since 2023)
- Atlantic Council, Member of the International Advisory Board
- Centre for European Reform (CER), Member of the Advisory Board
- Council of Women World Leaders, Member
- European Council on Foreign Relations (ECFR), Member of the Council
- GLOBSEC, Member of the International Advisory Council
- Yalta European Strategy (YES), Member of the Board
- Stockholm Environment Institute (SEI), Member of the Board

== Recognition ==
In 2017, Kaljulaid became the first Estonian to be featured in the Forbes magazine's list of The World's 100 Most Powerful Women, placed at 78th, and came twenty second among the most influential female political leaders.

== Honours ==
=== National honours ===
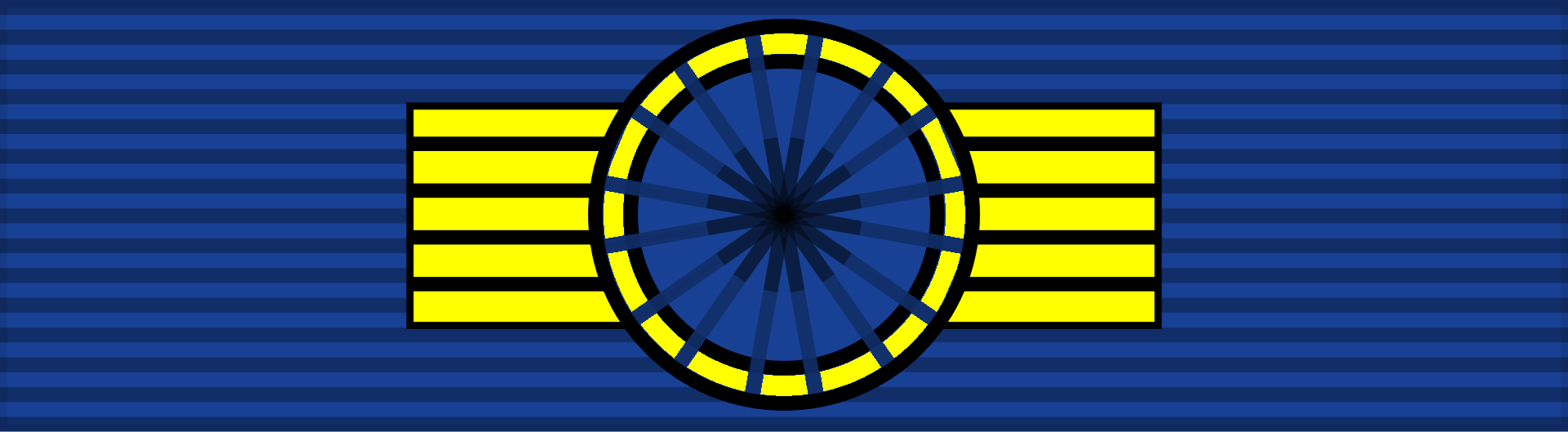
- Grand Master and Collar of the Order of the National Coat of Arms (10 October 2016)
- Grand Master of the Order of the Cross of Terra Mariana
- Grand Master of the Order of the White Star
- Grand Master of the Order of the Cross of the Eagle
- Grand Master of the Order of the Estonian Red Cross

=== Foreign honours ===
- Austria: Grand Star of the Decoration of Honour for Services to the Republic of Austria (26 May 2021)
- Finland: Grand Cross with Collar of the Order of the White Rose of Finland (7 March 2017)
- Germany Grand Cross 1st Class of the Order of Merit of the Federal Republic of Germany (15 March 2023)
- Italy: Knight Grand Cross with Collar of the Order of Merit of the Italian Republic (5 June 2018)
- Latvia: Commander Grand Cross with Chain of the Order of the Three Stars (8 April 2019)
- Netherlands: Grand Cross of the Order of the Netherlands Lion (12 June 2018)
- Portugal: Grand Collar of the Order of Prince Henry (16 April 2019)
- Romania: Collar of the Order of the Star of Romania (16 June 2021)
- Slovenia: Recipient of the Order for Exceptional Merits (2 September 2019)
- Ukraine: First Class of the Order of Prince Yaroslav the Wise, 1st class (2021)

== Awards ==
- In 2009, European Movement Estonia awarded Kaljulaid with the European of the Year title.
- In 2014, the Open Estonia Foundation awarded her the Award of Unity for her analyses and comments explaining the function of European Union for Estonian audiences.
- In 2020, the Estonian LGBT Association awarded her the Rainbow Hero Award (vikerkaarekangelase auhind), for her public support of the gay community in Estonia.
- In 2020, the University of Tartu awarded her the Johan Skytte Medal.

== Personal life ==
Kaljulaid has a daughter and a son from her first marriage. She is also a grandmother of three. Kaljulaid's second husband is Georgi-Rene Maksimovski; they have two sons. Kaljulaid's half-brother, Raimond Kaljulaid, is a politician and member of parliament.

Besides Estonian, Kaljulaid is fluent in English, Finnish, French and to a certain extent, Russian.

== See also ==
- List of official overseas trips made by Kersti Kaljulaid
- 2016 Estonian presidential election
- Raimond Kaljulaid

Political offices
Preceded by Toomas Hendrik Ilves	President of Estonia; 2016–2021	Succeeded by Alar Karis
