= Chromia (disambiguation) =

Chromia may refer to:

- Chromia, a figure in Greek mythology
- Chromium(III) oxide, a chemical compound
- Chromia (Transformers), a Transformers character
- Chromia, a blockchain developed by ChromaWay
