= Kaljulaid =

Family name

Kaljulaid (pronounced [ˈkɑljulɑi̯t]) is an Estonian surname with the literal meaning of "cliff islet" (compound noun of kalju "cliff", "rock") and laid ("islet", "holm").

Notable people with the surname include:

- Kersti Kaljulaid (born 1969), Estonian politician
- Raimond Kaljulaid (born 1982), Estonian politician
