= Colored Coins =

Protocol for use with Bitcoin transactions

- Developers: Chromaway Coinprism; CoinSciences Colu
- Release: 2012
- Written in: C++
- Engine: Bitcoin (software)
- Operating system: Cross-platform
- Platform: CCP, Chromaway EPOBC, Colu’s Colored Coin Protocol
- License: Open-source licenses
- Website: www.coloredcoins.org

Colored Coins is an open-source protocol that allows users to represent and manipulate immutable digital resources on top of Bitcoin transactions. They are a class of methods for representing and maintaining real-world assets on the Bitcoin blockchain, which may be used to establish asset ownership. Colored coins are bitcoins with a mark on them that specifies what they may be used for. Colored coins have also been considered a precursor to NFTs.

Although bitcoins are fungible on the protocol level, they can be marked to be distinguished from other bitcoins. These marked coins have specific features that correspond to physical assets like vehicles and stocks, and owners may use them to establish their ownership of physical assets. Colored coins aim to lower transaction costs and complexity so that an asset's owner may transfer ownership as quickly as a Bitcoin transaction.

Colored coins are commonly referred to as meta coins because this imaginative coloring is the addition of metadata. This enables a portion of a digital representation of a physical item to be encoded into a Bitcoin address. The value of the colored coins is independent of the current prices of the bitcoin; instead, it is determined by the value of the underlying actual asset/service and the issuer's desire and capacity to redeem the colored coins in return for the equivalent actual asset or service.

== History ==
Colored coins arose due to the necessity to generate new tokens and move assets on the Bitcoin network. These tokens can be used to represent any asset in the world, including equities, commodities, real estate, fiat currency, and even other cryptocurrencies.

Yoni Assia, the CEO of eToro, was the first to suggest Colored coins in an article published on March 27, 2012. In the article titled bitcoin 2.X (aka Colored bitcoin), Assia claimed that the initial specifications that bitcoins transmitted using the "Genesis Transaction" protocol are recognizable, distinctive, and trackable on the ledger. The idea was growing, and on forums such as Bitcointalk, the concept of colored coins started to take form and gain traction. This culminated in Meni Rosenfeld releasing a whitepaper detailing the colored currencies on December 4, 2012.

The next year, in 2013, Assia collaborated with Buterin and five others, Lior Hakim, and Meni Rosenfeld, Amos Meiri, Alex Mizrahi and Rotem Lev to write Color Coins — BitcoinX, which explored the potential possibilities of colored coins.

In 2013, the New Scientist magazine first acknowledged Colored Coins where Meiri describes for the first time the actual issuance of a share or a gold bar on the blockchain. In 2014, Colu was the first company to raise venture capital money to develop the Colored Coins protocol.

== Development ==
Colored coins originated as an afterthought by Bitcoin miners. The blockchain's data space had been utilized to encode numerous metadata values. This unexpected data caused processing issues, causing the network to slow down. The Bitcoin team fixed the problem by including a 40-byte area for storing data as a transaction, as well as an encrypted ledger of transactions and information about the coin's genesis.

While bitcoin was developed to be a cryptocurrency, its scripting language makes it possible to associate metadata with individual transactions. By precisely tracing the origin of a particular bitcoin, it is possible to distinguish a group of bitcoins from the others, a process known as bitcoin coloring (a term that served as a basis to the name of the Colored Coins protocol).

Through the oversight of an issuing agent or a public agreement, special properties can be associated with colored bitcoins, giving them value beyond the currency's value. One way of looking at this is from the abstraction that there are two distinct layers on top of bitcoin: the lower layer referring to the transaction network based on cryptographic technology and an upper layer that constitutes a distribution network of values encapsulated in the design of colored coins.

Due to the fact that colored coins are implemented on top of the Bitcoin infrastructure, allow atomic transactions (exchanged for each other in a single transaction) and can be transferred without the involvement of a third party, they enable the decentralized exchange of items that would not be possible through traditional means.

To create colored coins, "colored" addresses must be created and stored in "colored" wallets controlled by color-aware clients such as Coinprism, Coloredcoins, through Colu, or CoinSpark. The "coloring" process is an abstract idea that indicates an asset description, some general instructions symbol, and a unique hash associated with the Bitcoin addresses.

In 2013, Flavien Charlon, the CEO of Coinprism, developed a Colored Coin Protocol that permitted the generation of colored currencies by employing specified settings in transaction inputs and outputs. This was Bitcoin's first working Colored Coin Protocol. This protocol, also known as the Open Assets Protocol, is open source and may be integrated into existing systems by anyone.

On July 3, 2014, ChromaWay developed the Enhanced Padded-Order-Based Coloring protocol (EPOBC), which simplified the process of manufacturing colored coins for developers, and was one of the first to employ Bitcoin Script's new OP RETURN function.

In January 2014, Colu created the ColoredCoins platforms and Colored Coins protocol allowing users to build digital assets on top of the Bitcoin blockchain using the Bitcoin 2.0 protocol. In 2016, Colu announced integration to Lightning Network expanding its Bitcoin L2 capabilities.

== Layers of Colored Coins ==
Colored coin functions by adding a 4th layer to the Bitcoin blockchain.

- 1st Layer: Network
- 2nd Layer: Consensus
- 3rd Layer: Transaction
- 4th Layer: Watermark (color)

Before ERC token standards were created, the concept of using tokens to represent and monitor real-world items existed. Colored coins were the original notion for representing assets on the blockchain. They are not widely used because the transaction structure required to represent colored coins relies on unspent transaction outputs, which Ethereum-based blockchain systems do not support. The primary concept is to add an attribute (the color) to native transactions that specify the asset it symbolizes. For example, for the Bitcoin blockchain, each Satoshi (the lowest potential value of Bitcoin) might represent a separate item. This notion is mostly used to monitor ownership of tokens and, by extension, assets. There is promise in using colored coins as an effective way of tracing in production situations since the transactions can be merged or divided into new transactions and the color can be readily altered after each transaction. Finally, current tools, like as blockchain explorers, make it simple to view and analyze transactions.

The nature of colored coins makes them the first non-fungible tokens to be created on the Bitcoin blockchain, albeit with limited features. Colored coins are transferrable in what is known as atomic transactions. Atomic transactions are transactions that permit the direct peer-to-peer exchange of one token for another in a single transaction. In this way, colored coins allow traditional assets to be decentralized.

== Transactions ==
Colored coin uses an open-source, decentralized peer-to-peer transaction protocol built on top of WEB 2.0. Despite being created to be a protocol for monetary transactions, one of the Bitcoin's advantages is a secure transaction protocol not controlled by a central authority. This is possible through the use of Blockchain, which maintains track of all Bitcoin transactions worldwide.

A transaction consists of:

- A set of inputs such that each input has (a) a Transaction Hash and Output Index of a previous transaction carried out on that bitcoin and (b) a digital signature that serves as cryptographic proof that that input address authorizes the transaction.
- An output set such that each output has (a) the bitcoin value to be transferred to that output and (b) a script that maps a single address to that output.

== Staining and transferring ==
The manipulation of colored coins can be performed through several algorithms, which create a set of rules to be applied to the inputs and outputs of Bitcoin transactions:

1. At a given moment, a digital resource is associated with the output of a Bitcoin transaction, called Genesis Transactions. The output of this transaction (currency) belongs to the initial owner recorded in the system (in a case of a jewelry store associating its jewelry with digital resources, the newly colored coins will belong to the store).
2. When the resource is transferred or sold, the currency that belongs to the previous owner is consumed, while a new colored currency is created at the outgoing address of the transfer transaction.
3. When it is necessary to identify the owner of a coin, it is enough to evaluate the transaction history of that coin from its genesis transaction to the last transaction with unconsumed output. The Bitcoin blockchain has tracking of the public keys associated with each address, such that the owner of the coin can prove ownership by sending a message with the private key associated with that address.

Among these algorithms, the best known of them is the EPOBC. The EPOBC algorithm colors the coins by inserting a mark in the nSequence field of the first input of the transaction. The nSequence field is always present in Bitcoin transactions, but it is not used, so it does not generate an overhead for the coloring process. Examples of companies driving the EPOBC are ChromaWallet, Cuber, LHV and Funderbeam.

=== Genesis transactions ===
To issue new colors, it is necessary to release coins of that color through genesis transactions. In general, there are two cases to consider about genesis transactions:

- Non-reissuable colors: In this case, the transaction inputs are irrelevant to the algorithm, since once the transaction is executed, the coin issuer has no power over them. So all that matters is the genesis transaction itself.
- Reissuable colors: In this scenario, the issuer must choose a secure address to be the “Issuing Address” and set transaction entry 0 to come from that address. In a second moment, the issuer will be able to issue new units of that color through genesis transactions with the same secure address. An address can only be associated with a single color. Once an address emits a reissuable color, it will no longer be able to participate in coloring coins of other colors, not even non-reissuable colors.

=== Transfer transactions ===
Transfer transactions are used to send colored coins from one address to another. It is also possible to transfer coins of multiple colors in a single transfer transaction. Tagging-based coloring is the most well-known algorithm for this operation.

If colored coins are used as input for transactions that do not follow the transfer protocol, the value associated with their color is lost. Furthermore, their value can also be lost in a malformed transaction.

There are one or more colored inputs in a transfer transaction. Inputs do not need to be of the same color, e.g. "gold" and "silver" can be transferred within one transaction, which is beneficial for peer-to-peer trade. The order of inputs and outputs within a transaction, as it is used for non-ambiguous decoding.

=== Alternative coloring algorithms ===
Determining a way to transfer colored coins from one Bitcoin address to another is the most complex part of the colored coins protocol. For transactions with only one input and one output, it is easy to determine that the color of the output coins is the same color that was received by the input address, since a Bitcoin address can only handle a single color value. However, in transactions with multiple inputs and outputs, determining which colored coins of inputs correspond to which outputs become a more complex task. For that, there are several algorithms that propose to solve this problem, each one with its peculiarities.

- Order based coloring is the first and simplest coloring algorithm. An intuitive way to understand this algorithm is to consider that the transaction has a width proportional to its total input amount. On the left side there are inputs, each a width proportional to its value, on the right side there are outputs with values proportional to their bitcoin values. Assume, then, that colored water flows in a straight line from left to right. The color of an outlet will be the color of the water arriving at it, or colorless if multiple-color coins arrive at that outlet. A single Bitcoin address cannot handle coins of different colors.
- Padded order based coloring is a slightly more complex algorithm than the OBC (Order based coloring) algorithm. In essence, the algorithm has the same principle as the OBC, however, treating each output as containing a pad of a certain number of colorless bitcoins, with the colored coins following them.

== Applications ==
The Bitcoin network's decentralized nature indicates that its security does not need dependence on trusted parties and that its players may operate anonymously provided adequate safeguards are adopted. Colored Coins protocols adoption enables the integration of decentralized stock exchanges and other financial functionality into Bitcoin such as certifying credentials (like academic certificates), or establishing the existence of digital documents.

- Smart property: For example, a product rental company can release a colored coin to represent their products, such as a car. Through an application, the company could configure a control message that would send a message signed by the private key that currently has the colored coin. In this way, its users could transfer the vehicle's digital key to each other, by transferring the currency. This protocol feature may be used in land management by indicating ownership of a piece of land with a single or several tokens. The token's information may be used to maintain public registry parameters such as size, GPS locations, year created, and so on. The land administrator may encrypt ownership details such as titles or identification so that only individuals with the right private key can see the information. Anyone with an internet connection can publicly verify and trace the ownership of each token using block explorer software.
- Issue of shares: A company can issue its shares through colored coins, taking advantage of the Bitcoin infrastructure to manage activities such as voting, exchange and payment of dividends. Colored coins may also be used to form Distributed Collaborative Organizations (DCOs) and Decentralized Autonomous Organizations (DAOs), which are acting as virtual corporations with shareholders. In such cases, the blockchain may assist in keeping track of a company's ownership structure as well as creating and distributing DCO shares in a transparent and safe manner. Examples: community currency or corporate currency, deposit representation, access and subscription services.
- Issue of coupons: A company can issue promotional coupons or loyalty points among its customers in the form of colored coins.
- Digital collectibles: Decentralized management of digital resources. Similar to how collectors acquire and sell paintings, colored coins enable managing digital resources in a similar way, such as e-books, music, digital games and software, guaranteeing ownership of the resource to the owner of the coin.

As long as the provider's identity is protected by the legal framework, colored coins may be used to transfer any digitally transferable right. The circulation is based on a cryptographic signature. The contract and any payments linked to it are recorded on the blockchain using a unique cryptographic key that identifies the rightful owner of the currency. Parties may use an alias to sign up for the protocol under legally permissible circumstances. In reality, the secret cryptographic key enables the system to validate subscribers' digital identities without disclosing any personal information.

Private key holders might then transfer the asset directly to other persons or corporations through a public blockchain.

Users may trade and manage all asset classes in a somewhat decentralized framework with a minute amount of colored Bitcoin, according to marketing literature, rather than needing to send hundreds or even thousands of bitcoins in return for an item or service.

- Deterministic contracts: A person or company can issue contracts by pre-scheduling a payment, such as stock options.
- Bonds: A special case of a deterministic contract, bonds can be issued with a down payment amount and an installment schedule in bitcoin, another currency or commodity.
- Decentralized digital representation of physical resources: It means tying physical resources, such as physical objects, commodities, or traditional currencies, to digital resources and proving ownership of those objects in that way. NFT tokens use this approach, selling ownership of artworks and even living properties.

== Сolored coin wallet ==
Colored coins can be handled through wallets in the same manner as Bitcoin monetary resources can be managed through bitcoin wallets. Wallets are used to manage the addresses associated with each pair of keys (public and private) of a Bitcoin user, as well as the transactions associated with their set of addresses. Rather than dealing with cryptocurrencies, colored coin wallets add a layer of abstraction, managing digital assets, such as stocks, altcoins, which are created on the Blockchain, intellectual property and other resources.

While bitcoin wallets are required to use a unique Bitcoin address for each transaction, colored coin wallets frequently reuse their addresses in order to re-issue coins of the same color.

To issue colored coins, colored addresses must be generated and stored in colored wallets administered by a color-aware client such as Colu or Coinprism.

== Protocol implementation ==
Protocol implementations are associated with wallet software, so that the end user does not have to be concerned about transaction structuring or manual resource manipulation. There is, however, some concern about the interoperability of the existing implementations, as colored coins transactions are operationalized using the variety of different algorithms. Transactions between unsupported wallets may result in the loss of currency coloring features.

Colored coins require a unified wallet that can distinguish between items other than bitcoins. In June 2015, a Torrent-based version of Colored Coins was developed by Colu to cover the protocol's use while Bitcoin has not yet been widely adopted by the market. Making the protocol compatible amongst different Bitcoin implementations is one approach to increase the usage of Bitcoin for digital asset management.

== Legal aspects ==
A smart property or an item with an off-chain identifier that is transferred via blockchain remains subject to legal interpretation. Colored coins and other virtual currency are presently not recognized as evidence of ownership by any government agency in the United States. For financial institutions, the lack of an identifiable identity across on-and off-chain settings is still a barrier.

There's a legal challenge with regard to the transfer of common stock ownership using blockchain. Due to the fact that the rights to receive notifications, vote, receive dividends, and exercise appraisal rights are restricted to registered owners, establishing ownership is likely even more critical for blockchain stock.

Due to the extralegal nature of colored coin transactions such as NFTs, they frequently result in an informal exchange of ownership over the item with no legal basis for enforcement, frequently conferring nothing more than usage as a status symbol.

== Limitations ==
- As virtual tokens colored coins cannot compel the real world to meet the obligations made when they were issued. They can represent something external, in the actual world, such as a corporate action or debt repayment obligation. This suggests that they are issued by a person or entity, which carries some level of risk. That the issuer does not comply with its related obligations or there may even be fraud and that those currencies may not represent anything actual.
- They are unable to prevent a user from changing the underlying cryptocurrency in a way that destroys the extra information. Using virtual tokens in a transaction that does not conform with the rules of colored currencies (stricter than the rules of blockchain transactions and not mandated by it) destroys the additional meaning, leaving only the token’s monetary worth on the blockchain.
- It is impossible to store the semantics of information indicating what a token represents. For instance, the blockchain can record the number of concert tickets that have been issued and the addresses of their owners, but it cannot encode the fact that they represent allowed access to a specific concert at a specific time. Metadata storage and processing require an external system, such as Open-Transactions. Open-Transactions is a free software library that implements cryptographically secure financial transactions using financial cryptographic primitives. It can be utilized to issue stocks, pay dividends, purchase and sell shares, etc.
- The speed of transactions and the capabilities of the smart contract procedures utilized by virtual tokens are equivalent to those of the blockchain they are based on.
- Due to the nature of the Bitcoin host network, adding an additional layer is neither simple nor scalable. Additionally, it inherits all of the information security and safety concerns of the host blockchain. Developing a comprehensive protocol that incorporates asset issuance and native tracking may be a more rigorous and scalable method for creating a blockchain-based asset-tracking system.

== Concerns ==
Opposition to the use of Colored Coins for the treatment of abstracted resources on Bitcoin mainly originates in the financial and banking sectors. It is argued that the proof-of-work blockchain-based security system cannot be exported to a regulated financial resolution environment. As a result, there is no legal framework for Colored Coins' transactions. Finally, there are some regulatory concerns with the coin coloring method. According to institutions that criticize the decentralized transaction system, the legal effect of an individual or entity transferring ownership of a given object to another individual or entity through Bitcoin abstractions is still uncertain.

== See also ==
- Bitcoin
- Blockchain
- Digital currencies
- Non-fungible token
- Bitcoin network
- Smart contract
- Altcoins
