= Luminor Bank =

Company based in Estonia

Luminor Bank AS
- Logo used since 2017

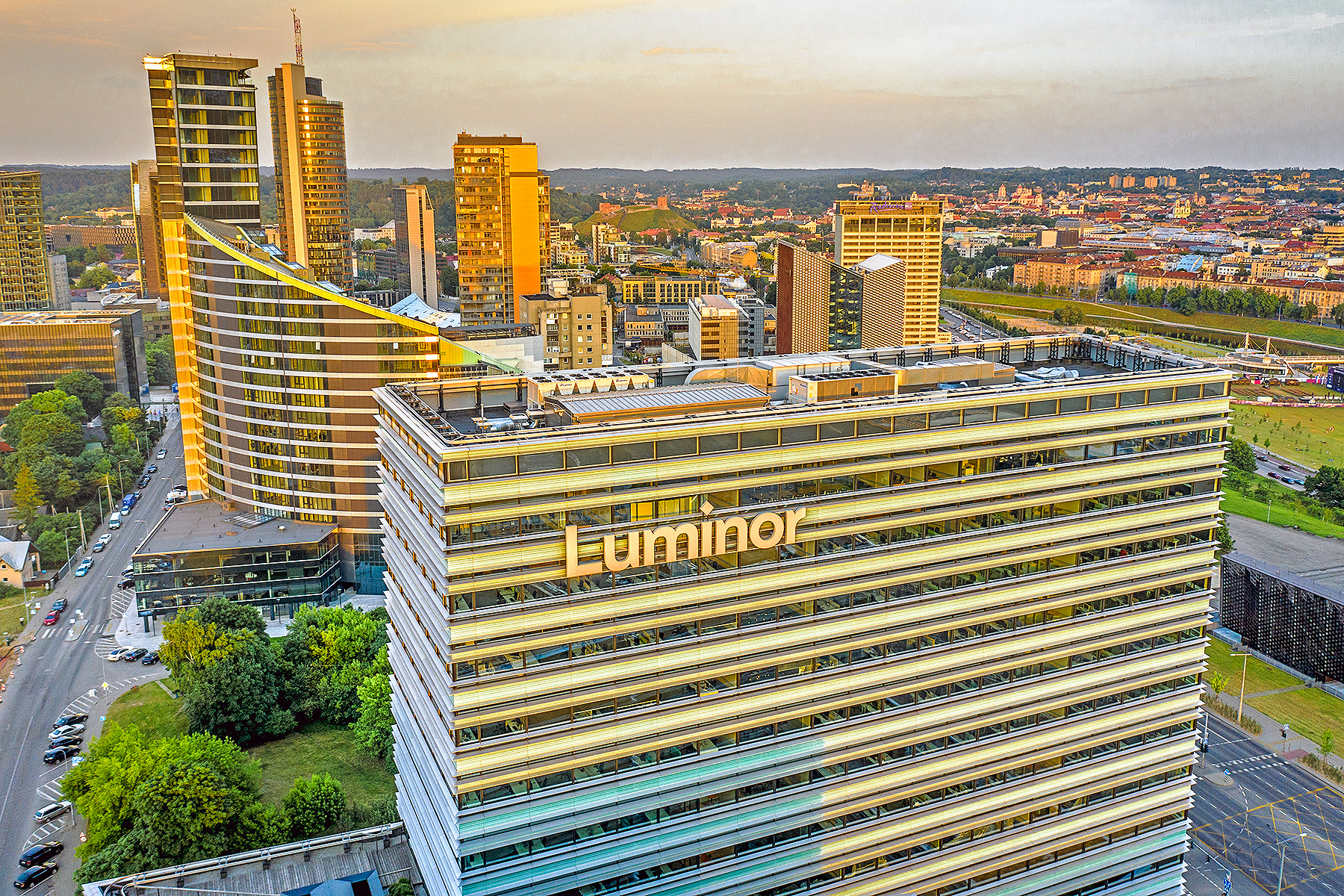
- Lithuanian Luminor headquarters in Vilnius CBD
- Trade name: Luminor
- Industry: Finance
- Predecessors: Branches of Nordea and DNB in Estonia, Latvia, and Lithuania
- Founded: 2017; 9 years ago in Tallinn, Estonia
- Headquarters: Tallinn, Estonia
- Area served: Estonia; Latvia; Lithuania
- Key people: Wojciech Sass (CEO); Nils Melngailis (Chairman)
- Services: Retail banking
- Operating income: €632.6 million(2024)
- Net income: €255.7 million(2024)
- Total assets: €16.336 billion (Q1 2026)
- Owner: Blackstone Group (80.05%); DNB (19.95%)
- Number of employees: 3,000 (2018)
- Website: luminor.ee

Luminor Bank AS is a bank headquartered in Tallinn, Estonia, with branches in Latvia and Lithuania. As of 2019 it was the third-largest bank in the Baltics, with a deposit market share of 16% and lending market share of 22%.

== Overview ==
Luminor was founded in August 2017 on the basis of the Baltic operations of Nordea and DNB. Luminor took over 930,000 of DNB's former customers and 350,000 of Nordea former customers. The merger was completed on 1 January 2019.

Originally, Nordea owned 56.5% and DNB owned 43.5% of Luminor. In September 2018, it was announced that 60 percent of Luminor's shares would be sold to a consortium led by Blackstone Group. The transaction was approved by the European Commission in January 2019, and completed in September 2019. After the transaction, Nordea and DNB owned stakes of 20 percent each. Blackstone and Nordea have agreed that Blackstone would also purchase Nordea's remaining 20% in Luminor. In December 2021 Blackstone acquired 8.4% of Nordea’s shares and in September 2022 bought the remaining 11.6%.

As of 2019, the CEO of Luminor was Peter Bosek and the chairman of the supervisory board was Nils Melngailis. As of 2018, Luminor had 3,000 employees. In February 2019, the bank announced that, due to consolidation, it would reduce its staff by 130 employees in Estonia, 250 employees in Latvia, and 420 employees in Lithuania. The bank also closed 26 of their 61 customer service centers in the Baltic states in 2019.

Luminor has been designated in 2017 as a Significant Institution under the criteria of European Banking Supervision, and as a consequence is directly supervised by the European Central Bank. In 2019, with 12.9 billion EUR, Luminor issued the highest total amount of loans in Estonia.

In June 2024, it was reported that both OTP Bank and UniCredit were bidding to acquire control of Luminor from the Blackstone Group. On 20 July 2026, OTP Bank announced the signature of an agreement to acquire Luminor Bank.

== See also ==
- List of banks in Estonia
- List of banks in the euro area
