= LHV Pank =

Estonian banking and financial services company

- Company type: Public company
- Traded as: Nasdaq Baltic: LHV1T
- ISIN: EE3100102203
- Industry: Banking, Financial services
- Founded: 1999
- Founders: Rain Lõhmus, Tõnis Haavel & Andres Viisemann
- Headquarters: Tallinn, Estonia
- Key people: Kadri Kiisel Chairman of the Management Board; Indrek Nuume Member of the Management Board / Head of Private and Business Banking; Meelis Paakspuu Member of the Management Board of LHV Bank / Chief Financial Officer
- Products: Retail, commercial and private banking
- Net income: ▲€39.8 million (2020)
- Number of employees: 500 (2020)
- Website: www.lhv.ee/en/

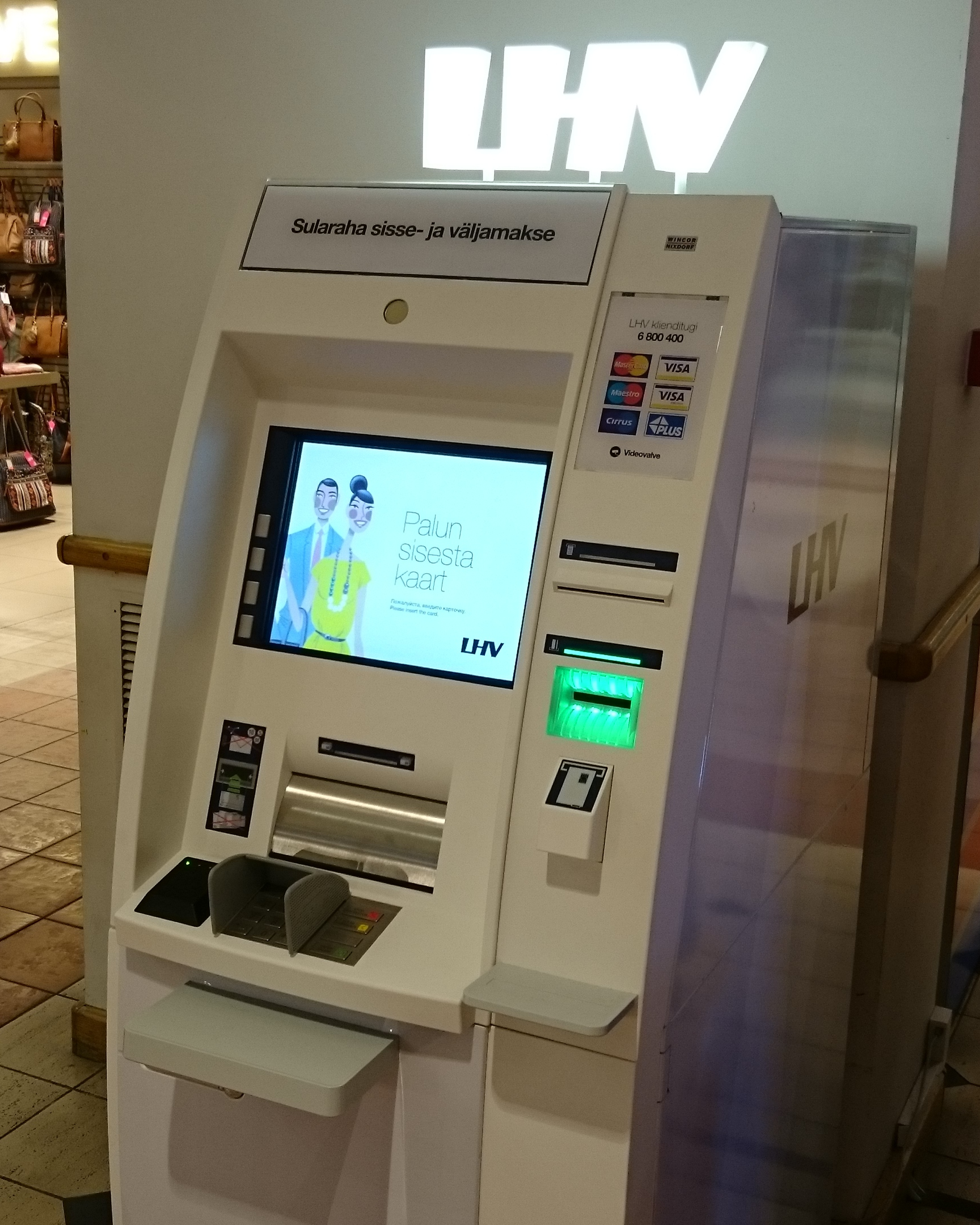
LHV Pank's ATM installed at Kristiine Centre in August 2015.

LHV Pank (originally Lõhmus, Haavel & Viisemann) is an Estonian banking and financial services company headquartered in Tallinn. It is a subsidiary of AS LHV Group, a public company listed on the Nasdaq Tallinn Stock Exchange. The bank's clients include private individuals, small and medium-sized companies and institutional investors. LHV Pank is the third largest bank in Estonia. LHV has branch offices in Tallinn, Tartu and Pärnu. LHV Pank employs over 800 people. More than 350 000 clients use the bank's services. LHV Pank is one of the largest brokers on NASDAQ OMX Baltic stock exchanges and the largest broker for Baltic retail investors in international markets.

LHV Pank was fully cash-free—operating only with electronic transfers and card payments—until August 2015, when they opened their first ten Automated teller machine (nine in Tallinn and one in Tartu).

LHV Pank has been identified as a partner in the virtual e-residency of Estonia program, enabling e-residents to open a bank account in Estonia.

Starting November 2018, the bank decided to charge all non-residents and their controlled companies (which includes e-residents and their companies) €10 in case of EU/EEA residents or €20 of others monthly, citing the need for extra financial and anti-laundering control.

LHV has been designated in 2022 as a Significant Institution under the criteria of European Banking Supervision, and as a consequence is directly supervised by the European Central Bank. This designation is based on a quantitative assessment that concluded on the bank's national economic importance vis-à-vis Estonia's GDP.

== History ==
LHV Pank was founded on 9 February 1999 as the investment firm Lõhmus, Haavel & Viisemann. In its early years, the firm focused on investment services, launching the lhvdirect.com portal in 2000 and creating the first LHV pension funds in 2002. During this period, the company expanded its footprint across the Baltic region, opening branches in Riga (2002) and Vilnius (2005).

In 2007, the company rebranded, adopting the LHV logo and name. A significant transition occurred on 6 May 2009, when the company was granted a full banking license and officially became AS LHV Pank. Following this, the bank expanded into traditional commercial banking, launching deposit and loan products and opening a branch in Helsinki, Finland, in 2010.

Between 2011 and 2014, the bank modernized its retail offering by issuing bank cards, launching a mobile app, and introducing hire-purchase services through the subsidiary LHV Finance. In 2014, the bank partnered with ChromaWay to develop "Cuber," a blockchain-based pilot for digital certificates of deposit, making it one of the first traditional banks to experiment with distributed ledger technology.

LHV remained a fully digital, cash-free operation until August 2015, when it established its first network of ten ATMs in Tallinn and Tartu. By 2021, the bank shifted its focus toward sustainability, announcing a policy to cease financing the purchase of new diesel passenger cars after 2030.

== See also ==
- List of banks in Estonia
- List of banks in the euro area
