= Global Tech Security Commission =

The Global Tech Security Commission (GTSC) operates under a congressional charter and was established on May 25, 2022. The GTSC's primary mission revolves around developing a global technology security strategy to counter the encroachment of technological authoritarianism. This aims to unify like-minded nations, leverage the private sector's capabilities and resources, and establish a global network dedicated to the development, safeguarding, and promotion of trusted technologies.

The Commission is co-chaired by former U.S. Under Secretary of State Keith Krach, chairman and co-founder of the Krach Institute for Tech Diplomacy at Purdue and Kersti Kaljulaid, former president of the Republic of Estonia. Sens. Tom Cotton (R-AR), Joni Ernst (R-IA), Bill Hagerty (R-TN), Jeanne Shaheen (D-NH), Mark Warner (D-VA) and Todd Young (R-IN), and Reps. Josh Gottheimer (D-NJ 5th District), Ro Khanna (D-CA-17), Raja Krishnamoorthi (D-IL 8th District), Mike McCaul (R-TX 10th District), Ritchie Torres (D-NY 15th District), Lori Trahan (D-MA 3rd District), Michael Waltz (R-FL 6th District) and Robert D. Hormats, Fmr. Under Secretary of State for Economic Growth Energy and the Environment, Lt. Gen. H. R. McMaster, 26th U.S. National Security Advisor, Lieutenant General U.S. Army (ret.) and Alex Wong, Vice Chair, U.S.-China Economic and Security Review Commission serve as honorary co-chairs.

The Commission develops strategies for each White House-designated national security tech sector and then integrates them into an overarching global tech security strategy. The Commission includes allied country commissioners, twelve tech commissioners, and over 20 strategy commissioners.

The commission supports White House efforts in uniting its transatlantic and Indo-Pacific allies and partners across a range of critical technology issues and such multinational efforts as the Indo-Pacific Economic Framework and Future of the Internet Declaration.

The Global Tech Security Commission garners support from government entities, including the Department of Commerce, the Department of State, and the National Security Council (NSC).
