= List of international presidential trips made by Kersti Kaljulaid =

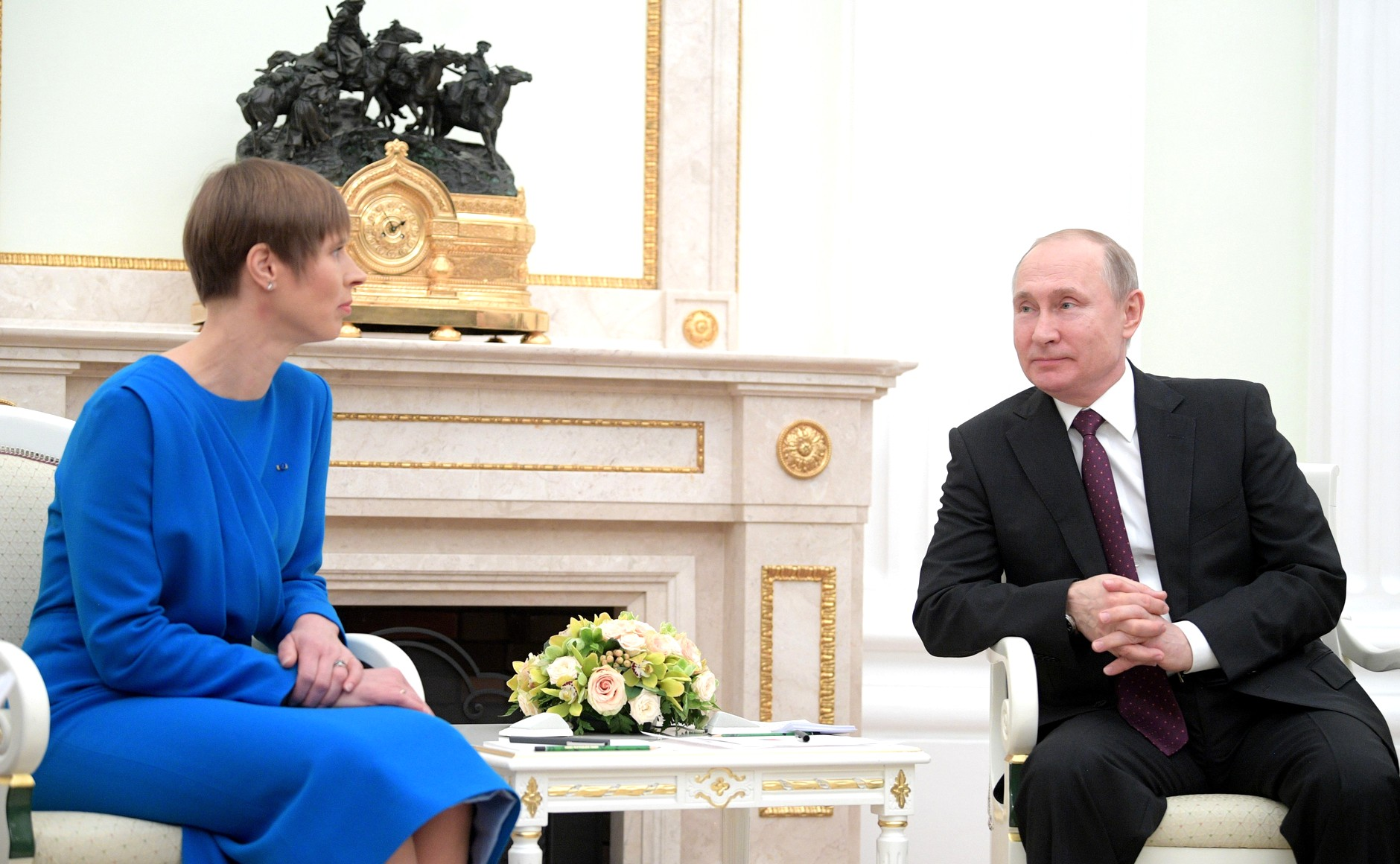
Kaljulaid with Russian President Vladimir Putin.

This is a list of official overseas trips made by Kersti Kaljulaid, the 5th President of Estonia. On many of her overseas visits, she has been accompanied by Georgi–Rene Maksimovski, who is her husband and concurrently the First Gentleman of Estonia.

== List of visits ==
Number of visits per country where President Kaljulaid has travelled:

- One: Afghanistan, Algeria, Antarctica, United Arab Emirates, Argentina, Armenia, Australia, Benin, Bulgaria, Chile, China, Denmark, Fiji, Greece, Iceland, Kenya, Kuwait, Luxembourg, Netherlands, New Zealand, Russia, Rwanda, Saint Kitts and Nevis, Senegal, Singapore, Spain, Vanuatu and the United Kingdom
- Two: Ethiopia, Georgia, Japan, Norway, Republic of Korea, Slovakia, Slovenia and Switzerland
- Three: Romania, Sweden and United Kingdom
- Four: Lithuania
- Five: Ukraine
- Six: Belgium, Italy and Poland
- Eight: Latvia
- Nine: France
- Ten: Finland
- Twelve: United States
- Thirteen: Germany

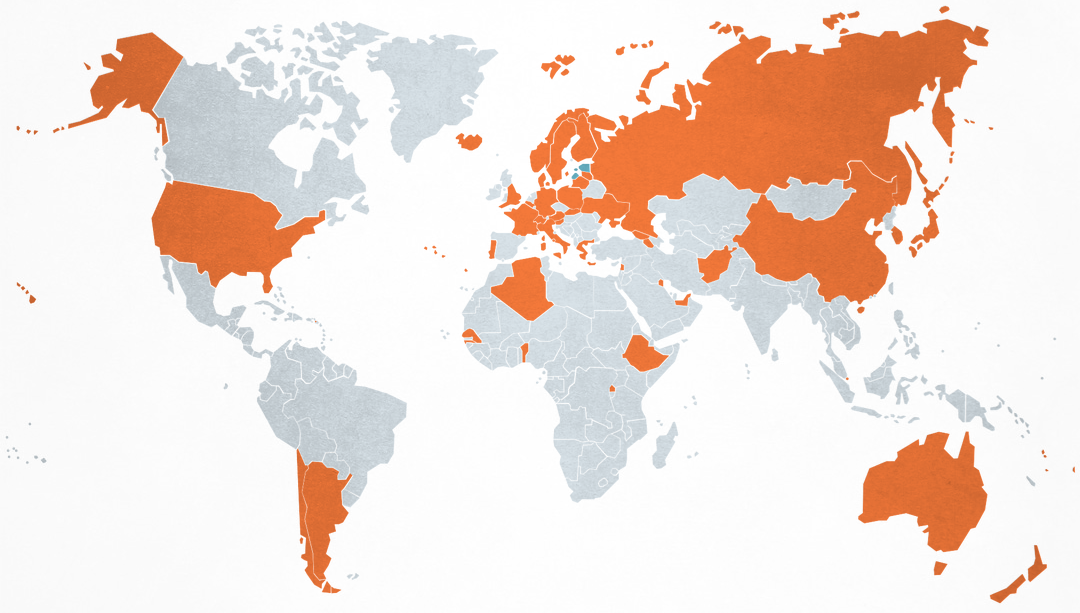
Map of countries visited by Kersti Kaljulaid from 2016 to 2021

== 2016 ==
Country	City	Date(s)	Type
Finland	Helsinki	20 October	State Visit
Latvia	Riga	20–21 October	State Visit
Lithuania	Vilnius	26 October	State Visit
Poland	Warsaw	2–3 November	State Visit
Germany	Berlin	10–11 November	State Visit
Finland	Helsinki	29–30 November	State Visit
France	Paris	7 December	State Visit

== 2017 ==
Country	City	Date(s)	Type
Belgium	Brussels	25–26 January	State Visit
Sweden	Stockholm	26 January	State Visit
Latvia	Riga	9 February	State Visit
Germany	Berlin	17–19 February	State Visit
Finland	Helsinki	7–8 March	State Visit
Lebanon	Beirut	9–12 March	State Visit
Belgium	Brussels	23–24 March	State Visit
Switzerland	Bern	3–4 May	State Visit
Italy	Rome	5–6 May	State Visit
Slovakia	Bratislava	26–27 May	State Visit
Italy	Rome	26–27 June	State Visit
Latvia	Riga	5 July	State Visit
Poland	Warsaw	6 July	State Visit
United States	New York City	20 September	Working Visit
Denmark	Copenhagen	26 September	State Visit
Italy	Rome	9 October	State Visit
Norway	Oslo	16 October	State Visit
Finland	Helsinki	19 October	State Visit
Georgia	Tbilisi	31 October–2 November	State Visit
Ethiopia	Addis Ababa	13–16 November	State Visit
Rwanda	Kigali	17–18 November	State Visit
Belgium	Brussels	21–23 November	State Visit
Finland	Helsinki	25 November	State Visit
Iceland	Reykjavík	28–30 November	State Visit
Germany	Berlin	3–5 December	State Visit

== 2018 ==
Country	City	Date(s)	Type
Austria	Vienna	1–2 January	State Visit
South Korea	Seoul	6–12 January	State Visit
Belgium	Brussels	18–19 January	Working Visit
Germany	Munich	15–18 February	Working Visit
Lithuania	Vilnius	16 February	Working Visit
United Kingdom	London	26–28 March	State Visit
United States	Washington, D.C.	2–5 April	Working Visit
France	Paris	8–10 April	Working Visit
United States	Washington, D.C.	19–23 April	Working Visit
Greece	Athens	16–18 May	Working Visit
Ukraine	Kyiv	22–23 May	State Visit
Poland	Warsaw	7–8 June	Working Visit
Finland	Helsinki	29–30 June	Working Visit
France	Paris	30 June–1 July	Working Visit
Germany	Berlin	13–14 July	State Visit
Georgia	Tbilisi	12 September	Working Visit
Latvia	Riga	13 September	Working Visit
Ukraine	Kyiv	14–15 September	Working Visit
China	Beijing	18–21 September	State Visit
United States	New York City/San Francisco	25 September–3 October	Working Visit
South Korea	Seoul	8–9 October	Working Visit
Armenia	Yerevan	11–12 October	Working Visit
Finland	Helsinki	16 October	State Visit
Australia	Canberra	20–21 October	Working Visit
Vanuatu	Port Vila	22 October	State Visit
Fiji	Suva	22–24 October	State Visit
New Zealand	Auckland	25 October–1 November	State Visit
United States	New York City	2–5 November	Working Visit
Finland	Helsinki	10–11 November	State Visit
Latvia	Riga	18 November	State Visit
Germany	Munich	2–4 December	Working Visit
Benin	Cotonou	5–6 December	State Visit
Senegal	Dakar	7–8 December	State Visit
Algeria	Algiers	9–10 December	State Visit

== 2019 ==
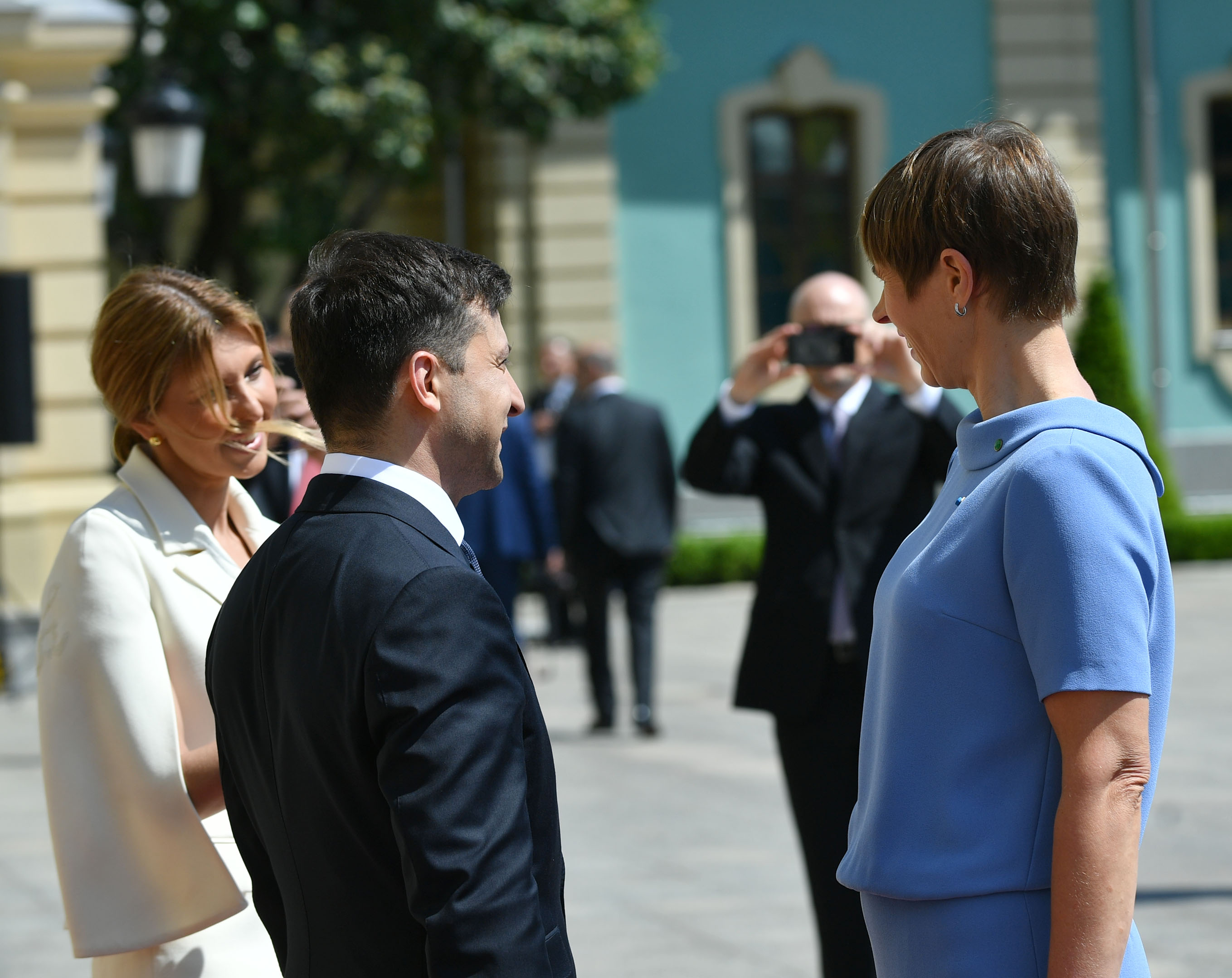
Kaljulaid with Ukrainian President Volodymyr Zelenskyy and Olena Zelenska during Zelenskyy's inauguration in Kyiv, May 2019.

Country	City	Date(s)	Type
Ethiopia	Addis Ababa	10–12 February	State Visit
Germany	Munich	15–17 February	Working Visit
Saint Kitts and Nevis	Basseterre	26–27 February	Working Visit
Slovakia	Bratislava	28 February–1 March	State Visit
United States	New York City/Washington, D.C.	11–15 March	Working Visit
Argentina	Buenos Aires	20–22 March	Working Visit
United States	New York City	7–9 April	Working Visit
Portugal	Lisbon	16–17 April	State Visit
Russia	Moscow	18 April	Working Visit
Ukraine	Kyiv	20 May	Inauguration of President Volodymyr Zelenskyy
Slovenia	Ljubljana/Brdo pri Kranju	5–6 June	Three Seas Initiative summit 2019
United States	New York City	6–9 June	Working Visit
France	Paris	14 July	Working Visit
France	Paris	21 July	Working Visit
Poland	Warsaw	1 September	80th anniversary of the September campaign
Slovenia	Ljubljana	2–3 September	State Visit
UAE	Abu Dhabi	9–11 September	Working Visit
Ukraine	Kyiv	12–13 September	Working Visit
United States	New York City	23–27 September	Working Visit
Germany	Berlin	8 October	Working Visit
Greece	Athens	11 October	Working Visit
Japan	Tokyo	21–25 October	2019 Japanese imperial transition
Kuwait	Kuwait City	4–6 November	State Visit
France	Paris	11–15 November	Working Visit
Belgium	Brussels	18 November	Working Visit
Vatican City	Holy See	28 November	Working Visit
Poland	Warsaw	12 December	Working Visit
Latvia	Riga	17 December	Working Visit

== 2020 ==
Country	City	Date(s)	Type
Germany	Munich	6–7 January	Working Visit
Chile	Santiago	16–17 January	Working Visit
Antarctica	Antarctica	21–28 January	Working Visit
Finland	Helsinki	6 February	Working Visit
Germany	Munich	15–16 February	Munich Security Conference
United States	New York City/Washington, D.C.	2–6 March	Working Visit
Germany	Berlin	28–30 June	State visit
Lithuania	Vilnius	14 August	Working Visit
Belgium	Brussels	7–8 October	Working Visit
France	Paris	9–10 October	Working Visit
France	Paris	21–23 October	Working Visit
Norway	Oslo	20 November	Working Visit
Italy	Rome	2–3 December	Working Visit

== 2021 ==
Country	City	Date(s)	Type
Lithuania	Vilnius	3 March	Working Visit
Spain	Madrid	8 March	Working Visit
Afghanistan	Kabul	21 April	Working Visit
Poland	Warsaw	3–5 May	Working Visit
Switzerland	Geneva	7–8 June	Working Visit
United States	Washington, D.C.	26 June–1 July	Working Visit
Singapore	Central Area	11–13 July	State visit
Japan	Tokyo	4–10 August	2020 Summer Olympics closing ceremony
Finland	Helsinki	12 August	Working Visit
Ukraine	Kyiv	22–24 August	Working Visit
Kenya	Nairobi	9–11 September	State Visit
Sweden	Stockholm	27 September	Working Visit

== Multilateral meetings ==
Group	Year					
Group	2016	2017	2018	2019	2020	2021
UNGA		20 September, (United States) New York City	25–26 September, (United States) New York City	23–27 September, (United States) New York City	25 September, (videoconference) (United States) New York City	27 September, (United States) New York City
Bucharest Nine	None	None	8 June, (Poland) Warsaw	25 February, (Slovakia) Košice	None	10 May, (Romania) Bucharest
Three Seas Initiative		6–7 July, (Poland) Warsaw	17–18 September, (Romania) Bucharest	5–6 June, (Slovenia) Ljubljana	19 October, (videoconference) (Estonia) Tallinn	8–9 July, (Bulgaria) Sofia
