= Vladimir Antonov (businessman) =

Russian fraudster

- Born: Vladimir Aleksandrovich Antonov; Владимир Александрович Антонов; 20 June 1975 (age 50); Uzbek SSR
- Education: Plekhanov Russian Academy of Economics (1998)

Vladimir Aleksandrovich Antonov (Russian: Владимир Александрович Антонов; born 1975) is a (formerly London-based) Russian convicted fraudster and criminal element, who operated under the guise of a banker, entrepreneur and investor. In 2007 Antonov's personal wealth was estimated at $300 million which ranked him as number 182 among Russian millionaires. In 2019 he was sentenced to a penal colony in relation to a conviction for fraud by a Russian court, and was further convicted for separate instances of fraud by a Latvian court in 2021.

== Education ==
In 1996, Antonov graduated from Plekhanov Russian Academy of Economics.

== Banking ==
Since 2004 Vladimir Antonov has been chairman of the Supervisory Board of the International Financial Group Convers Group. He is also chairman of the Supervisory Board of JSC Finasta Holding, a member of the Supervisory Board of JSC bank Finasta, the main shareholder and Chairman of the Lithuanian Bank Snoras Supervisory Board, a member of the Supervisory Board of the bank Latvijas Krājbanka.

=== Conversbank ===
Conversbank Financial Group operates as a financial and banking company in Europe and offers banking services for non-residents of the Russian Federation. The Group was founded in 1989 and is based in Moscow, the Russian Federation.

=== Bankas Snoras ===
Until November 2011, Vladimir Antonov was the main shareholder and chairman of leading Lithuanian bank, Bankas Snoras. The company was formerly known as Siauliai Regional Bank and changed its name to AB Bankas Snoras in 1993. AB Bankas Snoras was founded in 1992 and is based in Vilnius, Lithuania. In 2009 the bank applied to the British Financial Services Authority to operate in the UK. The FSA refused permission to conduct business in the UK because it repeatedly gave "misleading and incomplete" answers to the regulator. These include failing to mention that it had been refused permission to take retail deposits in Russia and had been fined by the Lithuanian banking regulator. The FSA also attacks the record of Bankas Snoras' largest shareholder and chairman of its supervisory board, Vladimir Antonov, whom it accuses of withholding information. “These failures are not an isolated instance but are examples of an ongoing pattern of behaviour by institutions controlled by Mr Antonov," the FSA said. The investigations by Lithuanian financial authorities and National Bank discovered that Snoras bank stated the possession of inexistent offshore assets. To prevent the bank from collapse and protect small shareholders and savings accounts holders, on 16 November 2011, 100% of shares of the bank Snoras were nationalised by the Lithuanian government. The bank and its operations is now under criminal investigation.

=== Investbank ===
Until March 2011, Vladimir Antonov was the First Deputy Chairman of Investbank. The bank was controlled by Vladimir Antonov following a merger with Grankombank, Voronezhprombank and Conversbank in April 2008. The company Investbank works closely with affiliated financial structures both inside Russia and abroad. Its service network covers Moscow, St. Petersburg, Kaliningrad, Sverdlovsk, Voronezh and Rostov regions.

=== Banco Transatlantico ===
Antonov owned a controlling stake in Banco Transatlantico (formerly Griffon Bank), headquartered in Dominica with a sister branch in Panama. He sold its 85.15% stake in the bank to minority shareholders in December 2011. The bank collapsed shortly after the Antonov's arrest.

== Spyker Cars ==
The Swedish National Debt Office (NDO) approved Vladimir Antonov as a shareholder of Dutch car maker Spyker. The debt office approved Vladimir Antonov's maximum investment of €30 million in Saab, owned by Spyker Cars in exchange for a stake of up to 29.9 percent of the company. The Swedish National Debt Office stated: "The National Debt Office has found no reason to deny the application from Saab and Spyker to make Vladimir Antonov an owner in Spyker."

Bo Lundgren, head of the Swedish National Debt Office said that part of the reason the Debt Office's review of Antonov took so long was the agency's need to examine rumours about his background, stating: "There have been a lot of rumours floating around which have led us to do this type of investigation. But we haven't found anything to indicate that he's inappropriate as an owner." In an article in the Financial Times in February 2011, Antonov said that newly acquired Spyker will build the company's new C8 sports car in Coventry and will also produce a sports-utility vehicle.

=== History ===
In 2007, Bankas Snoras acquired 29.9% of Dutch luxury automobile manufacturer, Spyker Cars, making Vladimir Antonov the single largest shareholder in the company.

In January 2010, it was reported that General Motors was preparing to sell Saab to Spyker for a nominal fee, and that the Swedish government had agreed to guarantee loans for the purchase from the European Investment Bank (EIB). If the takeover had been successful, the Saab brand and its operations would have been largely unaffected.

In January 2014, Antonov, 37, and his Lithuanian business partner Raimondas Baranauskas, 56, were alleged to have stripped nearly €500m million of assets and funds from Snoras Bank.

=== Allegations ===
Antonov's interests (29.9% of the shares) in Spyker Cars were said to have delayed the purchase of Saab Automobile in late 2009. An investigation by the Swedish monetary agency Riksgälden and the Swedish security police Säpo had allegedly found connections between the Antonov family and organised crime, as well as involvement in money laundering. Säpo reported their findings to the United States Federal Bureau of Investigation, and shortly afterwards GM stopped further talks about the deal until the Antonov family had sold their shares in Spyker Cars.

=== Exoneration ===
In January 2011, it was reported that GM was preparing to reverse its decision not to allow Antonov to hold a financial interest in Spyker and Saab and allow him to invest. Antonov said that he has no "connection to any criminal people" and that he had hired an investigative firm to produce evidence that he has no criminal background.

In December 2010, it was reported by Swedish financial newspaper, Dagens Industri, that two independent reports, one of which was commissioned by the Swedish government had shown that there was no evidence that Vladimir Antonov is guilty of any of the accusations made against him. Victor Muller, CEO of Spyker Cars, also stated that he believed Vladimir Antonov to be innocent of the accusations. Following this, Antonov was reported to be acquiring the sports-car division of Spyker Cars NV. However, the transaction was never completed.

== Arrest ==
On 23 November 2011, it was announced that a Europe-wide arrest warrant had been issued for Antonov. Lithuanian prosecutors want to question him as part of an investigation into alleged asset stripping at Snoras Bank. On 24 November, Antonov was arrested in London where he denied any wrongdoing. Two days later, on 25 November 2011, Antonov appeared in Westminster Magistrates' Court. As a result of being arrested, his properties have been seized. Antonov wrote on his Facebook Page, claiming he is a victim of politics Antonov's extradition to face Lithuanian prosecutors was delayed until January.

In July 2012, Antonov is expected to face full extradition hearing in January. In October 2012, Antonov extradition hearing is to go ahead next year despite difficulties with expert witnesses and the court hearing will be on 21 January 2013. However, on 21 January 2013, Antonov full extradition hearing was delayed until July. In September 2013, the hearing at Westminster Magistrates' Court was told by John Hardy QC, prosecuting, that Antonov, along with Raimondas Baranauskas, "submitted false documents to the Lithuanian central bank to conceal their activity across 33 transfers between 2008 and 2011". After a years of hearing, the court announced that Antonov will be extradited to Lithuania, on a condition that "they would receive a fair trial in Lithuania". In January 2014, Judge John Zani of London's Westminster Magistrates Court ruled in favour of extraditing Antonov and Baranauskas on the request of the Lithuanian Prosecutor General's Office. The two men filed an immediate appeal and in August 2014, it was reported that Antonov's appeal against deportation to Lithuania would be heard on 1 December 2014. In May 2015, Antonov lost his appeal for extradition. In July 2015, he was reported as having fled the UK. In September 2015, it was reported he was living in Moscow.

In March 2019 Vyborgsky District Court of Saint Petersburg sentenced Vladimir Antonov to 2,5 years of standard regime penal colony for fraud in the amount of 150 million roubles of bank Sovetsky and to a monetary fine. In August 2021, Vladimir Antonov, as ex-co-owner of Latvijas Krājbanka, was found guilty of grand embezzlement by Vidzeme Regional Court and was sentenced to six years in prison, to deprivation of property as well as to recovery of 27 million euros in profit of state of Latvia. This decision could be appealed in the Regional court of Riga.

== Motorsport ==
In April 2010, the Saabs United Historic Rally Team announced that Vladimir Antonov had accepted an invitation to drive their number two car for the 2010 Midnight Sun Rally in Sweden. In an interview with Swedish publication Jnytt, Antonov stated that his love for Saab started when he bought his first car, a Saab 9000, in 1994. Antonov participated in the race driving a 1978 replica of a specially built Saab 99.

== Football ==
In March 2011, it was announced that Convers Sports Initiatives (CSI) had acquired Executive Sport Ltd (ESL), the parent company of the popular 'Leaders in Football' conference.

In June 2011, Antonov's CSI purchased Football League Championship team Portsmouth after months of negotiations with the club. Antonov revealed he made a plan for a new stadium at Portsmouth in the near future, once the club needs improvement on football. He resigned as chairman on 29 November after the club's parent company Convers Sports Initiatives entered administration. Soon after he resigned for the club, leaving the club without an owner, the club would go to administration after being issued with a winding up petition by HMRC for over £1.6 million in unpaid taxes, which was heard on 20 February, resulting automatic 10-point deduction. During the same month as Portsmouth went to administration, The Football League spoke out about Antonov, accusing him of misleading the Football League authorities. In response, Antonov defended his time at Portsmouth, claiming the Lithuanian government were responsible for his trouble. At the end of the season, Portsmouth were relegated to League One (third tier) – the first time in 30 years that the club has played at that level.
