= State Labor Savings Banks System of the USSR =

Former Soviet bank

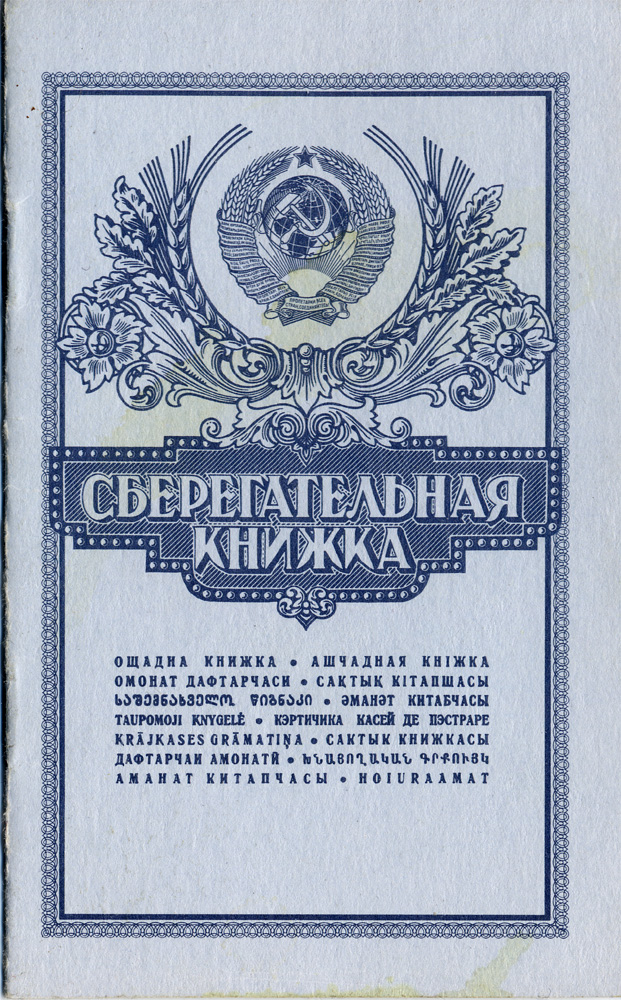
A soviet passbook with the words "savings booklet" in the USSR's 15 official languages

The system of State Labor Savings Banks of the USSR (Russian: Государственные трудовые сберегательные кассы СССР, shorthand Gostrudsberkassy) was the main retail bank of the Soviet Union, which in some respects perpetuated the prior operations of savings banks or Sberkassy in the Russian Empire. Unlike in other countries, the Soviet savings banks were not autonomous entities but were fully part of the state administration.

In 1987, the system was renamed the Savings Bank of the USSR (Russian: Сберегательный банк СССР), abbreviated as Sberbank. Following the dissolution of the Soviet Union, its operations were reorganized into new institutions in the post-Soviet states, such as Belarusbank in Belarus, Eesti Hoiupank in Estonia, Halyk Bank in Kazakhstan, Latvijas Krājbanka in Latvia, Lietuvõs Taũpomasis Bánkas in Lithuania, Banca de Economii in Moldova, Sberbank in Russia, and Oschadbank in Ukraine.

== Background ==
The history of savings banks in Russia goes back to Georg von Cancrin's financial reform of 1841, when a network of the first state-owned savings banks was created in the Russian Empire. By the end of the 19th century, the network reached almost four thousand outlets with over 2 million depositors.

From 1905, savings bank outlets became authorised to sell insurance. After 1910, savings banks started subsidising credit cooperation institutions and extending loans to small lenders. In 1915, savings bank outlets started accepting government securities for depositing. Like all other banks in the former empire, savings banks ceased to operate during the period of War Communism in the early 1920s.

== History ==
Finance commissariat order of 2 January 1923 announcing the decree of 26 December 1922 establishing state savings banks

On the territory of the Russian Soviet Republic, savings banks were established by the Resolution of the Council of People's Commissars of 26 December 1922. The first was opened in February 1923 in Petrograd, followed by five more later in the same month; by 1 October 1923, the number of savings banks had expanded to 7,362. On 27 November 1925, the State Labor Savings Banks System of the USSR was established by the Regulation on State Labor Savings Banks of the Union of Soviet Socialist Republics, adopted by the Resolution of the Central Executive Committee and the Council of People's Commissars of the Soviet Union.

The banks were established with the aim of providing the population with the opportunity to store and accumulate money with interest accrual. State labor savings banks were under the jurisdiction of the People's Commissariat of Finance. The names "savings bank" and "savings book" were assigned exclusively to state labor savings banks and the books issued by them. No other institution, state or private, could use these names. In order to attract depositors and increase the amount of deposits, so-called "savings fortnights" were held in 1926–1930. As a result of the all-Union savings fortnight held in September 1927, the number of depositors in savings banks increased by 500,000, and the amount of deposits by almost 30 million rubles.

The savings banks were also used to distribute state lottery tickets and for the placement of state bonds with the population. They introduced wider services such as money transfers, accepting various payments, e.g., for public utilities or fines, and depositing salaries.

Deposits, a withdrawal and balances recorded in a passbook, Babruysk District, Byelorussian SSR, 1937

A personal document for keeping track of person's savings is a kind of a passbook (Russian: сберкнижка, сберегательная книжка, "savings booklet", usually translated as savings book or savings-bank book). The track of deposits, withdrawals and accrued interest is written into the passbook by a sberkassa clerk. Since the system of consumer credit was virtually absent in the Soviet Union, in order to make a major purchase an ordinary Soviet citizen had to save for a long time.

Until 1963, savings banks were under the jurisdiction of the Ministry of Finance of the USSR. From January 1, 1963, the credit institution was transferred to the jurisdiction of the Gosbank. At that time, the system totalled 53.5 million individual accounts. Aside from prudential reserves, all the money placed in the accounts was loaned to the Soviet state. In the previous half-decade, this form of retail financing of the state had largely replaced the previous emphasis on public subscription of state bonds.

By the late 1980s, the Soviet savings bank system had almost 80 thousand branches. As part of Perestroika reforms, in 1987 the savings bank outlets are reorganised into the Savings Bank of the USSR. Within the Savings bank of the USSR, separate savings banks were created in the Soviet Republics. Following the dissolution of the USSR, the former republican savings banks became state savings banks of the newly independent post-Soviet states. The Russian successor entity initially branded itself "Sberbank of Russia" to avoid intellectual property disputes with its post-Soviet peers, but shortened it to "Sberbank" in late 2015 and "Sber" in 2020.

== See also ==
- Savings bank
- Banking in the Soviet Union
