= List of banks in Estonia =

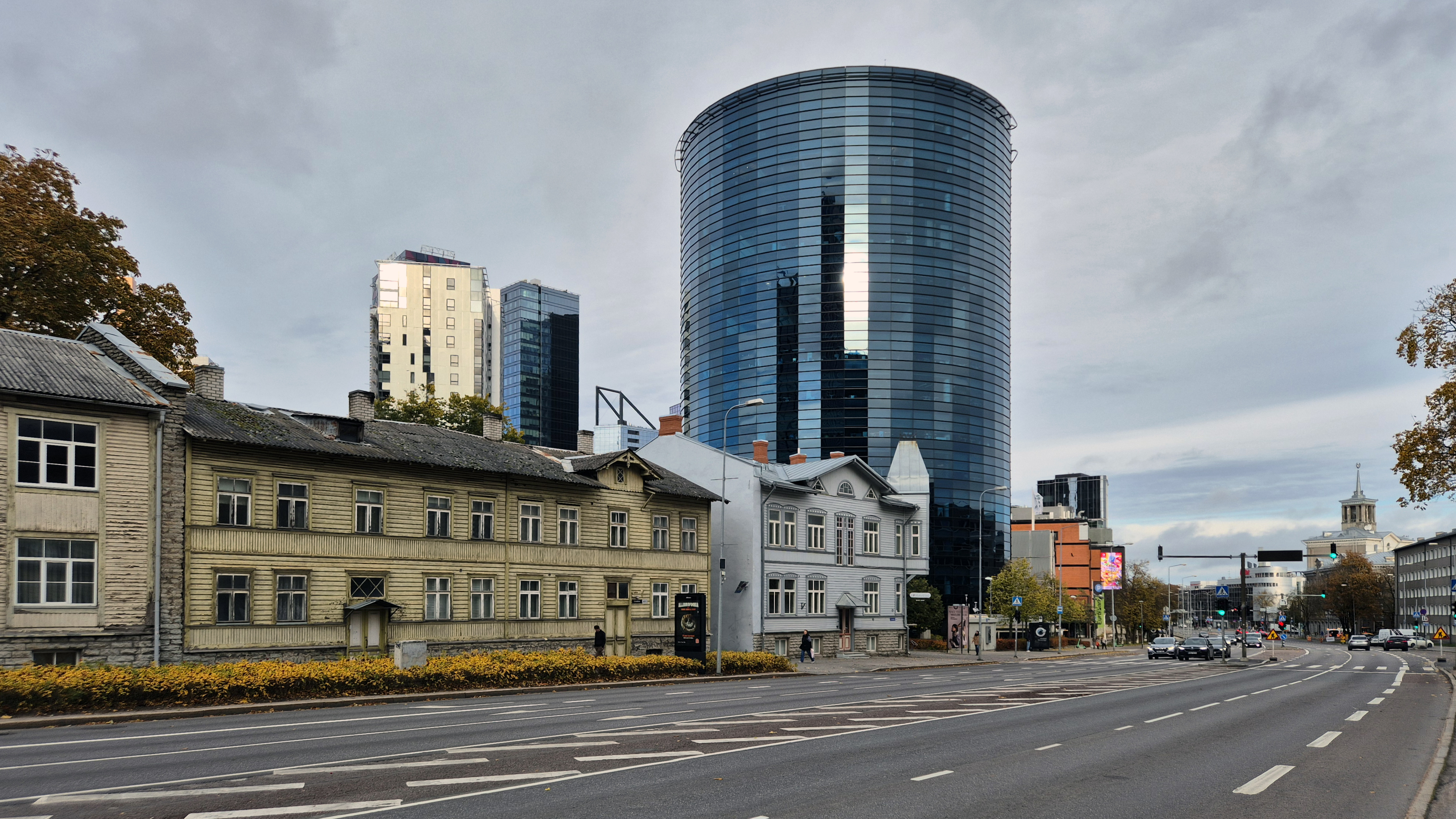
Luminor building in Tallinn

Swedbank building in Tallinn

SEB building in Tallinn

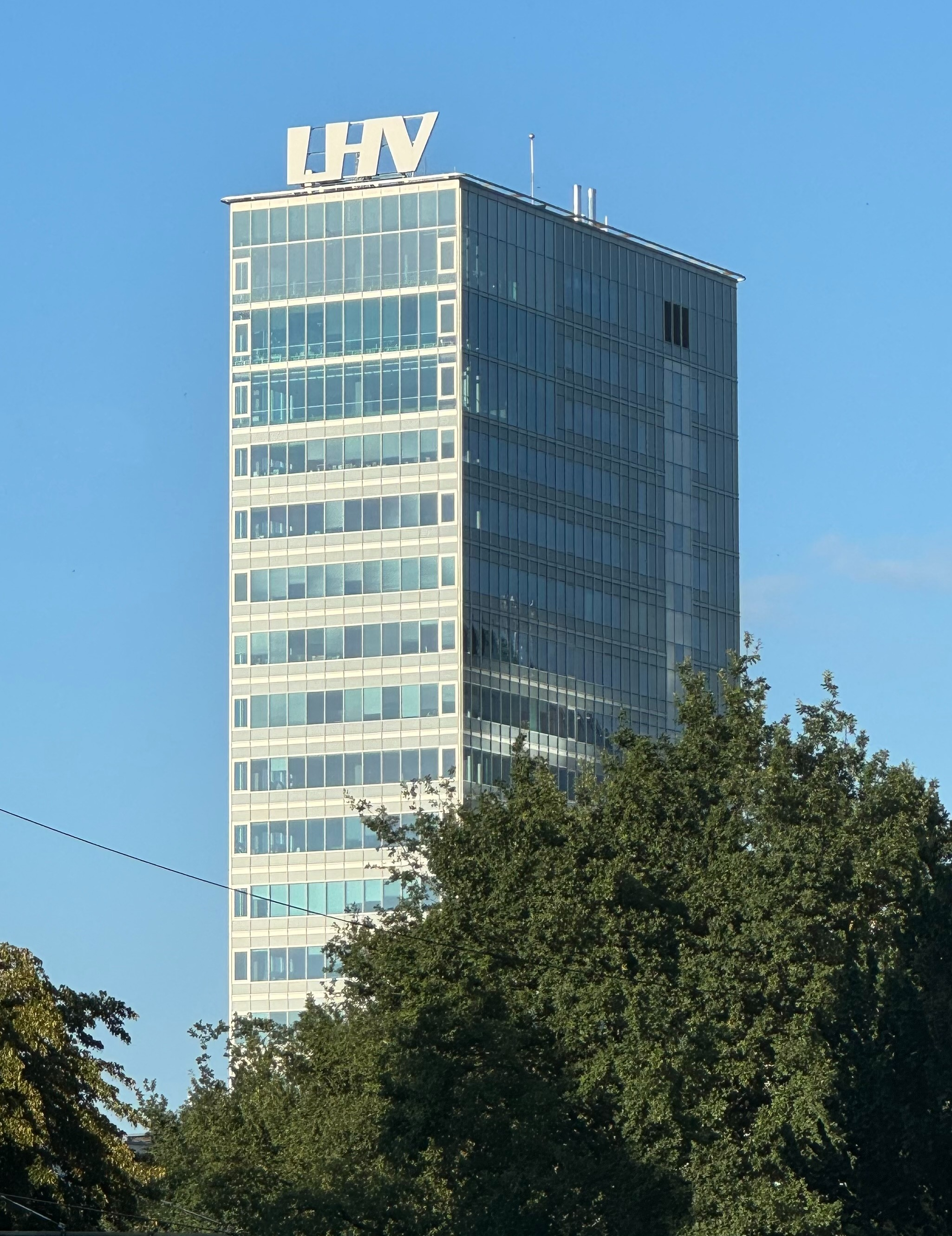
LHV building in Tallinn

The following list of banks in Estonia is to be understood within the framework of the European single market and European banking union, which means that Estonia's banking system is more open to cross-border banking operations than peers outside of the EU. The list leaves aside the country's National Central Bank within the Eurosystem, the Bank of Estonia.

== Policy framework ==
European banking supervision distinguishes between significant institutions (SIs) and less significant institutions (LSIs), with SI/LSI designations updated regularly by the European Central Bank (ECB). Significant institutions are directly supervised by the ECB using joint supervisory teams that involve the national competent authorities (NCAs) of individual participating countries. Less significant institutions are supervised by the relevant NCA on a day-to-day basis, under the supervisory oversight of the ECB. In Estonia's case, the NCA is the Estonian Financial Supervisory Authority.

== Significant institutions ==
As of 1 September 2025, the ECB had three Estonian banking groups in its list of significant institutions:

- LHV Pank
- Luminor Bank
- SEB Pank, a subsidiary of SEB Group

The Estonian affiliate of Swedbank is a direct subsidiary of Swedbank Baltics, the latter being an entity based in Riga and thus listed in the Latvian section of the ECB's list. A study published in 2024 found that it had a similar amount of assets in Estonia as Luminor (slightly above €15 billion each at end-2023), ahead of SEB (8.6 billion) and LHV (6.4 billion). No other SIs based in the euro area have subsidiaries in Estonia.

== Less significant institutions ==
As of 1 September 2025, the ECB's list of supervised institutions included six Estonian LSIs, three of which were designated by the ECB as "high-impact" on the basis of several criteria including size:

- Bigbank AS
- AS Inbank
- Coop Pank AS

The three other Estonian LSIs were:

- Koduliising OÜ, holding entity of Holm Bank
  - Holm Bank AS
- Estonian branch of TF Bank

As of October 2025, there were no branches of banks located outside the European Economic Area ("third-country branches" in EU parlance) in Estonia, based on data compiled by the European Banking Authority.

== Credit unions ==
Estonia is one of six euro-area countries with credit unions, together with Croatia, Ireland, Latvia, Lithuania, and the Netherlands. Estonian credit unions (Estonian: hoiu-laenuühistute) are small cooperative credit institutions outside the scope of the EU Capital Requirements Directives, and thus regulated and supervised under national law. At end-2023, there were 26 such Estonian credit unions with total assets of ca. €143 million (US$155 million).

== Foreign branches ==
Bank branches in Estonia include those of Citadele Banka, Nordea, OP Financial Group, and PayEx, the latter a Swedish firm that is part of the Swedbank Group.

As of October 2025, there were no branches of banks located outside the European Economic Area ("third-country branches") in Estonia, based on data compiled by the European Banking Authority.

== Defunct banks ==
A few former Estonian banks, defined as having been headquartered in the present-day territory of Estonia, are documented on Wikipedia. They are listed below in chronological order of establishment.

- Estonian Rural Credit Society (1802-1940)
- Livonian Rural Credit Society (1802-1920)
- Livonian Farmers' Rent Bank (1850-1911?)
- Bank of Tartu (1868-1940)
- Estonian Mortgage Bank (1884-1944)
- G. Scheel & Co (1884-1940)
- Tallinn Credit Bank (1906-1920)
- Bank of Pärnu (1907-1920)
- Kullamaa Cooperative Bank (1910-1944)
- North Estonian Cooperative Bank (1913-1940)
- Tallinn City Bank (1915-1940)
- Estonian Industrial and COmmercial Bank (1919-1928)
- Bank of Harju (1919-1925)
- Bank of Põhja (1919-1927)
- Estonian Loan Bank (1920-1940)
- Estonian People's Bank (1920-1940)
- Bank of Kauba (1920-1940)
- Tartu Jewish Cooperative Bank (1922-1941)
- Tartu Homeowners' Bank (1922-1940)
- Bank of Võru (1922-1940)
- Tallinn Homeowners' Bank (1924-1940)
- Farmers' Cooperative Bank (1925-1940)
- Estonian Land Bank (1926–1940)
- Pärnumaa Farmers' Cooperative Bank (1926-1940)
- National Mortgage Bank of Estonia (1927-1940)
- Nõmme Homeowners' Bank (1927-1940)
- Tartu City Bank (1927-1940)
- Farmers' Central Bank (1928-1940)
- Estonian Agricultural Bank (1929-1940)
- Estonian Republic Office of the Agricultural Bank of the USSR (1940-1941 & 1944-1959)
- Tartu Trade Bank (1988-1994)
- EVEA Pank (1989-1999)
- Second Estonian Land Bank (1990-1998)
- Estonian Commercial Bank of Industry and Construction (1990-1996)
- Baltic Cooperative Bank (1991-1993)
- Estonian Social Bank (1991-1995)
- ERA Pank (1991-1999)
- Otepää Cooperative Bank (1991-1993)
- Revalia Pank (1991-1994)
- TBB Pank (1991-2025)
- American Baltic Bank (1992-1996)
- Estonian Foreign Exchange Bank (1992-1997)
- Estonian Savings Banks (1992-1998)
- Estonian Investment Bank (1992-1998)
- Hansabank (1992-2008)
- Nowe Pank (1992-1995)
- Bank of Tallinn (1992-1998)
- North Estonian Bank (1993-1997)
- Raepank (1993-1995)
- INKO Balti Pank (1994-1997)
- Nordea Bank Estonia (1995-2017)
- Optiva Pank (1999-2000)
- Versobank AS (1999-2018)
- DNB Bank Estonia (2006-2017)

== See also ==
- List of banks in the euro area
- List of banks in Europe
