= Bigbank =

Company based in Estonia

Bigbank AS

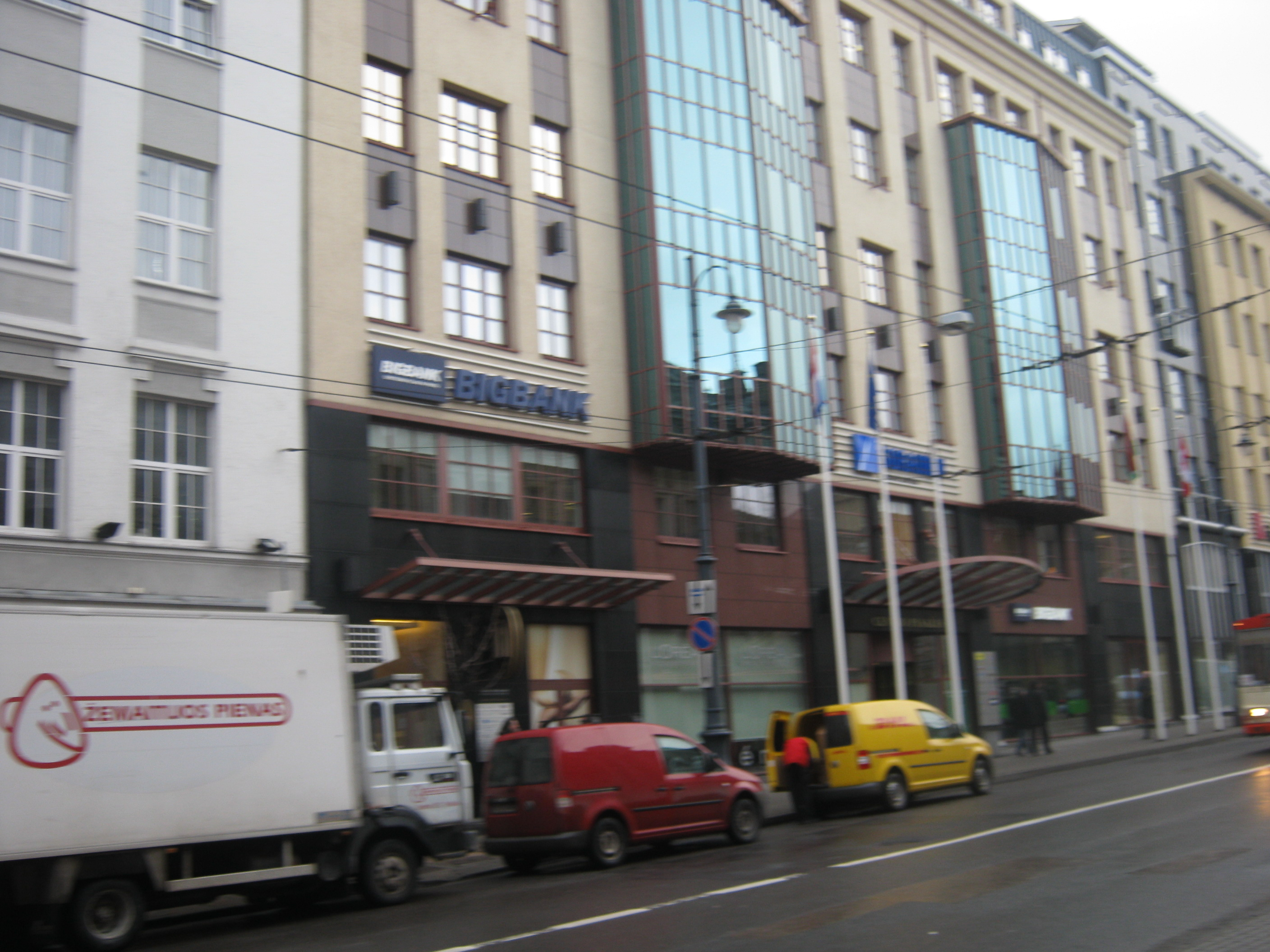
- Bigbank's office in Vilnius, Lithuania
- Type: Private company
- Industry: Financial services
- Founded: 1992; 34 years ago in Tartu, Estonia
- Headquarters: Tallinn, Estonia
- Area served: Northern Europe
- Products: Loans
- Number of employees: 385 (2020)
- Website: www.bigbank.eu

Bigbank AS is an Estonian bank headquartered in Tallinn, Estonia. The bank focuses on loans. The bank operates in the Baltic States, Bulgaria, Finland and Sweden and to some extent in Germany, Austria and Netherlands.

The bank was established in 1992, and as of 2020, had 385 employees.

Bigbank has been designated as a Significant Institution since the entry into force of European Banking Supervision in late 2014, and as a consequence is directly supervised by the European Central Bank.

== See also ==
- Bigbank Tartu (volleyball club)
- List of banks in the euro area
- List of banks in Estonia
