= Eesti Hoiupank =

Company based in Estonia

Hoiupank logo

Eesti Hoiupank (Estonian: Estonian Savings Bank) was an Estonian bank which operated from 1992 to 1998.

== Overview ==
Hoiupank was created during the dissolution of the Soviet Union from the Estonian operations of the Savings Bank of the USSR.

In September 1996, Hoiupank initiated a merger with the Estonian Commercial Bank of Industry and Construction (ETEK), the Estonian successor entity of the Soviet Promstroybank. It was subsequently the third-largest bank in the country.

Hoiupank merged into Hansapank (currently Swedbank's Estonian subsidiary) in 1998.

== See also ==
- Latvijas Krājbanka
- Lietuvõs Taũpomasis Bánkas
- List of banks in Estonia
