= TBB Pank =

Company based in Estonia

TBB pank (Estonian: TBB pank, legal name AS TBB pank) was an Estonian commercial bank which headquarters are located in Tallinn, Estonia. One office is located in Narva.

The bank was established in 1991.

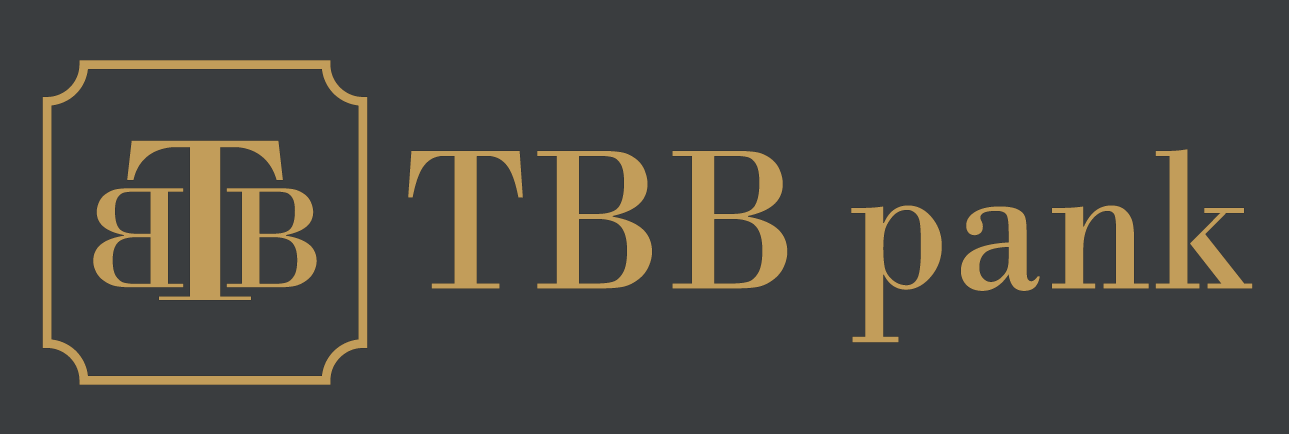
AS TBB pank logo

In 2018, the bank changes its name to TBB pank. Earlier, the name was Tallinna Äripank ('Tallinn Business Bank').

Since 2003, the bank is a full member of Mastercard International organization.

Since in July 2019, the bank is a direct member of STEP2 SEPA Credit Transfer (SCT) payment system at EBA CLEARING.

== See also ==
- List of banks in Estonia
