= ChromaWay =

Swedish blockchain technology company

ChromaWay AB
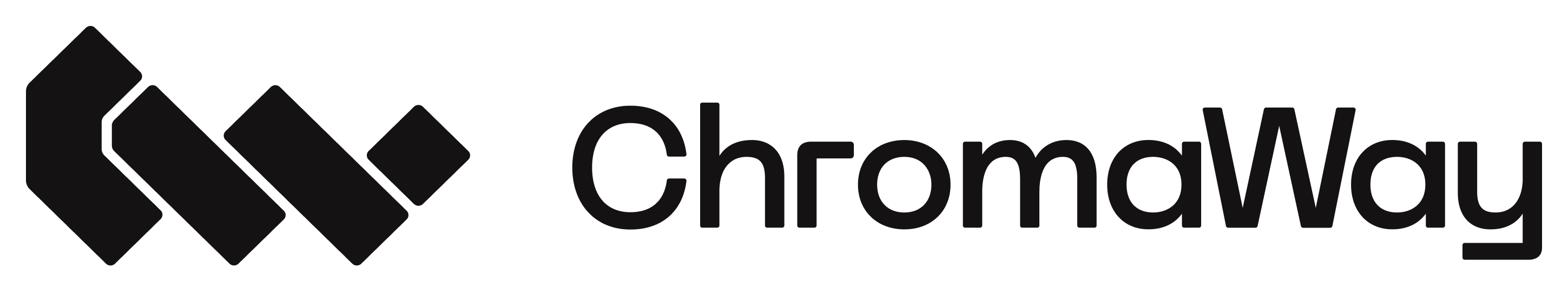
- Type: Private
- Industry: Blockchain, Cryptocurrency, Software Development
- Founded: 2014
- Founders: Henrik Hjelte, Alex Mizrahi, Or Perelman
- Headquarters: Stockholm, Sweden
- Products: Chromia
- Revenue: 354.7 million SEK (2023)
- Operating income: -89.2 million SEK (2023)
- Net income: 0 SEK (2023)
- Total assets: 791.4 million SEK (2023)
- Total equity: 493 million SEK (2023)
- Number of employees: 160 (2022)
- Website: chromaway.com

ChromaWay is a Swedish blockchain technology company founded in 2014, involved in decentralized applications, relational blockchain technology, web3, and smart contracts.

The company is known for developing the blockchain platform Chromia, as well as contributing to blockchain-based projects in land registry, gaming and fashion.

== History ==
ChromaWay traces its origins to the development of Colored Coins, an early protocol that enabled for users to issue their own tokens on the Bitcoin blockchain. ChromaWay's co-founder Alex Mizrahi was a lead developer of the Colored Coins project, which laid the foundation for blockchain-based asset tokenization.

Building on these concepts, ChromaWay was founded in 2014 by Henrik Hjelte, Alex Mizrahi, and Or Perelman with a focus on advancing blockchain technology beyond cryptocurrencies. One of its early initiatives was the development of a relational blockchain, designed to combine traditional database functionality with blockchain security and decentralization.

In 2014, ChromaWay collaborated with LHV Bank in Estonia to develop a blockchain-based system for issuance of a digital Euro, a so-called stablecoin, which they claimed to be one of the earliest practical implementations of blockchain in banking.

In the same year, the Estonian fintech platform Funderbeam worked with ChromaWay to enable blockchain-based trading of startup investments, which was reported to be one of the earliest implementations of a secondary market for private company shares on a blockchain.

In 2017, ChromaWay launched Postchain, which integrates blockchain features with traditional database management systems such as relational databases.

In 2017, the government of Andhra Pradesh, India collaborated with ChromaWay to explore blockchain-based land registry solutions with the stated aim of reducing fraud and improving efficiency.

In 2018, ChromaWay launched Chromapolis, a new type of blockchain platform designed to support scalable and user-friendly decentralized applications. The platform combined relational database technology with blockchain architecture, aiming to provide developers with tools to build complex applications with high performance and flexibility. The project was funded through a token sale, which was described by Dagens industri as one of the most significant of its kind in Sweden at the time. Chromapolis was later renamed Chromia, which is now ChromaWay's public blockchain network.

In 2018, ChromaWay collaborated with the Swedish land registry Lantmäteriet to implement a blockchain-based property transaction system. The project explored blockchain's potential to streamline real estate transactions and decrease fraud risks.

In 2018, ChromaWay's Postchain technology was adopted by Taiwanese startup SnowBridge for use in digital identity and data integrity applications.

In 2018, ChromaWay collaborated with Stockholm Green Digital Finance in a project described as seeking to utilize blockchain technology to enhance transparency and traceability in the green bond market.

In 2019, ChromaWay acquired Antler Interactive, a Swedish game studio, to integrate blockchain into gaming. This acquisition led to the development of the game My Neighbor Alice in which all game logic and digital assets are stored on the blockchain, and where users have control over the game's development.

In 2020, ChromaWay participated in blockchain-based land registry pilot projects implemented by the Inter-American Development Bank working with government agencies in Bolivia, Peru, and Paraguay.

In 2023, ChromaWay acquired the Swedish-American fashion brand BLK DNM, citing potential synergies between blockchain technology and digital fashion.

In 2024, ChromaWay joined the Amazon Web Services (AWS) Partner Network, allowing it to offer its blockchain technology through AWS Marketplace and integrated within AWS infrastructure.

In 2024, the sports club VfB Stuttgart offered blockchain-based collectibles using technology developed by ChromaWay.

== Technology ==
Postchain is ChromaWay's open-source database framework that integrates blockchain features while maintaining compatibility with existing relational database systems. It allows SQL developers to build blockchain applications without requiring specialized blockchain knowledge.

=== Chromia ===
Logotype of ChromaWay's blockchain platform Chromia

Chromia is ChromaWay's blockchain platform designed to support decentralized applications. Chromia utilizes a relational blockchain model, designed for application development, differing from traditional blockchains like Ethereum.

Postchain is the basis for Chromia.

Chromia uses the cryptocurrency CHR for transaction fees, staking, and governance within the platform.

== Financials ==
In 2018, ChromaWay secured US$15 million in funding through a private token sale to further develop its Chromia blockchain platform, then called Chromapolis, positioning it as a competitor to Ethereum. ChromaWay has also raised venture capital. In 2022, the company raised US$10 million from True Global Ventures and others to further develop Chromia and expand its operations.

As of 2023, the company reported annual revenues exceeding 664 million SEK, with a significant portion of its income derived from blockchain-based gaming.

== Notable projects ==
=== Land registries and real estate ===
As part of its global land registry initiatives, ChromaWay collaborated with Andhra Pradesh, marking one of the first government-backed experiments in blockchain land records. ChromaWay has collaborated with the Swedish Land Registry, the NSW Land Registry Services, the Inter-American Development Bank, and other governmental organizations to implement blockchain solutions for land registration, stating aims to enhance transparency and efficiency.

=== Blockchain gaming ===
ChromaWay's subsidiary, Antler Interactive, has developed blockchain-based games, including:

- My Neighbor Alice: A multiplayer online game where players can purchase virtual land and items as NFTs. The game's in-game currency, Alice, saw a significant price surge upon its launch on the Binance exchange.
- Mines of Dalarnia: A play-to-earn game where players mine resources and trade digital assets.

=== Fashion technology ===
Through its acquisition of BLK DNM founded by Johan Lindeberg, ChromaWay has stated plans to integrate blockchain technology into the fashion industry, including potential applications in digital identity for garments and tokenized ownership.

=== Sports fan engagement ===
ChromaWay founded Fanzeal to develop digital collectible platforms for sports clubs. One notable implementation is with VfB Stuttgart, where blockchain-based collectibles are provided to enhance fan engagement.

=== Sustainability ===
In 2024, ChromaWay received support from the European Blockchain Services Infrastructure (EBSI) for its blockchain-based sustainability and traceability efforts. The company participated in a European Union pre-commercial procurement initiative with its decentralized applications for Digital Product Passport and intellectual property rights. (Note: "Pre-commercial procurement" concerns the commissioning of research and development delivery in advance of production becoming commercially feasible.)

Additionally, ChromaWay was included in the European Blockchain Observatory and Forum’s research on blockchain applications in supply chain transparency and regulatory compliance.

=== Cap Table Management ===
ChromaWay has supported the development of Kvanta (formerly Capchap), a blockchain-based system designed to create a verified, real-time log of share ownership and related events in private companies for transparency and regulatory compliance. Kvanta was founded by ChromaWay and Legal Works Nordic, and received an initial investment of 15 million SEK with additional support from Vinnova.

Kvanta is also part of a reference group for the Swedish Companies Registration Office's "Proof of Business" project, contributing expertise on blockchain and distributed ledger technology.
