= Hansabank =

Company based in Estonia

Hansabank's logo

Hansa Group or Hansabank Group was a Baltic banking group operating in Estonia, Latvia, and Lithuania between 1992 and 2008. It started in Estonia and expanded to Latvia in 1995 then Lithuania in 1996. It was acquired by Stockholm-based FöreningsSparbanken, later Swedbank, in two stages in 1998 and 2005.

Following a decision taken by the Swedbank group on 15 September 2008, the name Hansapank/Hansabanka/Hansabankas or Hansabank internationally was discontinued end of 2008 with all operations rebranded under the Swedbank name as of 1 January 2009. The legal name of the bank changed in spring 2009.

== History ==
The history of the Hansabank Group dates back to 1 July 1991 when Hansapank started operating as a branch of Tartu Commercial Bank in Estonia. Officially Hansapank launched independent operations on 10 January 1992. Hansabank was founded in Estonia by Hannes Tamjärv, Jüri Mõis, Rain Lõhmus and Heldur Meerits.

The following year the bank set up its first subsidiary, AS Hansa Liising (Hansa Leasing), which focused on selling leasing products. In 1995 Hansabank also opened a branch in Riga, the capital of the neighbouring country Latvia and Hansa Liising's subsidiary, AS Hansa Leasing Latvia, was also launched. In 1996 Hansabank Group was formed and Hansabank's Latvian consumer banking was expanded through a merger with the German-Latvian Bank (Deutsche-Lettische Bank).

In 1996, Hansabank established its presence in the largest of the Baltic states, Lithuania. Differently from Estonia and Latvia, the first company set up there was Hansa Leasing Lithuania. In 1996 Hansabank Markets were created on the basis of bank's financial markets division; this unit dealt with financial markets of Baltic states. It was during this early period of rapid expansion that American investor and tycoon, Raymond Staples, became one of the first western investors to acquire a significant stake in the bank's now public shares. The year 1998 marks the period of mergers in the history of the bank. In April 1998, Hansabank merged with Eesti Hoiupank. In June 1998, the holding company of the Hansa Leasing Group, Hansa Capital, and Hoiupanga Liising (Hoiupank Leasing) signed a sales agreement. In September 1998, Hansabank Latvia and Hoiupank's Latvian subsidiary, Zemes Banka, signed a merger agreement.

The same year Swedish FöreningSparbanken (currently Swedbank) obtained over 50 per cent of Hansabank's shares through a share issue. In 2005 Swedbank made a buy-out offer to the minority shareholders and as of today Hansabank is a fully owned subsidiary of Swedbank Group.

In July 1999, Hansabank's Lithuanian subsidiary Hansabankas opened its doors to clients in Vilnius, adding commercial banking to the services provided by Hansabank Group in Lithuania.

In 2001, Hansabank acquired a 90.73 percent stake in the previously state-owned Lithuanian Savings Bank (Lithuanian: Lietuvõs Taũpomasis Bánkas, LTB) that had been formed in 1990 from the Lithuanian operations of the Savings Bank of the USSR and converted into a joint-stock company in 1992. At the time, LTB was Lithuania's largest banks by assets and in terms of branch network. LTB was rebranded Hansa-LTB in 2001, then Hansabank in 2003 and Swedbank in 2009.

On 10 March 2005 Hansabank successfully completed the acquisition of the Moscow-based OAO Kvest bank in Russia, which briefly operated under the Hansabank brand but has since been renamed Swedbank.

== National names and rebranding as Swedbank ==
Hansabank operated under the names: Hansapank (in Estonia), Hansabanka (in Latvia), Hansabankas (in Lithuania) and Hansabank internationally.

Business unit	Scope of activities
Hansapank, Estonia	Retail banking, Corporate banking, Asset management, Investment management, Leasing (hire-purchase)
Hansabanka, Latvia	Retail banking, Corporate banking, Asset management, Financial markets, Leasing (hire-purchase)
Hansabankas, Lithuania	Retail banking, Corporate banking, Asset management, Leasing (hire-purchase)

Source: Hansabanka Source: Hansabank Group

The Swedish banking group Swedbank obtained 50% of the group shares in 1998. It now owns 100% of Hansabank.

In the Baltic states, the main competitor of the Hansabank Group is the Swedish banking group SEB, which owns SEB Eesti Ühispank, SEB Unibanka and SEB Vilniaus bankas.

Following the decision to rebrand the bank under the Swedbank name, a number of branches were renamed as Swedbank in autumn 2008. The legal name of the bank changed in spring 2009.

== Controversy ==
In 1994, some of the funds for the illegal sale and illegal shipments of Russian weapons during the Iraq oil for food programme went through HansaBank to Estonia.

== See also ==
- Hanseatic League for historical basis of name
- Hanseatic Bank in Germany
- List of banks in Estonia
- List of banks in Latvia
- List of banks in Lithuania
