= 2 euro coin =

Highest-value euro coin

Two euro
- Eurozone (mainly) and other countries
- Value: 2 euro
- Mass: 8.5 g
- Diameter: 25.75 mm
- Thickness: 2.20 mm
- Edge: Edge lettering, fine milled. Exact design varies, see below.
- Composition: Outer segment: copper-nickel. Inner segment: three layers: nickel-brass, nickel, nickel-brass.
- Years of minting: 1999–present

Obverse
- Design: Numerous variations, see below.
- Designer: Various
- Design date: Various

Reverse
- Design: Map of Europe with the denomination shown in Latin characters
- Designer: Luc Luycx
- Design date: 2007
- Design: Map of the 15 EU countries of 1999 with the denomination shown in Latin characters
- Designer: Luc Luycx
- Design date: 1999
- Design discontinued: 2007 (still in circulation as of 2026)

The 2 euro coin (€2) is the highest-value euro coin and has been used since the introduction of the euro (in its cash form) in 2002. The coin is made of two alloys: the inner part of nickel brass, the outer part of copper-nickel. All coins have a common reverse side and country-specific national sides. The coin has been used since 2002, with the present common side design dating from 2007.

The €2 coin is the euro coin subject to legal-tender commemorative issues and hence there is a large number of national sides, including five issues of identical commemorative sides by all eurozone members.

== History ==
The coin dates from 2002, when euro coins and notes were introduced in the then 12-member eurozone and its related territories. Despite this, the coins of some countries were issued beginning in 1999. The common side was designed by Luc Luycx, a Belgian artist who won a Europe-wide competition to design the new coins. The designs of the one- and two-euro coins were intended to show the European Union (EU) as a whole with the then-15 countries more closely joined together than on the 10 to 50-cent coins (the 1-cent to 5-cent coins showed the EU as one, though intending to show its place in the world).

The national sides, then 15 (eurozone and Monaco, San Marino and the Vatican who could mint their own), were each designed according to national competitions, though to specifications which applied to all coins such as the requirement of including twelve stars (see euro coins for more). National designs were not allowed to change until the end of 2008, unless a monarch (whose portrait usually appears on the coins) died or abdicated. This happened in Monaco and the Vatican City resulting in three new designs in circulation (the Vatican had an interim sede vacante design until the new Pope was elected). However, starting in 2007, some national designs underwent minor changes due to regulations requiring national designs to meet a series of specifications.

In 2004, the very first €2 commemorative coin was issued by Greece to celebrate the Olympic Games in Athens in 2004. By 2007 nearly all states had issued a commemorative issue, and the first eurozone-wide commemorative was issued to celebrate the Treaty of Rome.

As the EU's membership has since expanded in 2004 and 2007, with further expansions envisaged, the common face of all euro coins from the value of 10 euro cent and above were redesigned in 2007 to show a new map. This map showed Europe, not just the EU, as one continuous landmass; however, Cyprus was moved west as the map cut off after the Bosphorus (which was seen as excluding Turkey for political reasons). The 2007 redesign coincided with the first enlargement of the eurozone in that year, with the entry of Slovenia. Hence, the Slovenian design was added to the designs in circulation.

Cyprus and Malta joined in 2008 and Slovakia in 2009, bringing three more designs. Also in 2009, the second eurozone-wide issue of a 2-euro commemorative coin was issued, celebrating ten years of the introduction of the euro. In 2011, Estonia joined the eurozone. In 2012, the third eurozone-wide issue of a 2-euro commemorative coin was issued, celebrating 10 years of euro coins and notes. In 2014, Latvia joined the eurozone. That same year, Andorra began minting its own designs after winning the right to do so. In 2015, Lithuania joined the eurozone. Also in 2015, the fourth eurozone-wide issue for this denomination was issued, commemorating the 30th anniversary of the flag of Europe. In 2022, the fifth eurozone-wide issue for this denomination was issued, commemorating the 35th anniversary of the Erasmus Programme. Finally, in 2023, Croatia joined the eurozone.

== Design ==
The coins are composed of two alloys. The inner circle is composed of three layers (nickel brass, nickel, nickel brass) and the outer ring of copper-nickel giving them a two colour (silver outer and gold inner) appearance. The diameter of the coins is 25.75 mm, the thickness is 2.20 mm and the mass is 8.5 grams. The coins' edges are finely milled with lettering, though the exact design of the edge can vary between states with some choosing to write the issuing state's name or denomination around the edge (see "edges" below). The coins have been used from 2002, though some are dated 1999 which is the year the euro was created as a currency, but not put into general circulation.

=== Reverse (common) side ===
The reverse was designed by Luc Luycx and displays a map of Europe, not including Iceland and cutting off, in a semicircle, at the Bosphorus, north through the middle of Ukraine, then Russia and through northern Scandinavia. Cyprus is located further west than it should be and Malta is shown disproportionately large so that it appears on the map. The map has numerous indentations giving an appearance of topography rather than a flat design. Six fine lines cut across the map except where there is landmass and have a star at each end — reflecting the twelve stars on the flag of Europe. Across the map is the word EURO, and a large number 2 appears to the left hand side of the coin. The designer's initials, LL, appear next to Cyprus.

In 2007, the map was updated to reflect the EU's enlargements in 2004 and 2007. Other than depicting the newly added countries, the new design was much the same. The map was less detailed and showed no national borders. The vertical lines running across the rightmost third of the coin are interrupted in the middle to make way for eastern Europe.

=== Obverse (national) sides ===
The obverse side of the coin depends on the issuing country. All have to include the name or an abbreviation of the issuing country. The national side of circulation coins shall bear a circle of 12 stars that shall fully surround the national design, including the year mark and the indication of the issuing Member State’s name. The side cannot repeat the denomination of the coin unless the issuing country uses an alphabet other than Latin. Currently, Greece, Cyprus and Bulgaria are the only such countries. Greece engraves "2 ΕΥΡΩ" (2 euro) on its coins and Bulgaria engraves "ЕВРО" (euro). Austria ignores this rule, engraving "2 EURO" on its coins, hence will have to change its design to comply this rule.

Belgium, Finland, France, the Netherlands and Spain minted coins dated 1999, 2000 and 2001 although these entered circulation in 2002. Monaco minted coins dated 2001 although these entered circulation in 2002 too.

State	Details	Years of minting (years shown)	Image
(Andorra) Andorran euro coins	Andorran coat of arms with the motto "virtus unita fortior" (virtue united is stronger). It features the word "Andorra" and the year of minting written vertically on the right-hand side.	2014 onwards	
(Austria) Austrian euro coins	Bertha von Suttner, a radical Austrian pacifist and Nobel Peace Prize winner, as a symbol of Austria's efforts to support peace. The Austrian flag is hatched below the denomination on the left hand side. The year appears on the right hand side.	2002 onwards	
(Belgium) Belgian euro coins	FIRST SERIES: An effigy of King Albert II. To the right hand side among the stars was the king's monogram, a letter "A", underneath a crown. The year is lower down, also among the stars.	1999–2007	
(Belgium) Belgian euro coins	SECOND SERIES: A redesign to include the letters BE (standing for Belgium) beneath the monogram, which was moved out of the stars into the centre circle but still to the right of the King's renewed portrait. The date was also moved out and placed beneath the effigy and included two symbols either side (left: signature mark of the master of the mint, right: mint mark). This portrait did not comply with previous decisions by the ECOFIN in 2005 and 2008. Therefore, an amendment was made in 2009, which reverted to the portrait of Albert II found in the first series. Mint marks, year and stars remained the same.	2008–2013	
(Belgium) Belgian euro coins	THIRD SERIES: In 2013, Albert II abdicated with Philippe of Belgium becoming King. He subsequently replaced Albert on Belgian euro coins.	2014 onwards	
(Bulgaria) Bulgarian euro coins	A portrait of Saint Paisius of Hilendar, a key figure of the Bulgarian national revival and author of Istoriya Slavyanobolgarskaya (Slavo-Bulgarian History). The design includes the year of issuance, the inscription “БЪЛГАРИЯ” (the country’s name in Bulgarian) and the word “ЕВРО” (“EURO”) in Cyrillic script.	2026 onwards	
(Croatia) Croatian euro coins	Silhouette map of Croatia with a checkerboard in the background, with the word "Hrvatska" ("Croatia") written along the edge.	2023 onwards	
(Cyprus) Cypriot euro coins	Idol of Pomos, a prehistoric sculpture dating from the 30th century BC, as an example of the island's historic civilisation and art. It includes the name of Cyprus in Greek and Turkish (ΚΥΠΡΟΣ and KIBRIS) on each side of the idol.	2008 onwards	
(Estonia) Estonian euro coins	A geographical image of Estonia and the word "Eesti" ("Estonia").	2011 onwards	
(Finland) Finnish euro coins	Fruit and leaves of the cloudberry, with the date visible at the bottom above the stars. It includes the initial "M" of the mint master of the Mint of Finland, Raimo Makkonen, to the bottom right. In 2007, the initial was replaced by the mint's mint mark and the letters FI (for Finland) were included on the right hand side of the horizon. Finland again amended the design of its coins in the 2008 issue, repositioning the mint mark and putting it on the inside of the coin.	1999 onwards	
(France) French euro coins	A stylised tree (which symbolises life, continuity and growth) upon a hexagon (l'hexagone is often used to refer to France due to its broadly hexagonal shape). The letters RF, standing for République française (French Republic), stand each side of the trunk of the tree. Around the edge, but inside the circle of stars, is the motto of France: “liberté, égalité, fraternité”. The stars themselves are stylised, linked together by a pattern of lines. The date is located towards the bottom between the stars and the mint marks are located at the top.	1999–2021	
(France) French euro coins	SECOND SERIES: The design features oak and olive branches that form the tree of life and symbolise strength, solidity and peace. The tree and the motto stand within a hexagon.	2022 onwards	
(Germany) German euro coins	The German coat of arms (the German eagle) which symbolises German sovereignty. The date appears at the base of the eagle and the silver behind the stars is etched to give visual effect.	2002 onwards	
(Greece) Greek euro coins	A depiction of the abduction of Europa by Zeus, in the form of a bull, shown in a 3rd-century Spartan mosaic. Europa was a Phoenician in Greek mythology, whose name, is the origin of the continent's name, "Europe". The value of the euro in the Greek alphabet, 2 ΕΥΡΩ, is shown below the motif. The mint's mark is to the top right, designer's initials to the left, the word "Europa" (ΕΥΡΩΠΗ) in Greek to the top left and the date on the bottom side among the stars.	2002 onwards	
(Republic of Ireland) Irish euro coins	The national emblem of Ireland, an Irish harp (the Cláirseach, see Clàrsach). Vertically on the left hand side is the word "Éire" (Ireland in the Irish language) and on the right hand side is the date. The harp motif was designed by Jarlath Hayes.	2002 onwards	
(Italy) Italian euro coins	A portrait of Dante Alighieri by Raphael. Dante was a poet in the Middle Ages and is considered the father of the Italian language while Raphael was a master artist and architect of the High Renaissance. The original portrait, part of the Disputation of the Holy Sacrament, is in the Apostolic Palace of Vatican City. It includes the interconnected letters IR (for Repubblica Italiana – Italian Republic), the year and the mint mark are shown to the left of Dante's face.	2002 onwards	
(Latvia) Latvian euro coins	The Latvian maiden, which symbolises the freedom of the Republic of Latvia, with "Latvijas Republika" written on either side.	2014 onwards	
(Lithuania) Lithuanian euro coins	The Vytis (symbol of the coat-of-arms) and the word "Lietuva", which means "Lithuania". The twelve stars, symbols of the EU, surrounds the Vytis.	2015 onwards	
(Luxembourg) Luxembourgish euro coins	FIRST SERIES: A stylised effigy of Grand Duke Henri of Luxembourg. The left 40% of the coin has the effigy cut off and the style of the stars inverted. The year, followed by "LËTZEBUERG" (Luxembourg in Luxembourgish) written vertically.	2002–2025	
(Luxembourg) Luxembourgish euro coins	SECOND SERIES: On the right, the effigy of Grand Duke Guillaume looking towards the left. Facing the effigy is the inscription of the issuing country "LËTZEBUERG" in a vertical reading. A stylised partial representation of the Luxembourg Lion is depicted at the left of the inner part of the coin.	2026 onwards	
(Malta) Maltese euro coins	The Maltese Cross (the emblem of the Sovereign Military Order of Malta: 1520–1798, now a national symbol), with the background of a darker hatched texture. The word MALTA is shown with each letter appearing in a segment across the top half of the coin to the edge of the inner circle. The date is shown at the base of the inner circle.	2008 onwards	
(Monaco) Monégasque euro coins	FIRST SERIES: An effigy of Prince Rainier III with the name MONACO was written across the top of the coin's outer circle and the year across the bottom of the outer circle with the mint marks.	2001–2005	
(Monaco) Monégasque euro coins	SECOND SERIES: Upon the death of Prince Rainier III in 2005, and the accession of Prince Albert II Prince Rainier's effigy was replaced with that of Prince Albert's and the name Monaco and the year were brought within the inner circle.	2006–2024	
(Monaco) Monégasque euro coins	THIRD SERIES: The coin shows a more contemporary representation, along with symbolic elements to represent the Grimaldi family.	2025 onwards	
(Netherlands) Dutch euro coins	FIRST SERIES: A stylised profile of Queen Beatrix of the Netherlands over the left half of the coin, with the right hand side containing the words "Beatrix Koningin der Nederlanden" ("Beatrix Queen of The Netherlands" in Dutch) written vertically on three lines and the year written horizontally to the lower right. This design was taken from the former Dutch guilder. The mint marks are located on the bottom of the outer ring and the twelve stars are compressed onto the left side of the coin only, rather than forming a full circle.	1999–2013	
(Netherlands) Dutch euro coins	SECOND SERIES: Following the change of head of state, a new Dutch series was introduced from 2014. It shows the effigy of King Willem-Alexander facing right and bears the inscription "Willem-Alexander Koning der Nederlanden" (William-Alexander King of the Netherlands) with the year of issuance.	2014 onwards	
(Portugal) Portuguese euro coins	The royal seal of 1144 surrounded by the country's castles and five escutcheona with silver bezants set in relation to the surrounding European stars which is supposed to symbolise dialogue, exchange of values and dynamics in the building of Europe. Between the castles is the numbers of the year towards the bottom and the letters of the name Portugal between the upper icons. The stars are inset on a ridge.	2002 onwards	
(San Marino) Sammarinese euro coins	FIRST SERIES: The Palazzo Pubblico, the town hall and main government building of the city state. The date and mint mark is shown on the left, and the name San Marino on the right.	2002–2016	
(San Marino) Sammarinese euro coins	SECOND SERIES: A portrait of Saint Marino, detail of a painting by Giovanni Battista Urbinelli.	2017 onwards	
(Slovakia) Slovak euro coins	The Coat of arms of Slovakia, a double cross on three hills extending across the lower three stars. The background is a relief of rocks, representing the stability and strength of Slovakia. "SLOVENSKO" (Slovakia) is written to the right of the emblem and the date to the lower left.	2009 onwards	
(Slovenia) Slovenian euro coins	A silhouette of France Prešeren, a Slovene romantic poet from the 19th century who inspired much of Slovene literature that followed him. Below his silhouette are the words, in stylised writing, "Shivé naj vsi naródi" meaning "God’s blessing on all nations". This is from the first line of the Slovenian national anthem, which is the 7th stanza of Zdravljica, a poem by France Prešeren. To the bottom left, tracing the curve of the outer circle is Prešeren's name and similarly on the right hand side, divided by a star per letter, is the name SLOVENIJA (Slovenia). The year and mint marks are also placed within the stars.	2007 onwards	
(Spain) Spanish euro coins	FIRST SERIES: An effigy of King Juan Carlos I designed by Luis José Díaz. To his left on a curved raised area is the name "España" (Spain) and four stars on the right hand size are on a raise area in the same manner. The mint mark is located beneath España and the date on the lower portion between the stars.	1999–2009	
(Spain) Spanish euro coins	SECOND SERIES: The second design removed the curved raised area for the country's name and the stars, and moved the date from the outer ring of the coin.	2010–2014	
(Spain) Spanish euro coins	THIRD SERIES: In 2014, Juan Carlos I of Spain abdicated in favour of his son. In June 2014 the enthronement took place and 8 months later (February 2015) the new design was released.	2015 onwards	
(Vatican City) Vatican euro coins	FIRST SERIES: An effigy of Pope John Paul II. The name CITTA DEL VATICANO (Vatican City), followed by the year and mint mark, was written in a break between the stars below.	2002–2005	
(Vatican City) Vatican euro coins	SECOND SERIES: Following the death of John Paul II in 2005, a new coin was issued during the Sede vacante until a new Pope was chosen. This contained the insignia of the Apostolic Chamber and the coat of arms of the Cardinal Chamberlain.	2005	
(Vatican City) Vatican euro coins	THIRD SERIES: When Pope Benedict XVI was elected, his effigy appeared on the coins, with the name of the city now broken to his top right with the year and mint mark in the middle to his right.	2006–2013	
(Vatican City) Vatican euro coins	FOURTH SERIES: In 2014 the coins were updated with the election of Pope Francis. CITTA DEL VATICANO is written around the top, broken by Pope Francis' head, with the date below the O in Vaticano.	2014–2016	
(Vatican City) Vatican euro coins	FIFTH SERIES: After the announcement that Pope Francis would no longer appear on any coins issued by the Vatican, new 1 and 2 euro coins were issued to depict the papal coat of arms of Francis.	2017–2025	
(Vatican City) Vatican euro coins	SIXTH SERIES: Effigy of Pope Leo XIV with elements of his coat of arms (lily, burning heart pierced by an arrow above a book).	2026 onwards	

==== Edges ====
The edges of the 2 euro coin vary according to the issuing state;

Standard €2 edge inscriptions by country
Country	Edge inscription	Description
Andorra, Belgium, France, Ireland, Luxembourg, Monaco, Spain		The sequence "2 ★ ★" repeated six times alternately upright and inverted.
Austria		The sequence "2 EURO ★★★" repeated four times alternately upright and inverted.
Bulgaria		The inscription “• БОЖЕ ПАЗИ БЪЛГАРИЯ” (“BOZHE PAZI BŬLGARIA”: “GOD PROTECT BULGARIA” in Bulgarian) is written twice, both normally and in reverse.
Croatia		"O LIJEPA O DRAGA O SLATKA SLOBODO" ("Oh beautiful, oh dear, oh sweet freedom" in Croatian, from Dubravka).
Cyprus		The sequence "2 ΕΥΡΩ 2 EURO" repeated twice (2 EURO in Greek and Turkish).
Estonia		"EESTI ○" (ESTONIA in Estonian) upright and inverted.
Finland		"SUOMI FINLAND" (FINLAND in both Finnish and Swedish, the two official languages in Finland), followed by three lion's heads.
Germany		"EINIGKEIT UND RECHT UND FREIHEIT" (UNITY AND JUSTICE AND FREEDOM in German), Germany's national motto and the beginning of Germany's national anthem, followed by the Federal Eagle.
Greece		"ΕΛΛΗΝΙΚΗ ΔΗΜΟΚΡΑΤΙΑ ★" ("ELLINIKI DHIMOKRATIA": "HELLENIC REPUBLIC" in Greek).
Italy, San Marino, Vatican		The sequence "2 ★" repeated six times alternately upright and inverted.
Latvia		"DIEVS ★ SVĒTĪ ★ LATVIJU ★" (GOD BLESS LATVIA)
Lithuania		"LAISVĖ ★ VIENYBĖ ★ GEROVĖ ★" ("Freedom, Unity, Prosperity" in Lithuanian)
Malta		The sequence "2✠✠" (with Maltese crosses) repeated six times alternately upright and inverted
Netherlands		"GOD ★ ZIJ ★ MET ★ ONS ★" (GOD BE WITH US in Dutch). The same lettering had been applied to the larger denomination guilder coins.
Portugal		The edge design features the seven castles and five coats of arms also found on the national side, all equally spaced.
Slovakia		"SLOVENSKÁ REPUBLIKA" (SLOVAK REPUBLIC in Slovak) with two stars and linden leaf between.
Slovenia		"SLOVENIJA •" (SLOVENIA in Slovene)

==== Potential designs ====
Austria, Germany and Greece will also at some point need to update their designs to comply with guidelines stating they must include the issuing state's name or initial, and not repeat the denomination of the coin (Austria only). On the other hand, Slovenia and Greece have to comply with the star rule.

In addition, there are several EU states that have not yet adopted the euro, some of them have already agreed upon their coin designs however it is not known exactly when they will adopt the currency, and therefore these are not yet minted. See enlargement of the Eurozone for expected entry dates of these countries.

== Commemorative issues ==
Each state, allowed to issue coins, may also mint two commemorative coins each year (until 2012, it was one a year). Only €2 coins may be used in this way (for them to be legal tender) and there is a limit on the number that can be issued. The coin must show the normal design criteria, such as the twelve stars, the year and the issuing country. In 2007, 2009, 2012, 2015 and 2022 every then-eurozone state issued a common coin (with only different languages and country names used) to commemorate events of Europe-wide importance. Eurozone-wide issues do not count as a state's two-a-year issue.

=== Types of Commemorative €2 coins ===
There are several types of Commemorative €2 Coins:

1. Commemorative coins issued by a single country
2. Commemorative coins issued by a number of countries
3. Commemorative coins that are issued jointly by all eurozone countries

==== Commemorative coins issued by a single country ====
As a rule, euro countries may each issue only two €2 commemorative coins per year. Exceptionally, they are allowed to issue another, provided that it is a joint issuance and commemorates events of European-wide importance.

==== Commemorative coins issued by a number of countries ====
There are €2 commemorative coins that have been issued on the same topic by different member states, two (by Belgium and Italy) to celebrate Louis Braille's 200th birthday, four (by Italy, Belgium, Portugal and Finland) to celebrate 60th anniversary of the Universal Declaration of Human Rights, two (by Germany and France) to commemorate 50 years of the Elysee Treaty (1963–2013) and three (by Lithuania, Latvia and Estonia) to commemorate the 100th anniversary of the foundation of the independent Baltic states.

==== Commemorative coins that are issued jointly by all eurozone countries ====
So far, there have been five commemorative coins that the eurozone countries have issued jointly: the first one, in 2007, to commemorate the "50th anniversary of the Treaty of Rome"; the second one, in 2009, to commemorate the tenth anniversary of the euro is celebrated with a coin called the "10th anniversary of Economic and Monetary Union of the European Union"; the third one, in 2012, to commemorate 10 years of the euro coins and notes; the fourth one, in 2015, to commemorate 30 years of the Flag of Europe; and the fifth one, in 2022, to commemorate 35 years of the Erasmus Programme.

=== Proposing a topic for a €2 Commemorative Coin ===
==== Role of the European Central Bank ====
Designing and issuing the coins is the competence of the individual euro countries. The ECB's role regarding the commemorative but also all other coins is to approve the maximum volumes of coins that the individual countries may issue.

"Unlike banknotes, euro coins are still a national competence and not the ECB's. If a euro area country intends to issue a €2 commemorative coin it has to inform the European Commission. There is no reporting by euro area countries to the ECB. The Commission publishes the information in the multilingual Official Journal of the EU (C series).

The Official Journal is the authoritative source upon which the ECB bases its website updates on euro coins. The reporting process, the translation into 22 languages and publishing lead to unavoidable delays. The coin pages on the ECB’s website cannot therefore always be updated as timely as users might wish.

If the ECB learns of a euro coin that has not yet featured in the Official Journal, only its image will be posted on the ECB’s website, with a brief statement that confirmation by the European Commission is pending."

==== Role of the Directorate-General for Economic and Financial Affairs ====
The website of the EU – DG for Economic and Financial Affairs is not specific on the topic of proposing themes for €2 commemorative coins.

The website of the European Central Bank where the Euro coins are mentioned, is not specific on the topic of proposing themes for €2 commemorative coins. It is not mentioned how the €2 commemorative coins that are in circulation today came about.

== Similar coins ==
The coins were minted in several of the participating countries, many using blanks produced at the Birmingham Mint in Birmingham, England. A problem has arisen in differentiation of coins made using similar blanks and minting techniques.

- The Turkish 1 New Lira coin (which was in circulation from 2005 until 2008) closely resembled the €2 coin in both weight and size, and both coins seem to be recognized and accepted by coin-operated machines as being a €2 coin; however, 2 euro are worth roughly 20 times than 1 Turkish lira. There are now some vending machines which have been upgraded to reject the 1 lira coin.
- The 10 Thai baht coin, first minted in 1988, which is of similar shape and size to a €2 coin but worth around one-eighth of the value has recently been appearing in the coin boxes of vending machines throughout Europe and being given back as change in some smaller establishments.
- The new 50 gapik coin of the Azerbaijani manat also looks like a €2 coin. The new coin set of the country contains other coins similar to some euro coins.
- The Philippine ₱10 coin of the BSP series is also similar to the 2 Euro coin making it easy to pass for a Euro in some establishments in the Eurozone.
- The Egyptian pound coin is also similar to the 2 Euro coin making it easy to pass for a Euro in some establishments in the Eurozone. It's worth around 12–13 Euro Cents (1/16 of a 2 Euro coin). It is slightly thicker, with a marginally smaller diameter. In everyday exchanges the similarity is effectively misleading. Its use has been attested in Amsterdam.
- The Mexican $5 coin is also similar to the 2 Euro coin. It is worth around 28 Euro Cents (1/7 of the 2 Euro coin).
- The Canadian $2 coin or 'toonie', first minted in 1996, also bears a small similarity to the €2 coin. The toonie however is 2mm larger in diameter, 0.40mm less thick, 1.5g lighter, and features a larger outer ring. It is worth around 1.40 EUR.
- The Polish 5 złotych coin, currently worth about 1.16 EUR.
- The Indonesian Rp1000 coin, minted between 1993 and 2000, weighs 0.1g more, has a diameter 0.25mm larger and is 0.20mm thinner. The coin is worth approximately €0.06 (1/30th of a €2 coin).
- The South African R5 is also similar in appearance and size, and is worth around €0.40.
- The Italian 500 lire minted from 1982 to 2001 has a diameter 0.05 larger. The coin was worth approximately €0.25.
