= Adoption of the euro in Latvia =

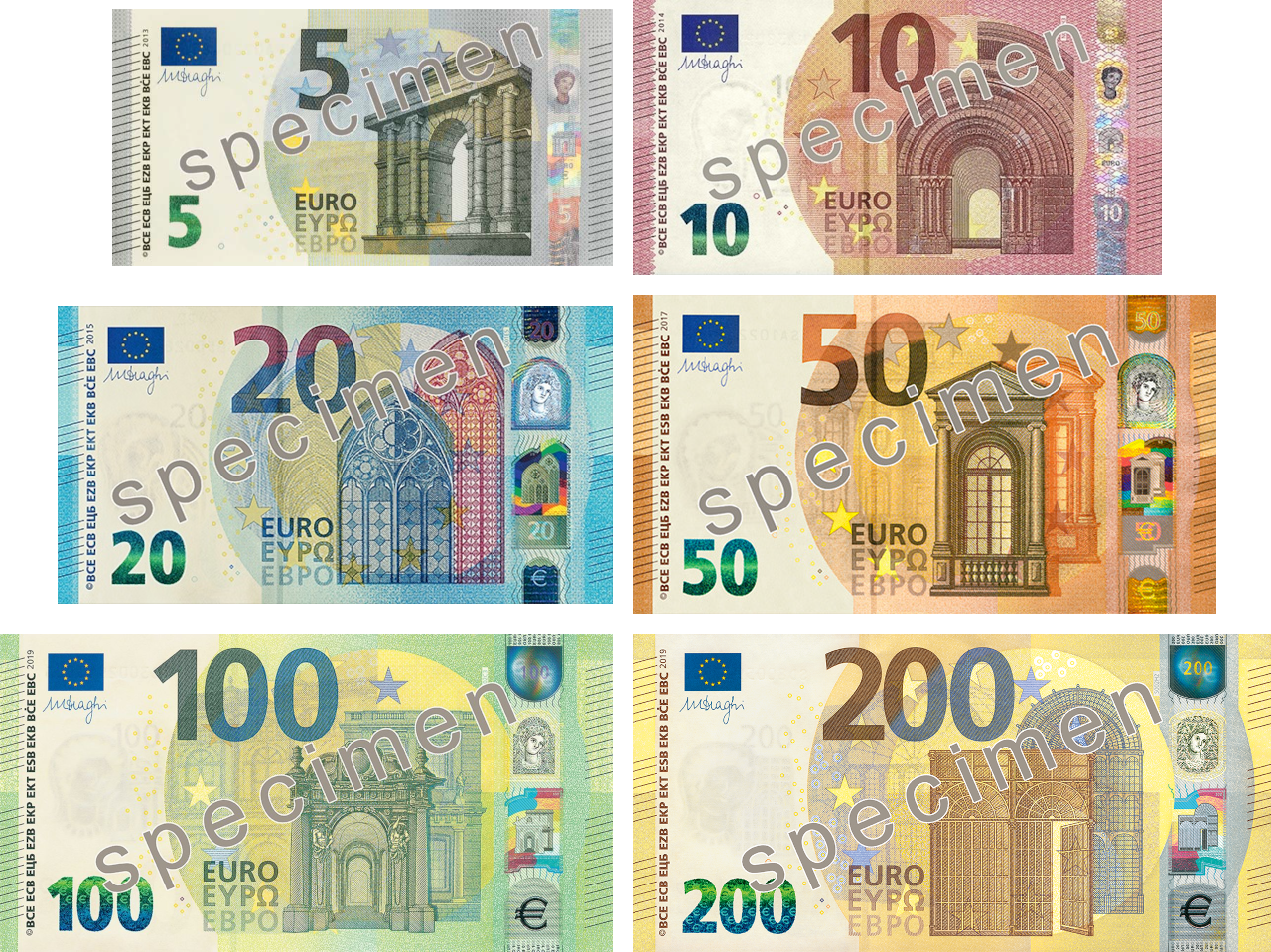
- Euro banknotes - all denominations
- Date: 1 January 2014 (introduction) – 14 January 2014 (complete transition).
- Location: Latvia
- Type: Economic transition
- Theme: Adoption of the euro as the national currency
- Participants: Government of Latvia, European Union
- Outcome: Replacement of the Latvian lats with the euro

Eurozone participation European Union member states (special territories not shown) 21 in the eurozone 1 in ERM II, with an opt-out (Denmark) 5 not in ERM II, but committed to join the eurozone after meeting the convergence criteria (Czech Republic, Hungary, Poland, Romania, and Sweden) Non–EU member states 4 using the euro with a monetary agreement (Andorra, Monaco, San Marino, and Vatican City) 2 using the euro unilaterally (Kosovo and Montenegro)

Latvia replaced its previous currency, the lats, with the euro on 1 January 2014, after a European Union (EU) assessment in June 2013 asserted that the country had met all convergence criteria necessary for euro adoption. The adoption process began 1 May 2004, when Latvia joined the European Union, entering the EU's Economic and Monetary Union. At the start of 2005, the lats was pegged to the euro at Ls 0.702804 = €1, and Latvia joined the European Exchange Rate Mechanism (ERM ll), four months later on 2 May 2005.

== History ==
Latvia's Treaty of Accession to the European Union (EU) obliged it to eventually adopt the euro. Latvia had originally planned to adopt the euro on 1 January 2008, but for various reasons this was subsequently delayed several times. After being elected in 2011, Latvian President Andris Bērziņš announced the official goal was for Latvia to join the eurozone in 2014, saying "personally I'm very optimistic we'll join the euro on 1 January 2014. It's our goal and we are working hard to implement this process." In September 2012, Latvian Prime Minister Valdis Dombrovskis reiterated that "Latvia is on track for 2014 and permission to join would be sought in 2013."

== Convergence ==
Before Latvia could adopt the euro, it had to meet five convergence criteria set by the EU. An assessment by the European Central Bank (ECB) in April 2012 found that Latvia met three of the five criteria. The Latvian Finance Minister announced in December 2012 that since convergence checks were only conducted biennially, an extraordinary report would be requested in February 2013, but in January 2013 Prime Minister Dombrovskis stated that for "technical reasons" the request had been delayed until March. However, he was confident that Latvia was "fulfilling the Maastricht euro adoption criteria with a considerable reserve, therefore I don't see any basis on which this convergence report would be negative." The Latvian government formally applied for a convergence check at the beginning of March, and the resulting convergence report, published on 5 June 2013 by the European Commission, concluded that "the Commission considers that Latvia fulfils the conditions for the adoption of the euro." The ECB simultaneously published a report which noted that "Latvia is within the reference values of the convergence criteria". Latvia's adoption of the euro, a legal obligation now that the convergence criteria have been met, was given final approval by the Economic and Financial Affairs Council on 9 July, and the lats was replaced with the euro on 1 January 2014. The Euro switchover ceremony took place at a site where Latvia's crisis began – the former headquarters of the collapsed Parex bank, now headquarters of state-owned Citatele bank, which emerged from Parex's ruins.

=== Status ===
Convergence criteria
Assessment date	Country	HICP inflation rate (Note: The rate of change of the 12-month average HICP over the prior 12-month average must be no more than 1.5% larger than the unweighted arithmetic average of the similar HICP inflation rates in the 3 EU member states with the lowest HICP inflation. If any of these 3 states have a HICP rate significantly below the similarly averaged HICP rate for the eurozone (which according to ECB practice means more than 2% below), and if this low HICP rate has been primarily caused by exceptional circumstances (i.e. severe wage cuts or a strong recession), then such a state is not included in the calculation of the reference value and is replaced by the EU state with the fourth lowest HICP rate.)	Excessive deficit procedure		Exchange rate		Long-term interest rate (Note: The arithmetic average of the annual yield of 10-year government bonds as of the end of the past 12 months must be no more than 2.0% larger than the unweighted arithmetic average of the bond yields in the 3 EU member states with the lowest HICP inflation. If any of these states have bond yields which are significantly larger than the similarly averaged yield for the eurozone (which according to previous ECB reports means more than 2% above) and at the same time does not have complete funding access to financial markets (which is the case for as long as a government receives bailout funds), then such a state is not to be included in the calculation of the reference value.)	Compatibility of legislation
Assessment date	Country	HICP inflation rate	Budget deficit to GDP	Debt-to-GDP ratio	ERM II member	Change in rate (Note: The change in the annual average exchange rate against the euro.)	Long-term interest rate	Compatibility of legislation
2012 ECB Report (Note: Reference values from the ECB convergence report of May 2012.)	Reference values	Max. 3.1% (Note: Sweden, Ireland and Slovenia were the reference states.) (as of 31 Mar 2012)	None open (as of 31 Mar 2012)		Min. 2 years (as of 31 Mar 2012)	Max. ±15% (Note: The maximum allowed change in rate is ± 2.25% for Denmark.) (for 2011)	Max. 5.80% (Note: Sweden and Slovenia were the reference states, with Ireland excluded as an outlier.) (as of 31 Mar 2012)	Compliant (as of 31 Mar 2012)
2012 ECB Report	Reference values	Max. 3.1% (as of 31 Mar 2012)	Max. 3.0% (FY 2011)	Max. 60% (FY 2011)	Min. 2 years (as of 31 Mar 2012)	Max. ±15% (for 2011)	Max. 5.80% (as of 31 Mar 2012)	Compliant (as of 31 Mar 2012)
2012 ECB Report	Latvia	4.1%	Open		6 years, 11 months	0.3%	5.77%	No
2012 ECB Report	Latvia	4.1%	3.5%	42.6%	6 years, 11 months	0.3%	5.77%	No
2013 ECB Report (Note: Reference values from the ECB convergence report of June 2013.)	Reference values	Max. 2.7% (Note: Sweden, Latvia and Ireland were the reference states.) (as of 30 Apr 2013)	None open (as of 30 Apr 2013)		Min. 2 years (as of 30 Apr 2013)	Max. ±15% (for 2012)	Max. 5.5% (as of 30 Apr 2013)	Compliant (as of 30 Apr 2013)
2013 ECB Report	Reference values	Max. 2.7% (as of 30 Apr 2013)	Max. 3.0% (FY 2012)	Max. 60% (FY 2012)	Min. 2 years (as of 30 Apr 2013)	Max. ±15% (for 2012)	Max. 5.5% (as of 30 Apr 2013)	Compliant (as of 30 Apr 2013)
2013 ECB Report	Latvia	1.3%	Open (Closed in June 2013)		8 years	1.3%	3.84%	Yes
2013 ECB Report	Latvia	1.3%	1.2%	40.7%	8 years	1.3%	3.84%	Yes

Criterion fulfilled
Criterion potentially fulfilled: If the budget deficit exceeds the 3% limit, but is "close" to this value (the European Commission has deemed 3.5% to be close by in the past), then the criteria can still potentially be fulfilled if either the deficits in the previous two years are significantly declining towards the 3% limit, or if the excessive deficit is the result of exceptional circumstances which are temporary in nature (i.e. one-off expenditures triggered by a significant economic downturn, or by the implementation of economic reforms that are expected to deliver a significant positive impact on the government's future fiscal budgets). However, even if such "special circumstances" are found to exist, additional criteria must also be met to comply with the fiscal budget criterion. Additionally, if the debt-to-GDP ratio exceeds 60% but is "sufficiently diminishing and approaching the reference value at a satisfactory pace" it can be deemed to be in compliance.
Criterion not fulfilled

== Failed calls for a referendum ==
Some members of Latvia's parliament, the Saeima, originally pushed for a referendum on euro adoption, but Latvian Prime Minister Valdis Dombrovskis argued that a referendum is unnecessary because Latvians already voted in favour of their EU accession treaty in 2003, which binds them to adopt the euro as soon as the country is found to comply with all the convergence criteria. He argued that, given the legal obligation, a referendum could only serve to delay or prevent euro adoption. According to Latvian law, if more than 1/3 of all members of parliament object to a bill, and propose an alternative bill within two weeks of the original bill being passed by parliament, a referendum can be called to allow the public to decide between the two bills. On 31 January 2013, the Latvian parliament passed its "euro adoption bill". Four days later, the biggest opposition party, Harmony Center, stated that it would not support the alternative "referendum bill", which was tabled by the other opposition party, Union of Greens and Farmers. Shortly after this, on 9 February, the referendum proposal had only gathered the support of 4 out of the Saeima's 100 members. These MPs stated that they would turn to the last remaining legal option to force a referendum: gathering a petition of at least 30,000 electoral signatories. Latvia officially requested an extraordinary convergence report to assess their readiness for euro adoption on 4 March 2013. Latvia's Central Election Commission rejected the proposed referendum on 18 March, as the proposed bill was considered not to comply with the Latvian constitution or Latvia's international obligations.

== Roadmap for euro adoption ==
A draft law outlining the euro switchover process was presented by the government's cabinet on 6 November 2012. It specified that:

- ATMs would stop distributing Lats from 1 January 2014.
- Both Lats and Euros would be in circulation for two weeks.
- Post offices would offer free exchange for a month (this was later extended to three months).
- All shops would be required to have dual price displays for three months before and until six months after the adoption.

The law was passed on 31 January 2013.

Euro adoption day	Changeover plan	Introduction	Frontloading	Dual circulation period	Exchange of LVL coins period	Dual price display	Mint company	Currency circulated (in units)
1 January 2014	A changeover law was passed 31 Jan 2013	Big-Bang	Bank and credit institutions starts receiving euro banknotes and coins 2 months before €-day. Retailers also receive coins and banknotes ahead of €-day, between 10 and 27 Dec.2013.	2 weeks	Post-offices: 3 months Banks: 6 months Central bank: Indefinitely	1 October 2013 until 30 June 2014	Stuttgart Mint	87 million banknotes and 400 million coins

== Linguistic issues ==
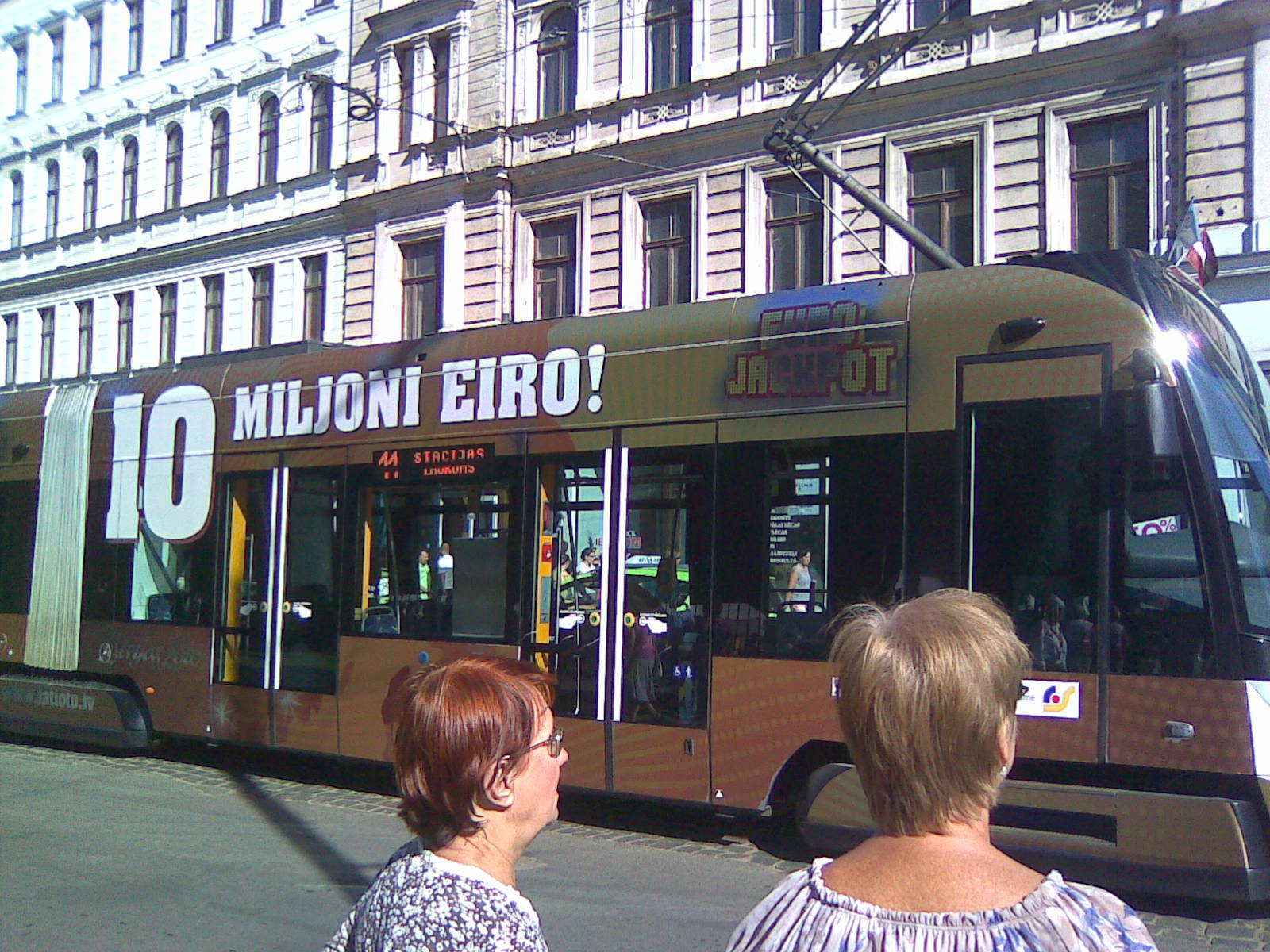
Advertising on a tram using the word 'eiro' for the euro.

The Latvian Parliament adopted on 26 July 2005 "Regulation Nr.564", outlining that the official Latvian name of the euro currency would be "eiro". In December 2007 the regulation was amended, so that the name in all legal matters would be "euro" and in all non-legal matters "eiro". The ECB was asked to approve this special naming convention, but declined on 13 November 2012 and asked Latvia to repeal either the entire regulation or at least the paragraph that granted the euro currency a special Latvian name. On 4 March 2013, the Latvian Ministry of Justice clarified that while the official name of the currency for all financial and legal documents shall be "euro", the public will continue to be able to use the Latvian name "eiro", furthermore it is required to write "euro" in italics indicating the word is in a foreign language.

== Latvian euro coins ==
Latvian euro coins feature three separate designs on the national side, which were publicised in July 2006 on the home page of the National Bank of Latvia. The designs featured were the Latvian maiden, which was featured on the 5 lats coin prior to World War II, on the 1 and 2 euro coins, the greater coat of arms of Latvia on the 10, 20 and 50-cent coins, and the lesser Coat of arms of Latvia on the 1, 2 and 5-cent coins. Originally, it was planned that the Freedom Monument would be featured on the 2 euro coin, but the original design did not meet the regulations of the ECB since it reached out into the ring of the coin and changed one of the stars. Latvia decided that a changed design of the monument would not be as recognisable and decided to use the Latvian maiden, used on the 1 euro coin, on the 2 euro coin as well.

== See also ==
- 2004 enlargement of the European Union
- Latvian euro coins
- Latvian lats
- Enlargement of the eurozone
- International status and usage of the euro
- Economic and monetary union
- History of the euro
- European Currency Unit
- European Central Bank
- European Union
- European Economic Community
- History of Latvia
