= Lūsis =

Family name

Lūsis is a Latvian surname.

Notable people with this surname include:

- Gunārs Lūsis (born 1950), Latvian artist
- Helvijs Lūsis (born 1987), Latvian bobsledder
- Jānis Lūsis (1939–2020), Latvian athlete
- Voldemārs Lūsis (born 1974), Latvian athlete, son of Jānis

== See also ==
- Lusis, a 1992 album by Christian industrial band Mortal
