= Milda =

Milda may refer to:

- Milda (mythology), Lithuanian goddess of love and of freedom
- Milda, Germany, a municipality in Thuringia, Germany
- Milda (gastropod), a genus of sea snails
- Milda (given name), a female given name
- Nickname of the Freedom Monument in Riga, Latvia
