= Latvian lats =

Former currency of Latvia

Latvijas lats (Latvian)
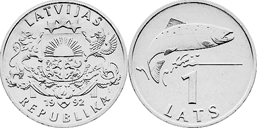
- The standard version of the Ls 1 coin depicted a salmon

ISO 4217
- Code: LVL

Unit
- Plural: lati (nom. pl.) or latu (gen. pl.)
- Symbol: ℒ︁𝓈 (first lats) Ls (second lats)

Denominations
- Subunit
- 1/100: santīms
- Plural
- santīms: santīmi (nom. pl.) or santīmu (gen. pl.)
- Symbol
- santīms: s
- Banknotes
- Freq. used: Ls 5, Ls 10, Ls 20, Ls 50, Ls 100
- Rarely used: Ls 500
- Coins
- Freq. used: 1 s, 2 s, 5 s, 10 s, 20 s, 50 s, Ls 1, Ls 2

Demographics
- Replaced: Latvian ruble (1 LVL = 200 LVR)
- Replaced by: Euro (1 EUR = 0.702804 LVL)
- User(s): None, previously: Latvia

Issuance
- Central bank: Bank of Latvia
- Website: www.bank.lv

Valuation
- Inflation: -0.4%
- Source: ECB, April 2013

EU Exchange Rate Mechanism (ERM)
- Since: 2 May 2005
- Fixed rate since: 1 January 2005
- Replaced by euro, non cash: 1 January 2014
- Replaced by euro, cash: 15 January 2014
- 1 € =: Ls 0.702804 (Irrevocable)
- This infobox shows the latest status before this currency was rendered obsolete.

The Latvian lats (plural: lati, plural genitive: latu, second Latvian lats ISO 4217 currency code: LVL) was the currency of Latvia from 1922 until 1940 and from 1993 until it was replaced by the euro on 1 January 2014. A two-week transition period during which the lats was in circulation alongside the euro ended on 14 January 2014. The lats is abbreviated as Ls and was subdivided into 100 santīmi (singular: santīms; from French centime), abbreviated as an s after the santīm amount.

The Latvian lats has been recognized as one of the 99 entries of the Latvian Culture Canon.

== First lats, 1922–1940 ==
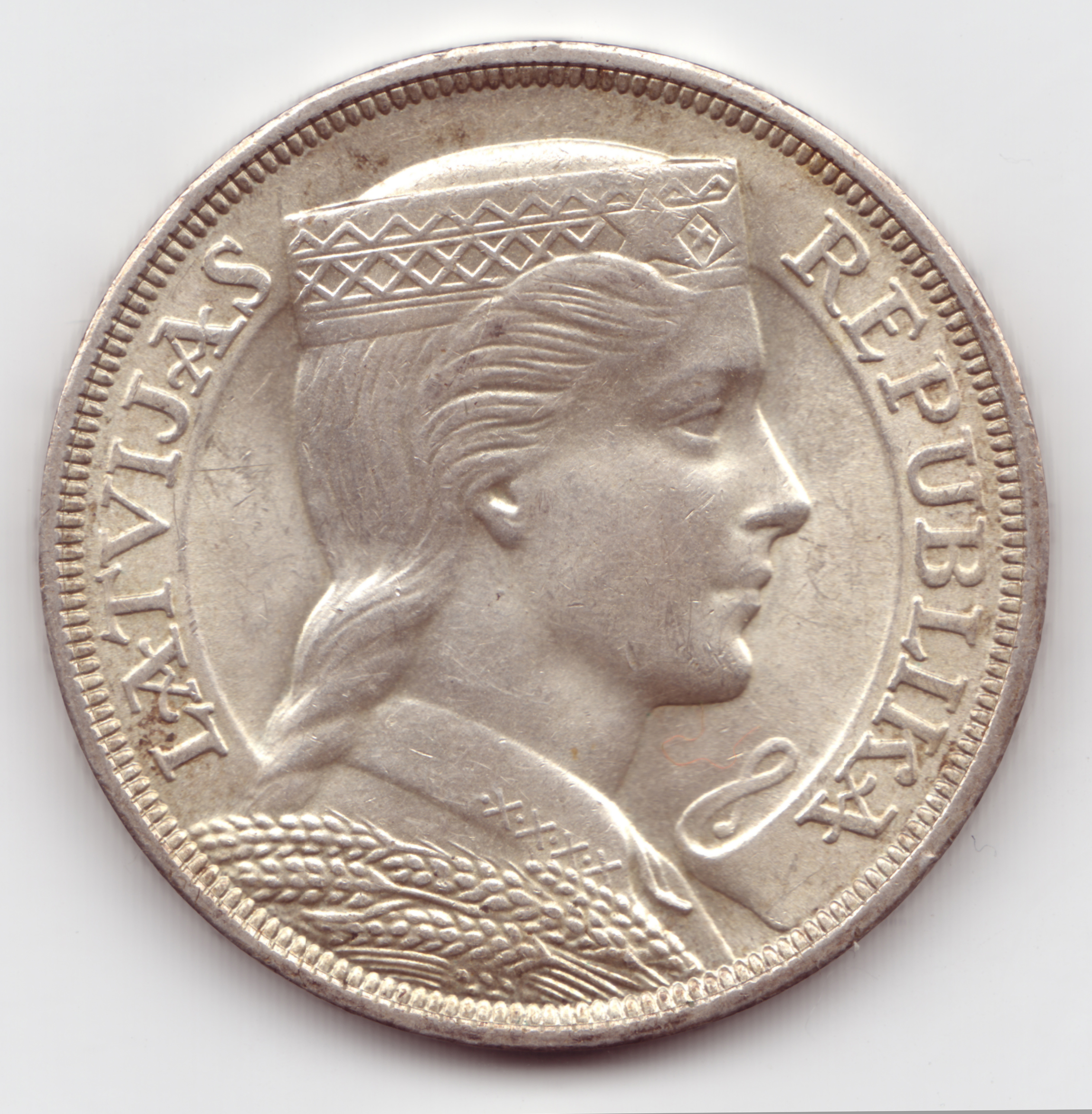
The ℒ︁𝓈 5 coin, introduced on Christmas of 1929, became a popular symbol of independence during the Soviet era. The coin was designed by Rihards Zariņš.

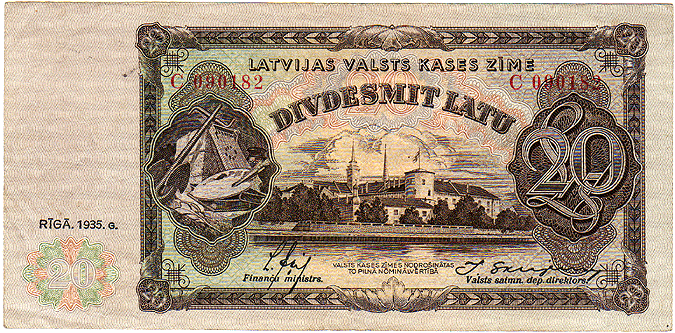
ℒ︁𝓈 20 banknote issued 1935 (obverse).

The first lats (symbol: ℒ︁𝓈) was first introduced on 3 August 1922, replacing the first Latvian ruble at a rate of ℒ︁𝓈 1 = Rbls 50. The lats was pegged against the gold standard from its introduction until 28 September 1936, when it was pegged against the British pound sterling at a rate of 1 £ = 25,22 ℒ︁𝓈. However, as the pound still retained the standard, a link of sorts existed until 1940. As Formally, the peg against the pound was in effect until 26 September 1939, when it was abolished to the decline of the pound due to the Second World War and the lats became a floating currency, regulated only if the exchange rate against the US dollar or the Swedish krona fluctuated for more than 5%.

On 17 June 1940, Latvia was occupied by the USSR. After the dismantling of the Bank of Latvia and its replacement with the Latvia Republican Office of the Gosbank on 10 October, the Soviet ruble was introduced alongside the lats on 25 November 1940 at par, although the real monetary value of the ruble was about a third of the lats. Thus both wages and prices were gradually raised to devalue the lats from June to November 1940. To lessen the effect of the exodus of goods sent by Soviet occupational personnel to the USSR, taking advantage of the new exchange rate, buyer limits for various goods were introduced.

Although the Soviet authorities initially pledged not to abolish the lats, it was taken out of circulation without prior warning at 13:05 on 25 March 1941, simultaneously nationalising all deposits larger than ℒ︁𝓈 1000. A part of the Latvian gold, silver and currency reserves were sent to Moscow at the start of the occupation.

=== Coins ===
Coins were issued in denominations of 1, 2, 5, 10, 20 and 50 santīmu, ℒ︁𝓈 1, ℒ︁𝓈 2 and ℒ︁𝓈 5. The 1s, 2s and 5s were in bronze (Cu, Sn, Zn), the 10s, 20s and 50s were nickel, while coins of ℒ︁𝓈 1 and above were struck in silver, with a purity of 83,5 percent.

The 1s, 2s and 5s coins featured the nominal and issue year on the obverse, while the reverse featured the lesser coat of arms of Latvia with "LATVIJA" written on a ribbon below the shield. A new, simplified design of the 1s and 2s coins went into circulation from 1937, where the issue year was moved to the obverse and grain ears flanked the nominal, while the reverse moved the text above the coat of arms and replaced the ribbon with an oak leaf wreath. The 10s and 20s coins had a similar design – the obverse featured the nominal and a horizontal grain ear under it, while the reverse contained the lesser coat of arms, a ribbon with the name of the country in Latvian and the issue year. The 50s coin reverse was the same, but the obverse featured a Latvian maiden in traditional dress operating a rudder of a sailboat, with the nominal on the top right corner. The ℒ︁𝓈 1 and ℒ︁𝓈 2 coin obverse featured the nominal and the issue year with a ribbon-bound plant wreath under it, while the reverse – the greater coat of arms of Latvia with it official name "LATVIJAS REPUBLIKA" above and below it.

=== Banknotes ===
The Latvian Bank issued notes from 1922 in denominations of ℒ︁𝓈 20, ℒ︁𝓈 25, ℒ︁𝓈 50, ℒ︁𝓈 100 and ℒ︁𝓈 500. They also issued ℒ︁𝓈 10 notes which were 500 ruble notes overprinted with the new denomination. The government issued currency notes from 1925 in denominations of ℒ︁𝓈 5, ℒ︁𝓈 10, ℒ︁𝓈 20 and ℒ︁𝓈 100. The ℒ︁𝓈 500 note was issued in 1929. Most banknotes, particularly high-nominal ones, were printed in the United Kingdom from 1924 to 1938/1939, when production was switched to the State Mint in Riga.

== Second lats, 1993–2013 ==
The cost of one euro in Latvian lats (from 1999 till 2013).

The lats was reintroduced on 5 March 1993, replacing the Latvian ruble, which continued to circulate and kept validity until and including 30 June 1994 at a rate of LR 200 being equivalent to Ls 1. The Ls 5 banknote was introduced first, and the last banknote to be introduced was the Ls 500 banknote on 20 July 1998. The lats was replaced on 1 January 2014 by the euro, at the rate of Ls 0.702804 to €1. The second lats can be exchanged to euros at the official rate at the Bank of Latvia's cashier's office in Riga.

Until the end of its circulation in January 2014, the lats was the fourth highest-valued currency unit per face value, after the Kuwaiti dinar, Bahraini dinar, and the Omani rial. The Ls 500 note was the world's third most valuable banknote after the $10,000 Brunei/Singaporean dollar note and the 1,000 Swiss franc note. With the abolition of the Maltese lira on 1 January 2008, the lats became the most valued European currency.

=== Coins ===
Coins were issued in denominations of 1s, 2s, 5s, 10s, 20s and 50s, Ls 1 and Ls 2. Besides standard coins in the list below and coins for collectors, the following coins were also issued: three commemorative circulation coins were issued in denominations of Ls 2, Ls 10 and Ls 100 (the latter two of which were, respectively, silver and gold), a Ls 100 gold bullion coin, and a series of limited design Ls1 coins twice a year from 2004 to 2013, and once in 2001 and 2003.

The initial standard Ls 2 coin was issued only once in 1992, it was a copper-nickel coin of 6g and measured 24.35mm in diameter. It was gradually replaced in circulation from 1999 with the below bimetallic coin due to counterfeiting issues.

The standard coins were designed by Gunārs Lūsis and Jānis Strupulis.

Coins of the Latvian lats (1992–1999) Designers: Gunārs Lūsis and Jānis Strupulis
Image	Value	Technical parameters			Description			Issued from
Image	Value	Diameter (mm)	Mass (g)	Composition	Edge	Obverse	Reverse	Issued from
	1 s	15.65	1.60	Copper-plated iron	Smooth	Smaller coat of arms; year of issue; Lettering: LATVIJAS REPUBLIKA	Five arches; two suns; value	1992–2008
	2 s	17.00	1.90	Copper-plated iron	Smooth	Smaller coat of arms; year of issue; Lettering: LATVIJAS REPUBLIKA	Five arches; two suns; value	1992–2009
	5 s	18.50	2.50	Nickel silver	Smooth	Smaller coat of arms; year of issue; Lettering: LATVIJAS REPUBLIKA	Five arches; two suns; value	1992–2009
	10 s	19.90	3.25	Nickel silver	Smooth	Smaller coat of arms; year of issue; Lettering: LATVIJAS REPUBLIKA	Five arches; two suns; value	1992–2008
	20 s	21.50	4.00	Nickel silver	Smooth	Smaller coat of arms; year of issue; Lettering: LATVIJAS REPUBLIKA	Five arches; two suns; value	1992–2009
	50 s	18.80	3.50	Cupronickel	Reeded	Smaller coat of arms; year of issue; Lettering: LATVIJAS REPUBLIKA	Pine sapling; value	1992–2009
	Ls 1	21.75	4.80	Cupronickel	Lettering: LATVIJAS BANKA • LATVIJAS BANKA •	Greater coat of arms; year of issue; Lettering: LATVIJAS REPUBLIKA	Leaping salmon; value	1992–2008
	Ls 2	24.35	6.00	Cupronickel	Lettering: LATVIJAS BANKA • LATVIJAS BANKA •	Greater coat of arms; year of issue; Lettering: LATVIJAS REPUBLIKA	Cow; value	1992
	Ls 2	26.30	4.50	Outer: Cupronickel	Reeded lettering: LATVIJAS BANKA • LATVIJAS BANKA •	Greater coat of arms; year of issue; Lettering: LATVIJAS REPUBLIKA	Cow; value	1999–2009
	Ls 2	18.21	5.00	Inner: Nickel silver	Reeded lettering: LATVIJAS BANKA • LATVIJAS BANKA •	Greater coat of arms; year of issue; Lettering: LATVIJAS REPUBLIKA	Cow; value	1999–2009
Relative size of coins

=== Banknotes ===
All banknotes are 130 × 65 mm in size. They were printed by Giesecke & Devrient GmbH in Germany and were designed by Imants Žodžiks and Valdis Ošiņš.

Banknotes of the Latvian lats (1992) Designers: Imants Žodžiks and Valdis Ošiņš
Image		Value	Euro equivalent	Dimensions (mm)	Main colour	Description		Issue
Obverse	Reverse	Value	Euro equivalent	Dimensions (mm)	Main colour	Obverse	Reverse	Issue
		Ls 5	€7.11	130 × 65	Green	Oak tree, sun ornament background	Sun woodcarving on a distaff	1992–2009
		Ls 10	€14.23	130 × 65	Purple	Bends of the River Daugava (Daugavas loki)	Latvian brooch (sakta)	1992–2008
		Ls 20	€28.46	130 × 65	Brown	Traditional homestead	Woven linen (dreļļu pattern)	1992–2009
		Ls 50	€71.14	130 × 65	Blue	Sailing-ship	Keys (Historical seal of Riga), Riga fortifications map	1992
		Ls 100	€142.29	130 × 65	Red	Krišjānis Barons	Lielvārde Belt (Lielvārdes josta)	1992–2007
		Ls 500	€711.44	130 × 65	Grey	Latvian folk-maid (Note: Similar to the 1929 silver five lats coin.)	Ornamental bronze crowns	1992–2008

== See also ==
- Bank of Latvia
- Adoption of the euro in Latvia
- Latvian euro coins
- Commemorative coins of Latvia
- Economy of Latvia
