= Jānis Strupulis =

Latvian sculptor and graphical designer

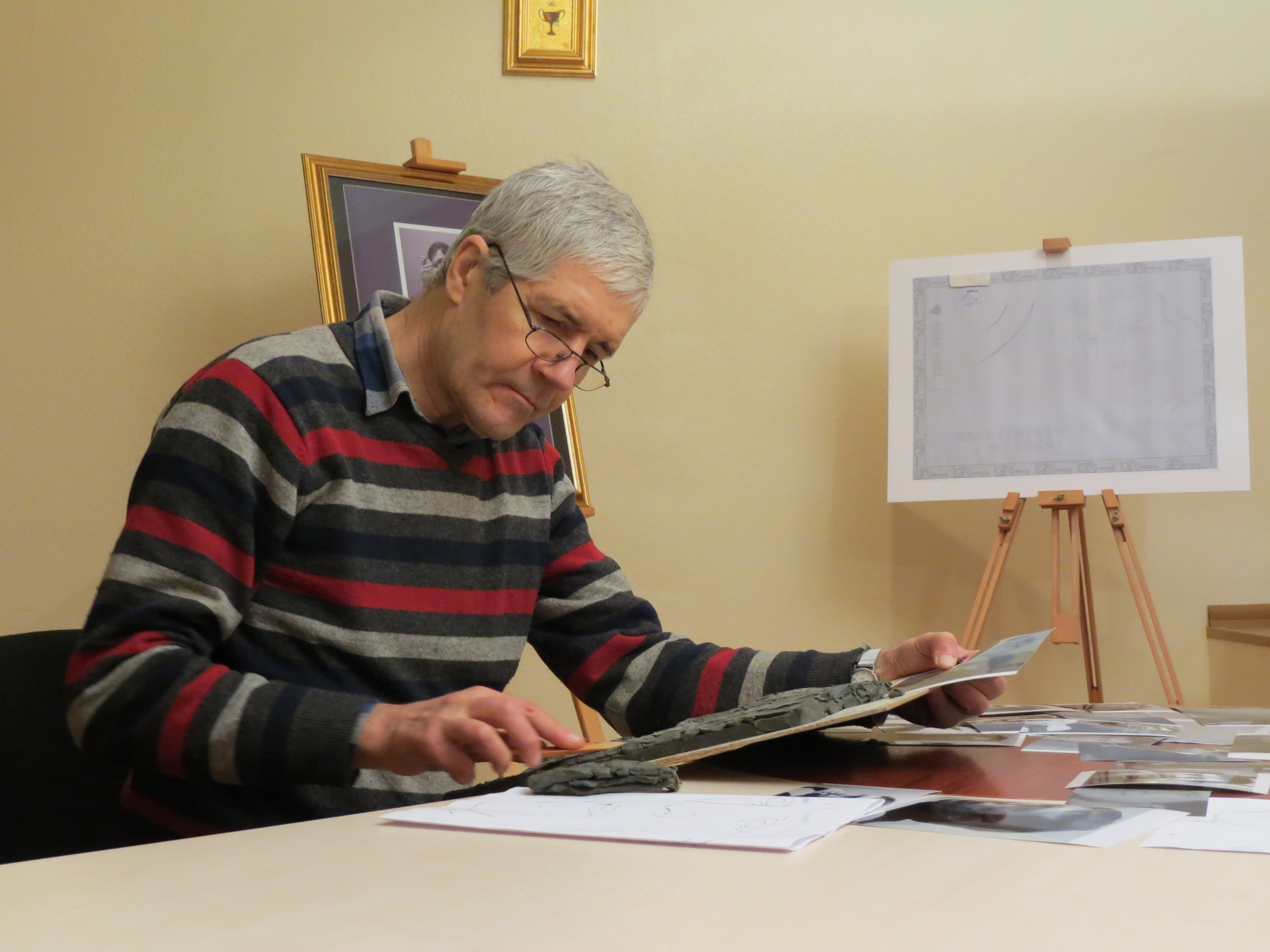
Jānis Strupulis

Jānis Strupulis (monogram JS, born 28 January 1949) is a Latvian sculptor and graphical designer, who designed some of the modern Latvian coins with denominations in Latvian lats.

== Life ==
Strupulis was born 28 January 1949 in Vecpiebalga. He graduated 1973 from the Art Academy of Latvia, Department of Sculpturing, and is a member of the Artists' Union of Latvia (Latvian: Latvijas Mākslinieku savienība) since 1978, and a member of the Latvian Designers' Society (Latvian: Latvijas Dizaineru savienība) since 1994. He is also member of FIDEM, president of the Latvian Arts Medal Club (Latvian: Latvijas Medaļu mākslas klubs) and honorary member of the Latvian Academy of Sciences.

== Works ==
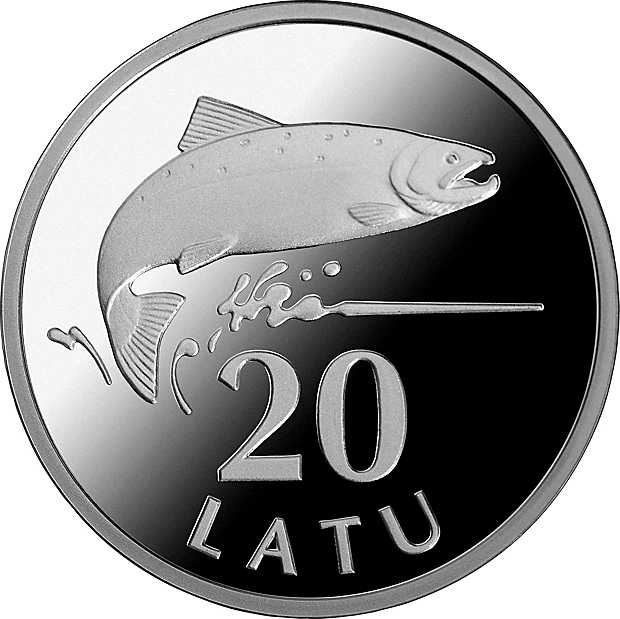
20 Latu silver coin

Strupulis has, in cooperation with Gunārs Lūsis, designed a number of Latvian coins with denominations in Lats dated 1992, the bi-metallic 2 Lats coin dated 1999, variations of the 1 Lats coins dated 1999, 2001, and many others.

Strupulis has been actively exhibiting his works since 1971. His main works are in the fields of medals, coins, pictures and drawings, and they have been displayed in more than a dozen countries, at more than 50 museums. He has created commemorative plaques in Riga for a number of notable persons, like: Ernst von Bergmann (2011), Johann Christoph Brotze (1996), as well as Ernests Brastiņš (2007, painter, 1892–1942), Herbert Tiemer (2006, architect, 1897–1938), Christoph Haberland (1994) and Aleksandrs Tīpainis (2006, postal official (1886–1974).

=== Prizes and awards ===
- 1986, 1989 Baltic Triennial Medal Art Prize
- 1997 Pauls Stradiņš Prize
- 1992, 1996 Dante Biennale Gold Medal
- 1995 Baltic Triennial Medal Art Award
