= Ten-baht coin =

Thai coin

10 baht
- Thailand
- Value: 10 Thai baht
- Mass: 8.5 g
- Diameter: 26 mm
- Thickness: 2 mm
- Edge: Reed
- Composition: Outer Ring: Cupronickel; Centre Plug: Aluminium bronze
- Years of minting: 1988–Present
- Catalog number: -

Obverse
- Design: King Vajiralongkorn
- Designer: Vudhichai Seangern
- Design date: 2018

Reverse
- Design: Royal Monogram of King Vajiralongkorn
- Designer: Chaiyod Soontrapa
- Design date: 2018

The bi-metallic Thailand ten-baht coin is a denomination coin of the Thai baht, the currency unit of Thailand.

Like every standard-issue coin in Thailand, its obverse features the King of Thailand, Vajiralongkorn Bodindradebayavarangkun and previously Bhumibol Adulyadej. The newest coin features King Vajiralongkorn's royal monogram on its reverse side while the previous set featured Wat Arun Ratchawararam Ratchawora Mahavihara seen from the Chao Phraya River.

Ten-baht coin has been used as a commemorative coin for many occasions since 1971. As of March 2012, there are one silver, twenty-three nickel, twenty-three cupronickel and fifty-eight bi-metallic face-valued ten-baht commemorative coin series.

== Features ==
Raised dots corresponding to Braille cell dot 1 and dots 2-4-5, which correspond to the number 10, are at the 12 o'clock position on the reverse of the standard-issue 10-baht coin. Braille enumeration does not appear on coins of other denominations, nor on ten-baht coins frequently issued as commemorative coins (for example, the 50th and 60th Anniversary of Accession to the Throne of King Bhumibol Adulyadej.)

The bi-metallic ten-baht coin is very similar to the two–euro coin, which first minted in 2002, in size, shape and weight and likewise consists of two different alloys. Vending machines that are not equipped with an up-to-date coin-checking system might therefore accept them as €2 coins. This similarity is because both coins are minted on the model of the defunct Italian 500 lire coin, the world's first modern bi-metallic coin. To mint its 10 baht coin in 1988, the Thai government had to be allowed by the Italian mint, which had an international copyright over bi-metallic minting. The 10 baht is a perfect copy of the 500 lire coin even in its alloy, being made of acmonital for the outer ring and bronzital for the centre plug, but slightly larger (26 mm to 25.80 mm) and heavier (8.5 g to 6.8 g).

== Series ==
=== 2009 changes ===
In 2009, a new series of Thai baht coins were released in circulation. The Ten-baht coin was issued for this series, the difference is the redesign of the portrait of King Bhumibol Adulyadej on the obverse, to reflect his current age. The reverse side remained the same from previous issues.

=== 2018 series ===
The Ministry of Finance announced on March 28, 2018 that the first coins featuring the portrait of His Majesty King Maha Vajiralongkorn Bodindradebayavarangkun will be put in circulation on April 6.

== Mintages ==
- 1988 ~ 60,200
- 1989 ~ 100,000,000
- 1990 ~ 100
- 1991 ~ 1,380,650
- 1992 ~ 13,805,000
- 1993 ~ 10,556,000
- 1994 ~ 150,598,831
- 1995 ~ 53,700,000
- 1996 ~ 17,086,000
- 1997 ~ 9,310,600
- 1998 ~ 980,000
- 1999 ~ 1,030,000
- 2000 ~ 1,666,000
- 2001 ~ 2,060,000
- 2002 ~ 61,180,000
- 2003 ~ 49,263,000
- 2004 ~ 38,591,000
- 2005 ~ 108,271,000
- 2006 ~ 109,703,000
- 2007 ~ 161,897,000
- 2008 (old series) ~ 209,800,000
- 2008 (new series) ~ 16,750,000
- 2009 ~ 41,657,733

== Design ==
See information box for standard issue, and see below for commemorative issues.

== Commemorative issues ==
=== Silver coin ===
- the 25th Anniversary Celebrations of the King Bhumibol Adulyadej's Accession

=== Nickel coin ===
- Commemoration of Crown Prince Vajiralongkorn's marriage ceremony
- Commemoration of Princess Sirindhorn graduated from Chulalongkorn University
- Commemoration of Princess Chulabhorn Walailak graduated from Kasetsart University
- the 80th Anniversary of Princess Mother Srinagarindra
- the 30th Anniversary of The World Fellowship of Buddhists
- Commemoration of the King Bhumibol Adulyadej's accession as two times as the King Mongkut
- the 50th Anniversary of the Queen Sirikit
- the 75th Anniversary of World Scout
- the Centenary of Thai Post
- the 700th Anniversary of Lai Su Thai (Thai script)
- the 84th Anniversary of Princess Mother Srinagarindra
- the 72nd Anniversary of Government Saving Bank
- the National Years of the Tree 1985-1987, Thailand
- the 5th Cycle Birthday of the King Bhumibol Adulyadej
- Rajamagalapisek Royal Ceremony
- the 6th ASEAN Orchid Congress
- Commemoration of the King Bhumibol Adulyadej for Outstanding Leadership in Rural Development
- the Centenary of Chulachomklao Royal Military Academy
- Commemoration of Princess Chulabhorn Walailak, the researcher princess
- the 72nd Anniversary of National Cooperatives
- the 36th Anniversary of Crown Prince Vajiralongkorn
- the Centenary of Siriraj Hospital
- the 72nd Anniversary of Chulalongkorn University

=== Cupronickel coin ===
- the 90th Anniversary of Princess Mother Srinagarindra
- the Centenary of the Siriraj Pattayakorn School
- the Centenary of the Comptroller General's Department
- the 36th Anniversary of Princess Sirindhorn
- the Centenary of Prince Mahidol Adulyadej
- the 80th Anniversary of Thai Scout
- Commemoration of Princess Mother Srinagarindra for her public health work
- the Centenary of Ministry of Interior
- the Centenary of Ministry of Justice
- Ramon Magsaysay Award: Public Service to Princess Sirindhorn
- the Centenary of Ministry of Agriculture and Cooperatives
- the 60th Anniversary of National Assembly of Thailand
- the 5th Cycle Birthday of the Queen Sirikit
- the 64th Anniversary of the King Bhumibol Adulyadej as the same age as the King Mongkut
- the 50th Anniversary of Bank of Thailand
- the Centenary of Thai Teacher Education
- the Centenary of the Thai Red Cross Society
- the 60th Anniversary of Treasury Department
- the Centenary of Office of the Attorney General
- the Centenary of the King Prajadhipok
- the 60th Anniversary of the Royal Institute
- the 60th Anniversary of Thammasat Universary
- the 120th Anniversary of the Privy Council and the Council of State

=== Bi-metallic coin ===
- FAO's Agricola Medal to the King Bhumibol Adulyadej
- the 50th Anniversary Celebrations of the King Bhumibol Adulyadej's Accession
- IRRI's International Rice Award Medal to the King Bhumibol Adulyadej
- the Centenary of the King Chulalongkorn's Europe visit
- Commemoration of the King Nangklao (Nangklao)
- the 13th Asian Games
- the 6th Cycle Birthday of the King Bhumibol Adulyadej
- the Centenary of the General Hospital
- the 125th Anniversary of Custom Department
- the Centenary of Thai Army Medicare
- the 50th Anniversary of Office of the National Economic and Social Development Board
- the 80th Anniversary of Ministry of Commerce
- the Centenary of Department of Lands
- the Centenary of Princess Mother Srinagarindra
- the 90th Anniversary of BMA Medical College & Vajira Hospital
- the 90th Anniversary of Department of Highways
- the Centenary of Royal Irrigation Department
- the 60th Anniversary of Department of Internal Trade
- the 20th World Scout Jamboree
- the 75th Anniversary of the King Bhumibol Adulyadej
- the 80th Anniversary of Princess Galyani Vadhana
- the Centenary of Inspector General Department, Royal Thai Army
- the 90th Anniversary of Government Savings Bank
- the 150th Anniversary of King Chulalogkorn
- the 11th APEC Summit
- the 70th Anniversary of the Royal Institute
- the 6th Cycle Birthday of the Queen Sirikit
- the Commemorative of Anti-Drug Campaign
- the 70th Anniversary of Thammasat University
- the Bicentenary of the King Mongkut
- the 3rd IUCN World Conservation Congress (Bangkok World Conservation Congress 2004)
- the 13th Meeting of the Convention on International Trade in Endangered Species of Wild Fauna and Flora
- the Centenary of Department of Army Transportation
- the 72nd Anniversary of Treasury Department
- the 72nd Anniversary of the Secretariat of the Cabinet
- the 80th Anniversary of Princess Bejaratana
- the 25th Asia-Pacific Scout Jamboree
- Commemoration of the Blessing and Naming Rites of Prince Dipangkorn Rasmijoti
- the 130th Anniversary of Office of the Auditor General of Thailand
- the 60th Anniversary Celebrations of the King Bhumibol Adulyadej's Accession
- the 150th Anniversary of Prince Chaturonrasmi
- the Centenary of Judge Advocate General's Department
- Commemorative of WHO's Food Safety Award to the Queen Sirikit
- the Centenary of the 1st Cavalry Regiment, King's Guard
- the Centenary of Siam Commercial Bank
- the 50th Anniversary of the Medical Technology Council
- the 24th Summer Universiade
- the 75th Anniversary of the Queen Sirikit
- the 9th Congress of International Association of Supreme Administrative Jurisdictions
- the 80th Anniversary of the King Bhumibol Adulyadej
- the 24th SEA Games
- the 120th Anniversary of Siriraj Hospital
- the 125th Anniversary of Thailand Post
- the 50th Anniversary of National Research Council of Thailand
- the 84th Anniversary of HRH Princess Bejaratana Rajasuda
- the 60th Anniversary of Office of the National Economic and Social Development Board
- the 120th Anniversary of The Comptroller General’s Department
- the 100th Anniversary of The Fine Arts Department
