= Herbert Tiemer =

Baltic German architect, inventor and entrepreneur (1879–1938)

- Born: Herbert Gustav Tiemer; 25 March 1879; Riga
- Died: 24 October 1938 (aged 59); Berlin
- Occupations: Architect, inventor and entrepreneur

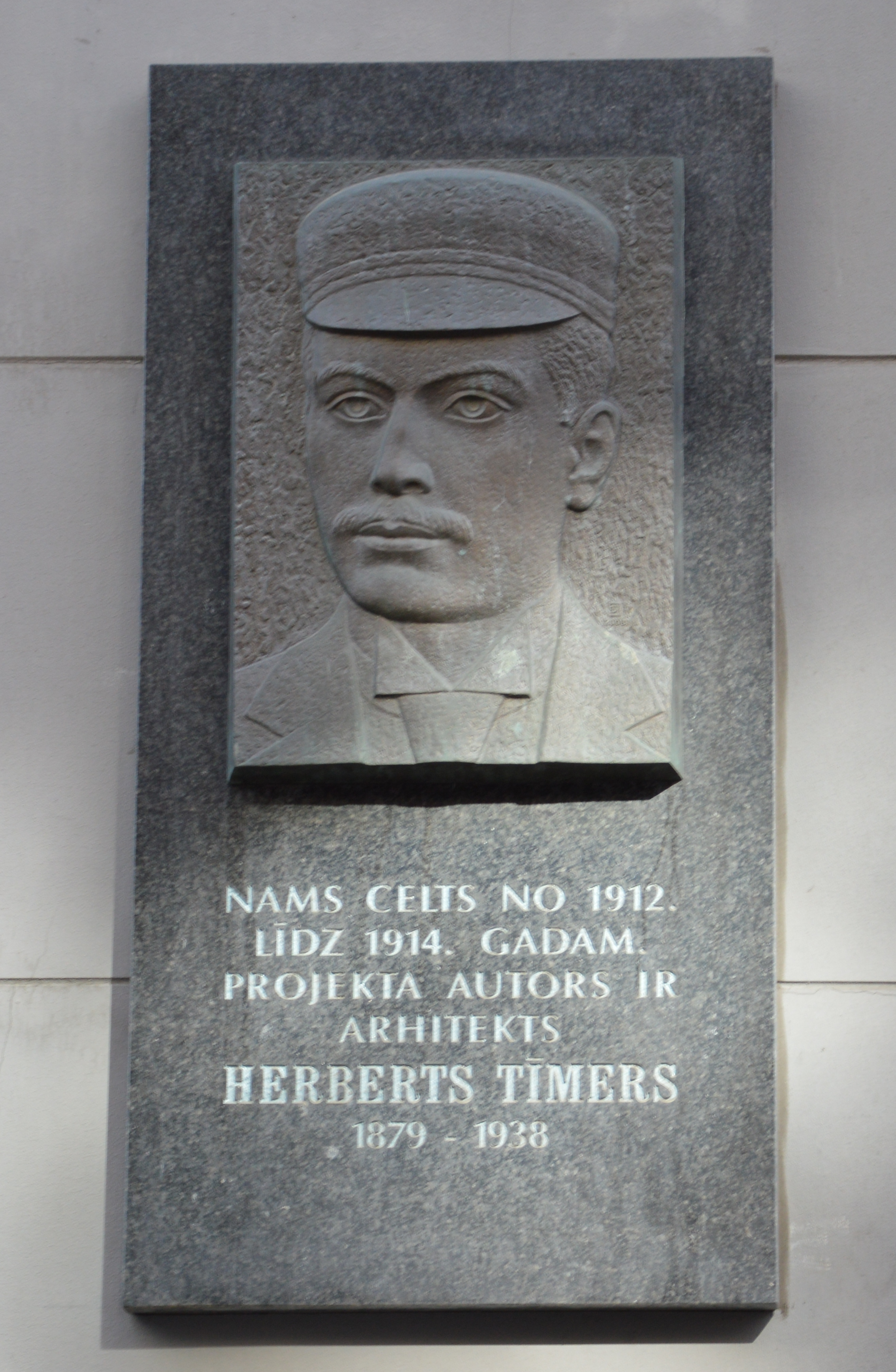
Memorial plaque on the building at 3 Vaļņu iela in Riga

Herbert Gustav Tiemer (Latvian: Herberts Tīmers; 25 March 1879 (Note: Older accounts, including earlier versions of the German-language article, give 6 March 1879. The printed album of Fraternitas Baltica and the Baltisches biografisches Lexikon digital both give 25 March 1879.) – 24 October 1938) was a Baltic German architect, inventor and entrepreneur. He operated his own architectural practice in Riga from 1909 to 1914. His documented work in the city comprises ten buildings, including four detached houses in Mežaparks. After moving to Germany, Tiemer was involved in several Berlin companies. He also devised the numerical language system Timerio and a construction toy made from reused packaging boxes.

== Family ==
Tiemer's father was Heinrich Tiemer, a Riga merchant, city councillor and alderman; his mother was Johanna Luise, née Bierich. His brothers Paul Tiemer (born 1866) and Robert John Tiemer (1868–1916) were physicians.

Tiemer married Elisabeth "Else" Waldhauer (1885–1971), who was also born in Riga. She was a daughter of the Riga physician Werner Robert Waldhauer, a granddaughter of the ophthalmologist Carl Friedrich Werner Michael Waldhauer, and a cousin of the archaeologist Oskar Waldhauer. They had a son, Werner Tiemer (1909–1970), and two daughters, Gerda Else (1912–2002) and Irmela Wojna (1915–1994).

== Education and work in Riga ==
Tiemer attended the Realschule in Riga and began studying mechanical engineering at the Riga Polytechnical Institute in 1898, where he was assigned matriculation number 5738. He was admitted to the student fraternity Fraternitas Baltica as member no. 329 in March 1899. From 1900 to 1907 he studied architecture at the institute. During its closure following the 1905 Revolution, he continued his studies at the Technical University of Karlsruhe, now the Karlsruhe Institute of Technology.

On 30 January 1907, Tiemer passed the state examination in the institute's architecture department. From 1909 to 1914 he ran his own architectural practice in Riga. Architectural historians classify his buildings primarily as examples of rationalist Art Nouveau and neoclassical tendencies in Riga's architecture.

Tiemer served in the Imperial Russian Army from 1914 to 1917. In January 1919 he fled to Germany and settled in Berlin.

== Business activities in Berlin ==
On 15 October 1919, the merchant Eduard Lion, architect Herbert Tiemer and engineer Henryk Lion established the general partnership Lion & Tiemer in Berlin. The commercial-register notice continued to identify Tiemer as an architect and gave Charlottenburg as his place of residence. The partnership was dissolved and removed from the register in 1922.

In November 1922, Tiemer and the engineer Gottlieb von Lilienfeld became members of the board of the newly formed Offerten-Kontor Aktiengesellschaft. The company was intended to broker offers and requests relating to goods, instruction, businesses, land, buildings and addresses. By May 1924, Tiemer and Lilienfeld were no longer board members.

From 1 January 1927, Tiemer, described as a graduate engineer, was a partner in the Berum-Plan-Gesellschaft von Rautenfeld, von Zimmermann und Tiemer. The register notice also named the director Victor Berens von Rautenfeld and graduate engineer Wilhelm von Zimmermann, but did not state the purpose of the business.

Proposal for high-rise buildings above Berlin's Spree canals, jointly credited to Tiemer and F. Schüler, 1929

On 6 January 1929 the Berliner Illustrirte Zeitung printed a proposal by Tiemer and F. Schüler for high-rise buildings above Berlin's Spree canals. The accompanying article argued that building over urban waterways could reconcile the competing needs of large cities for building land and traffic space, and described towers with boat landings, south-facing sun terraces, a swimming pool, a roof garden and cafés above the water.

== Timerio and inventions ==
In 1921, Tiemer presented Timerio, a system intended for written communication between speakers of different languages. About 7,000 words were assigned numbers; according to a contemporary account, additional typographic signs expanded the system to approximately 12,000 concepts. The newspaper Vorwärts described the system as simply constructed, but observed that users would always need a printed key. In 1922, Timerio was registered by Lion & Tiemer as word mark no. 288720 for printed matter, playing cards, teaching materials and other goods.

Tiemer also registered several practical and design concepts. In 1921, a "merchandise package with advertising" was protected for Lion & Tiemer, and a trouser holder was protected for Herbert Tiemer. In May 1925, the firm Herbert Tiemer deposited seven designs for covering boxes, rolls and other packages with images resembling building materials.

Tiemer's Polish patent no. 6456 described a construction toy that used discarded match, cigarette and other packaging boxes as building blocks. Images of brick, stone, windows and doors were pasted onto the boxes to make them resemble building components; the specification also described columns, vaults and complete buildings made from the boxes. The application was filed on 14 August 1925, the patent was granted on 1 December 1926, and it was published on 10 January 1928.

== Death ==
Tiemer died in Berlin on 24 October 1938. On 1 November 1938, the convention and alumni association of Fraternitas Baltica published a death notice in the Rigasche Rundschau.

== Buildings in Riga ==
The following list combines the four detached houses in the catalogue of Krastiņš's 1997 book on Mežaparks with the six central-Riga buildings in the catalogue of his 1980 book on Art Nouveau. Dates and original uses follow the cited catalogue pages.

Corner view of the 1909 residential and commercial building at 61 Krišjāņa Valdemāra iela. Rough natural-stone facing contrasts with smooth and grooved plaster, bay windows and asymmetrically placed balconies.

Projecting balconies, grooved plaster and narrow brick bands on the Hanzas iela façade.

Image	Year	Present address	Historical or former name	Original use and client, where published	Source
	1909	23 Hamburgas iela	Hamburger Straße 23	Detached house for E. Bernhards	
61 Krišjāņa Valdemāra iela	1909	61 Krišjāņa Valdemāra iela	Gorkija iela 61 in the 1980 catalogue	Residential and commercial building	
7 Gdaņskas iela	1910	7 Gdaņskas iela	Danziger Straße 7	Detached house for H. Hedvigs	
	1910	9 Gdaņskas iela	Danziger Straße 9	Detached house for F. Dībolds	
	1910	10 Ščecinas iela	Stettiner Straße 10	Detached house for E. Žukovska	
	1911	21 Merķeļa iela	—	Residential and commercial building	
13 Baznīcas iela	1911	13 Baznīcas iela	Veidenbauma iela 13 in the 1980 catalogue	Residential and commercial building	
22 Hospitāļu iela	1911	22 Hospitāļu iela	Hospitalstraße 22	Residential building	
Courtyard	1913	3 Vaļņu iela	Wallstraße 3	Residential and commercial building; constructed 1912–1914	
24 Kaļķu iela	1914	24 Kaļķu iela	Ļeņina iela 24 in the 1980 catalogue; historically Kalkstraße 24	Apartments, shops, offices and a cinema; constructed 1913–1917 with Maksis Deibners (Max Deubner, 1884–1947)	

Since 2006, the building at 3 Vaļņu iela has carried a memorial plaque to Tiemer designed by Jānis Strupulis.
