= 5 lats coin =

Latvian coin minted 1929–1932

𝓛︁𝓼 5
- Latvia
- Value: 5 Latvian lats
- Mass: 25 g
- Diameter: 37 mm
- Edge: Inscription "DIEVS SVĒTĪ LATVIJU" (God bless Latvia) with words separated by three six point stars
- Composition: 0.8350 silver, 0.165 copper
- Silver: 0.6711 troy oz
- Years of minting: 1929–1932

Obverse
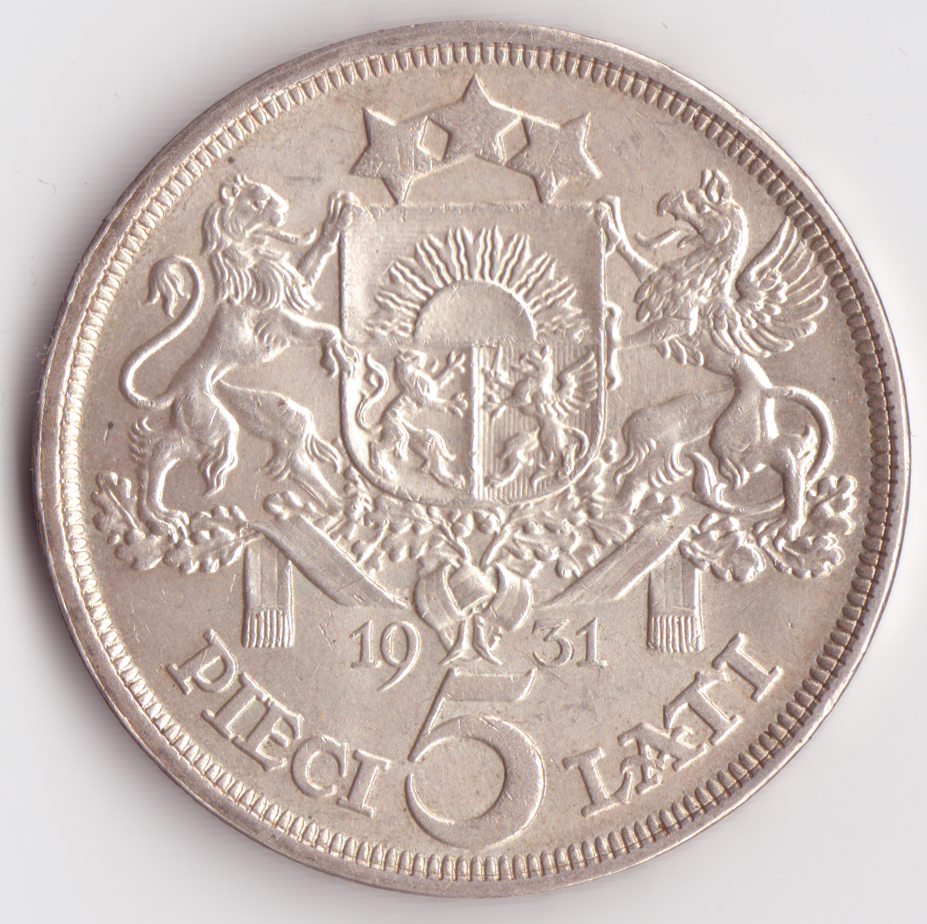
- Design: The large Coat of arms of Latvia. Denomination and year of issue inscription PIECI LATI (five lats)
- Designer: Rihards Zariņš

Reverse
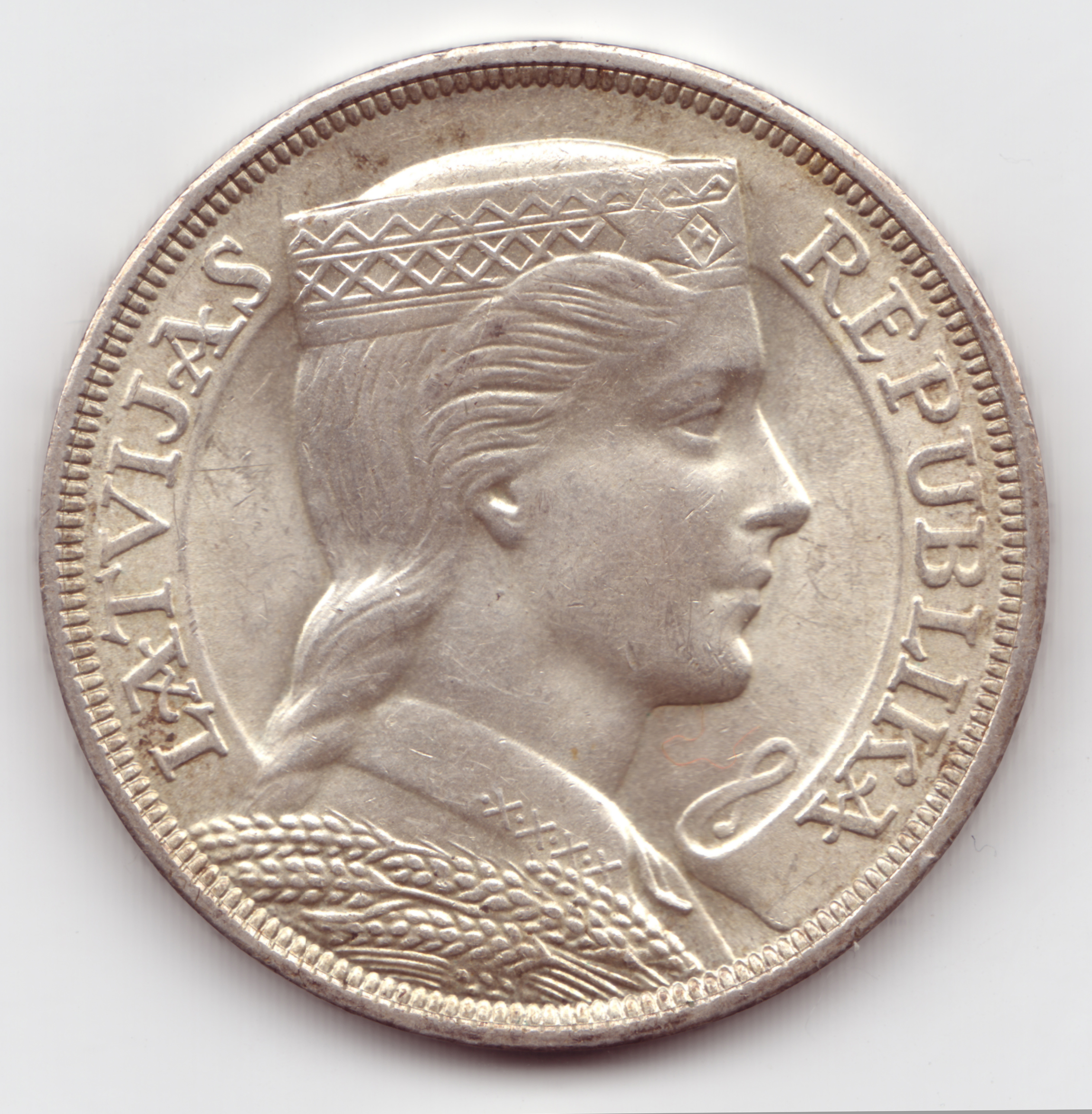
- Design: Maiden in stylized folk costume with ears of grain over her shoulder. Inscription LATVIJAS REPUBLIKA (Republic of Latvia)
- Designer: Rihards Zariņš

The 5 lats coin was a Latvian lat coin minted in 1929, 1931 and 1932. It became a popular symbol of independence during the Soviet occupation of Latvia. It was reproduced in several modern commemorative coins of Latvia and is used on the national sides of the Latvian 1 and 2 euro coins. The reverse design was featured on the Ls 500 banknote and in watermarks of all lats banknotes.

== History ==
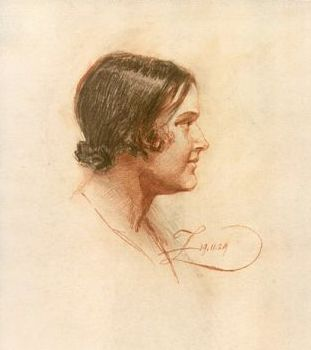
Zelma Brauere, the model depicted on the coin

In February 1929, the Latvian Ministry of Finance decided to issue a ℒ︁𝓈 5 circulation coin depicting the head of a maiden, which would symbolize the Republic of Latvia and freedom. The coin was designed by Rihards Zariņš. The image of the maiden on the coin is colloquially known as Milda (a Latvian female name). The model was Zelma Brauere (1900-1977), a proofreader of the State Securities Printing House. She served as a model for other works of the artist, including the ℒ︁𝓈 10 and ℒ︁𝓈 20 banknotes and the 50s coin.

In 1939, the Latvian government prepared to mint new ℒ︁𝓈 5 coins to be issued in 1941. The Latvian maiden was to be replaced by a portrait of the authoritarian leader of Latvia, Kārlis Ulmanis. Although mint press forms with the design (approved by the Latvian government in February 1940) which replaced the maiden with a portrait of Ulmanis were prepared by the Royal Mint in April 1940, those coins were never minted as the Second World War broke out.

After the Soviet occupation of Latvia in 1940, lats continued to circulate alongside the Soviet ruble, although silver coins had largely disappeared from circulation. (Even prior to the war, Latvian people had started to hoard silver coins to prepare for the imminent crisis.) On 25 March 1941, all denominations of lats were abruptly annulled. As the general society was given no prior warning, an estimated 50 million lats were never exchanged for rubles. The people were left with suddenly-worthless coins and bills, except for sentimental value and the silver content in the coins. The Soviet authorities, however, did have ℒ︁𝓈 5 coins worth around ℒ︁𝓈 3.6 million after the lat was removed from circulation. In 1960, Soviet authorities reportedly sold silver lats coins to foreign numismatists for 28 DEM around the same time the Soviet Bank started purchasing gold and silver coins of historical currencies. The ℒ︁𝓈 5 coin could be sold for 60 kopeks.

== Modern usage ==
The image of the maiden featured on the reverse of the coin was used in the design of the modern Ls 500 banknote. It is also used as a watermark for all lats banknotes.

=== Commemorative ===
The Bank of Latvia has issued two collector coins featuring the imagery of the ℒ︁𝓈 5 coin. The first was struck in 2003 as part of the international series The Smallest Gold Coins of the World. The second was struck in 2012 to commemorate the 90th anniversary of the bank. The Bank of Latvia worked with the British Royal Mint, which minted the original coins, to recreate the coin using electrotypes used in minting the original coins.

=== Latvian Euro coins ===
In 2004, after a nationwide idea contest, the design was selected for the national side of Latvian Euro coins, and approved as a design for both the 1 and 2 Euro coins issued by Latvia. The edge of the 2 Euro coin features an inscription similar to the one on the edge of the 5 lats coin.

== Gallery ==
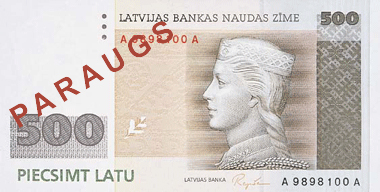
Obverse of the modern Ls 500 banknote

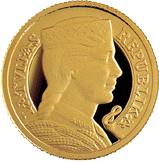
Reverse of the gold commemorative coin

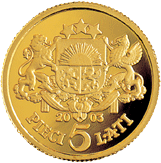
Obverse of the gold commemorative coin

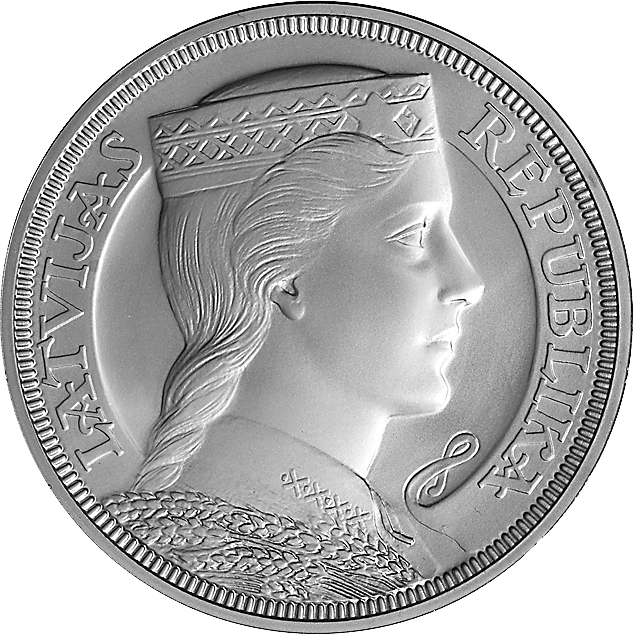
Reverse of the silver commemorative coin

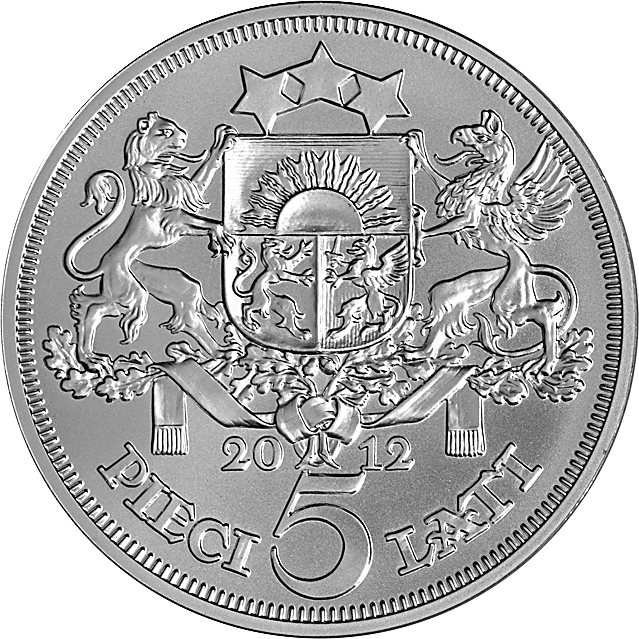
Obverse of the silver commemorative coin

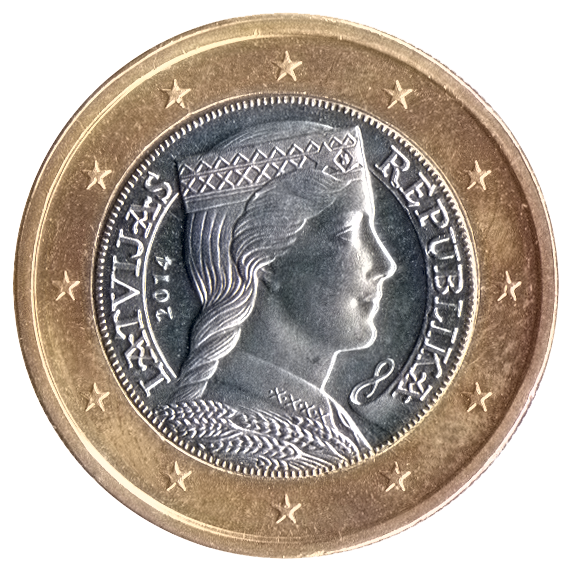
The national side of the 1 Euro coin issued by Latvia

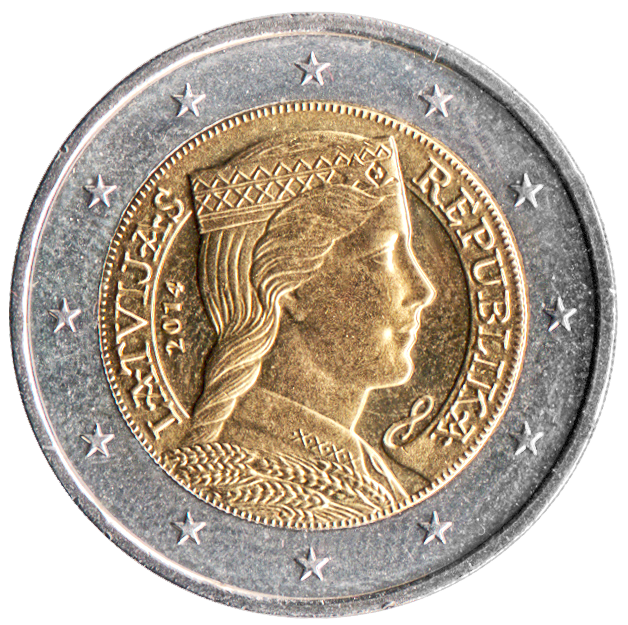
The national side of the 2 Euro coin issued by Latvia
