= Gunārs Lūsis =

Latvian artist and graphical designer (born 1950)

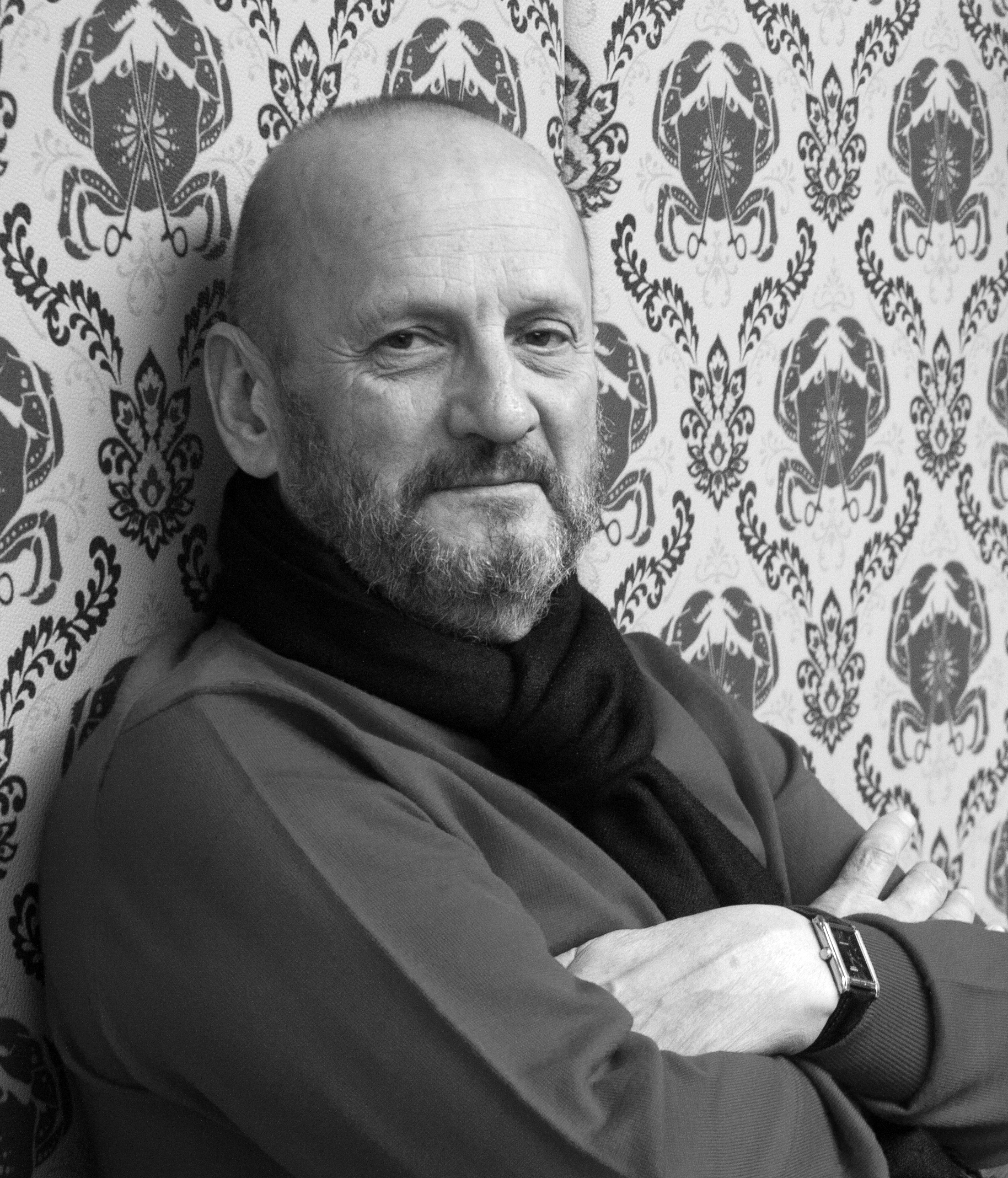
Gunārs Lūsis

Gunārs Lūsis (born 1950) is a Latvian artist and graphical designer. Lūsis is notable for creating the design for some of the modern Latvian coins with denominations in Latvian lats, and for authoring the logo for the Latvian presidency of the Council of the European Union.

== Life ==
Lūsis was born 18 December 1950 in Riga. He graduated 1968 from the Jānis Rozentāls Art High School and 1974 from the Art Academy of Latvia, Faculty of Design. He is member of the Artists' Union of Latvia (Latvian: Latvijas Mākslinieku savienība) since 1978.

During the Soviet era he designed posters and the layout of books. Later he created approximately 70 logos for different institutions and events, like Latvian National Opera Foundation, Song and Dance Festival Riga 800, Cinema Festival Arsenāls, Lido, Riga Stradiņš University etc.

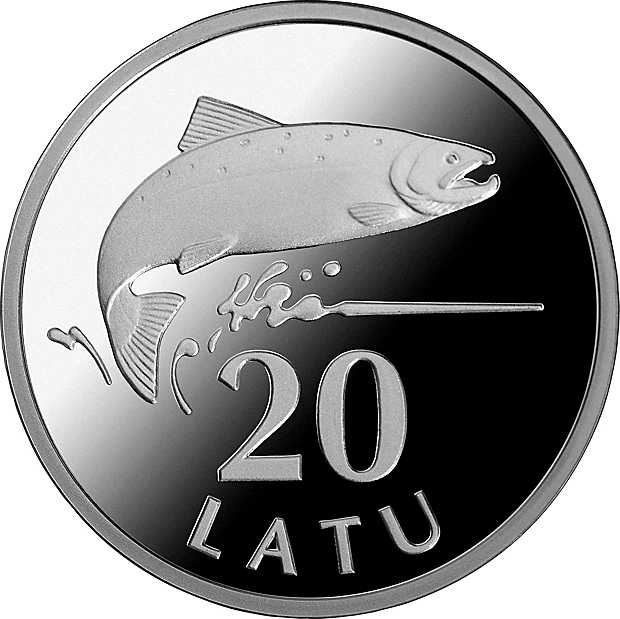
20 Latu silver coin

Lūsis has, in cooperation with Jānis Strupulis, designed a number of Latvian coins with denominations in Lats dated 1992, the bi-metallic 2 Lats coin dated 1999, variations of the 1 Lats coins dated 1999, 2001, and many others.

Lūsis has also been active exhibiting as a painter. He relates himself to artists like Frank Stella, Antoni Tàpies, Robert Rauschenberg and Jasper Johns.
