= Latvian euro coins =

Coin designs used in Latvia

Latvian euro coins feature three separate designs on the national side, which were publicised in July 2006 on the home page of the National Bank of Latvia. The designs featured were the Latvian maiden, which was featured on the 5 lats coin prior to World War II, on the 1 and 2 euro coins, the greater coat of arms of Latvia on the 10, 20 and 50-cent coins, and the lesser Coat of arms of Latvia on the 1, 2 and 5-cent coins. Originally, it was planned that the Freedom Monument would be featured on the 2 euro coin, but the original design did not meet the regulations of the ECB since it reached out into the ring of the coin and changed one of the stars. Latvia decided that a changed design of the monument would not be as recognisable and decided to use the Latvian maiden, used on the 1 euro coin, on the 2 euro coin as well.

== Latvian euro design ==
For the design of images on the common side and a detailed description of the coins, see euro coins.

Depiction of Latvian euro coinage | Obverse side
| €0.01 | €0.02 | €0.05 |
|---|---|---|
Lesser coat of arms of Latvia
| €0.10 | €0.20 | €0.50 |
Greater coat of arms of Latvia
| €1.00 | €2.00 | €2 Coin Edge |
| | | (GOD BLESS LATVIA) |
| Latvian maiden | | (GOD BLESS LATVIA) |

A tender for minting the Latvian euro coins began on 20 September 2012. On 10 December 2012, it was announced that Latvia will utilise the Baden-Württemberg Mint. The coins were minted in Stuttgart except the 1 cent, 10 cent and 1 euro coins, which were minted in Karlsruhe. The production of Latvian euros began in July 2013.

== Circulating mintage quantities ==
| Face Value | €0.01 | €0.02 | €0.05 | €0.10 | €0.20 | €0.50 | €1.00 | €2.00 |
|---|---|---|---|---|---|---|---|---|
| 2014 | 120,000,000 | 80,000,000 | 50,000,000 | 40,000,000 | 35,000,000 | 25,000,000 | 30,000,000 | 20,000,000 |
| 2015 | s | s | s | s | s | s | s | s |
| 2016 | s | s | s | s | s | s | 10,000,000 | s |
| 2017 | —N/a | —N/a | —N/a | —N/a | —N/a | —N/a | —N/a | —N/a |
| 2018 | s | s | s | s | s | s | s | s |
| 2019 | s | s | 15,000,000 | s | s | s | s | s |
| 2020 | s | s | s | s | s | s | s | s |
| 2021 | s | s | s | s | s | s | s | s |
| 2022 | s | s | s | s | s | s | s | s |
| 2023 | —N/a | —N/a | 15,000,000 | —N/a | —N/a | —N/a | —N/a | —N/a |
— No coins were minted that year for that denomination s Small quantities minted for sets only

=== Mints ===
2014: Germany (Stuttgart): 2 cent, 5 cent, 20 cent, 50 cent, 2 euro.
2014: Germany (Karlsruhe): 1 cent, 10 cent, 1 euro.
2015-2018: Germany (Stuttgart)

== €2 commemorative coins ==
| Year | Subject | Volume |

=== Latvian Historical Regions series ===
| Year | Number | Design | Volume |
|---|---|---|---|
| 2016 | 1 | Vidzeme's coat of arms | |
| 2017 | 2 | Courland's coat of arms | |
| 2017 | 3 | Latgale's coat of arms | |
| 2018 | 4 | Semigallia's coat of arms | |
| 2025 | 5 | Selonia's coat of arms | |

== See also ==
- Euro gold and silver commemorative coins
- Adoption of the euro in Latvia
