= Milda (given name) =

- Gender: Female
- Name day: May 13

Origin
- Region of origin: Lithuania, Latvia

Milda is a Lithuanian and Latvian feminine given name. The associated name day is May 11.

People named Milda include:

- Milda Dorethea Prytz (1891–1977), Norwegian chemist
- Milda Sauliūtė (born 1981), Lithuanian professional basketball player
- Milda Valčiukaitė (born 1994), Lithuanian rower
