= Finesti =

- Company type: Société Anonyme
- Founded: 1995
- Defunct: 2013
- Fate: Integrated into Fundsquare
- Successor: Fundsquare
- Headquarters: Luxembourg
- Key people: Michel Maquil (Chairman), Dominique Valschaerts (CEO)
- Parent: Luxembourg Stock Exchange
- Website: www.fundsquare.net

Finesti was a Luxembourg-based company that carried out collection, management and dissemination of data and documents related to investment funds. It also provided general consultation products and services in order to facilitate public access to investment fund information.

On 1 July 2013, all its activities were taken over by Fundsquare, a wholly owned subsidiary of the Luxembourg Stock Exchange.

The majority of the information on investment funds that was collected and disseminated by Finesti was derived from Luxembourg-domiciled funds, although it was also active in collecting data and documents from funds in other European countries. As at December 2008, its database contained data and documents on around 31,000 share classes of investment funds.

Data and documents were collected from fund administrators and promoters. They were then repackaged into dissemination products for financial data vendors and other users of bulk data. Information collected was also made available on its website.

== History ==
The company was created in April 1995, as CCLux (Centrale de Communications Luxembourg S.A.), by the Association of the Luxembourg Fund Industry (ALFI), the Luxembourg Stock Exchange and around thirty Luxembourg financial institutions. It became a wholly owned subsidiary of the Luxembourg Stock Exchange in May 2002.

On 28 January 2009, it changed its name to Finesti. It shared infrastructure and resources with the Luxembourg Stock Exchange and, in particular, it shared a secure transmission platform, known as e-file.lu.

Following its integration into Fundsquare in July 2013, the company was wound up.

== Collection Platforms ==
The e-file.lu platform was used for transmission of fund regulatory reports and other fund documents, such as prospectuses and annual and semi-annual reports, to the Luxembourg financial regulator, the Commission de Surveillance du Secteur Financier (CSSF), and the Central Bank of Luxembourg. Finesti was mandated by these authorities to provide these services.

In addition to this platform, it also ran an in-house collection platform, known as the Finesti Station, for the collection of other types of data from investment fund administrators.

== Partnerships ==
Finesti and a Danish company called FundConnect were mandated by the European Fund and Asset Management Association (EFAMA) to be joint Classification Administrators of its European Fund Classification (EFC) with the mission to implement the EFC on a pan-European basis.

The company was also active in the provision of Fund Processing Passports, short harmonized documents containing all key operational information to facilitate investment fund processing within Europe.

Finesti also provided data services for the Luxembourg Fund Labelling Agency (LuxFLAG), an organisation providing information on microfinance investment vehicles.
