= Michel Maquil =

Michel Maquil was born on 15 May 1950 in Esch-sur-Alzette in Luxembourg and was the President and Chief Executive Officer of the Luxembourg Stock Exchange (Bourse de Luxembourg) from 2001 to 18 April 2012.

== Career ==
He joined the Luxembourg Stock Exchange in 1974 and held a number of positions prior to being appointed Chief Executive in 1987 and President & Chief Executive Officer in April 2001. He was replaced by Robert Scharfe on 18 April 2012.

Michel Maquil was also chairman of the board of Finesti, a wholly owned subsidiary of the Luxembourg Stock Exchange, until 17 April 2012.

Michel Maquil sits on the board of the Luxembourg Banks and Bankers Association (ABBL) and the Association of the Luxembourg Fund Industry (ALFI). He belongs to various bodies of the Brussels-based Federation of European Securities Exchanges (FESE). He is also a delegate of the Luxembourg Stock Exchange to the General Assemblies of the Paris-based World Federation of Stock Exchanges. He belongs to a number of committees and working groups, set up by the Luxembourg financial regulator, the Commission for the Supervision of the Financial centre (CSSF), dealing with the organization and development of the Luxembourg financial centre. He is set to retire by the end of 2012 and pursue a career as an independent consultant.

== Personal ==
Michel Maquil graduated in economics from the Catholic University of Louvain, Belgium. He sits on the Board of the Luxembourg Association of the Friends of the Catholic University of Louvain Foundation. He is married and has three children.

== Footnotes ==
Business positions
Preceded by Marcel Lamboray	President and CEO Luxembourg Stock Exchange; 1987–2012	Succeeded by Robert Scharfe
