= Denmark and the euro =

Eurozone participation European Union member states (special territories not shown) 21 in the eurozone 1 in ERM II, with an opt-out (Denmark) 5 not in ERM II, but committed to join the eurozone after meeting the convergence criteria (Czech Republic, Hungary, Poland, Romania, and Sweden) Non–EU member states 4 using the euro with a monetary agreement (Andorra, Monaco, San Marino, and Vatican City) 2 using the euro unilaterally (Kosovo and Montenegro)

Denmark uses the Danish krone as its official currency. While it is a member state of the European Union, it has not joined the eurozone or adopted the euro. The country negotiated the right to opt out from participation under the Maastricht Treaty of 1992. In 2000, the government held a referendum on introducing the euro, which was defeated with 53.2% voting no and 46.8% voting yes. The Danish krone is part of the ERM II mechanism, so its exchange rate is tied to within a 2.25% range of the euro.

Several Danish political parties favour adopting the euro, and a second referendum has been proposed several times since 2000. However, some important parties such as the Danish People's Party, Socialist People's Party, and Red–Green Alliance do not support joining the currency. Public opinion surveys have shown fluctuating support for the single currency, with the majority in favour for a few years before the 2008 financial crisis, with support falling further due to the euro area crisis in 2011.

International finance scholars generally consider currency pegs to be fragile; however, Denmark has been able to maintain the krone's peg to the euro consistently since its introduction in 1999.

== Current status ==
=== Opt-outs ===
The Danish government held a referendum in 1992 to approve ratification of the Maastricht Treaty, as required by the Danish constitution for any transfers of sovereignty which are not approved by 5/6 of parliament (Folketing). The coalition government of Denmark in 1992 consisted of the Conservatives and Agrarian Liberals, which together with the Social Democrats in opposition held approximately 80% of the seats in parliament leading them to believe that the referendum would be easily approved. However, the referendum resulted in 50.7% of the population voting against the ratification of the Maastricht Treaty, while only 49.3% voted in favour.

Ratification of the Maastricht Treaty required unanimous approval by all the member states in the European Union. The Danish "no", therefore, posed a significant issue for further integration. Denmark was not the only country issuing a referendum for the ratification of the Maastricht Treaty. In France, the public supported the treaty by only a small margin, while the Irish also voted in favour of the Treaty. The Danish "no" and the French "petit oui" are known in scholarly circles as the erosion of the permissive consensus regarding public support for European integration.

The solution to the lack of public support for further European integration in Denmark is known as "the National Compromise". 7 out of 8 parties in the Danish parliament came together in support a proposal to request 4 opt-outs: Union citizenship, Common Security and Defence, Justice and Home Affairs and participation in the last phase of the European Monetary Union. At the European Council summit on 11–12 December 1992 in Edinburgh, the European leaders agreed to these four opt-outs. This led to the Maastricht Treaty being accepted in a second referendum on 18 May 1993.

=== Exchange Rate Mechanism II ===
While Denmark chose not join the eurozone due to its opt-out, it participates in the Exchange Rate Mechanism II (ERM II), a fixed exchange rate regime in which the Danish currency and other participating countries' currency are pegged to the euro.

The krone has been part of the ERM II mechanism since 1 January 1999, when it replaced the original ERM. This policy marks continuation of a similar peg from 1982 to 1999 with the Deutsche Mark. Following Bulgaria's adoption of the euro on 1 January 2026, Denmark is the only European Union member state participating in the ERM II.

Denmark is required to ensure that the kroner trades within 2.25% either side of a specified rate of 1 euro equal to 7.46038 kroner (making the lower rate 7.29252 and the upper rate 7.62824). However, in practice the exchange rate has kept within 0.5% of the defined rate, even less than the set limits. If the Krone goes beyond the limits, the Danmarks Nationalbank is mandated to intervene and bring it back within the fluctuation band, with the European Central Bank obliged to intervene if the Danish central bank is unable to do so. Two approaches are used to adjust the money supply and exchange rate. The first tool is intervention through the purchase and selling currencies to adjust the available money level. The second tool is an adjustment of the interest rates.

The European Central Bank conducts monetary policy independently of the national governments in the eurozone, resulting in loss of independence in monitary policy in favour of price stability. The ECB is committed to maintaining 2% inflation in the middle to long run. The decrease in fluctuations of currency reduces uncertainty for traders.

Denmark has had a fixed exchange rate since the end of the Second World War and has participated in several monetary cooperation systems. Therefore, participating in ERM II was not a change in this sense, and the lost autonomy in monetary policy and associated inability to respond to domestic economic shocks with monetary policy tools, had existed since the creation of the Bretton Woods system.

=== Convergence status ===
Convergence criteria
Assessment date	Country	HICP inflation rate (Note: The rate of change of the 12-month average HICP over the prior 12-month average must be no more than 1.5% larger than the unweighted arithmetic average of the similar HICP inflation rates in the 3 EU member states with the lowest HICP inflation. If any of these 3 states have a HICP rate significantly below the similarly averaged HICP rate for the eurozone (which according to ECB practice means more than 2% below), and if this low HICP rate has been primarily caused by exceptional circumstances (i.e. severe wage cuts or a strong recession), then such a state is not included in the calculation of the reference value and is replaced by the EU state with the fourth lowest HICP rate.)	Excessive deficit procedure		Exchange rate		Long-term interest rate (Note: The arithmetic average of the annual yield of 10-year government bonds as of the end of the past 12 months must be no more than 2.0% larger than the unweighted arithmetic average of the bond yields in the 3 EU member states with the lowest HICP inflation. If any of these states have bond yields which are significantly larger than the similarly averaged yield for the eurozone (which according to previous ECB reports means more than 2% above) and at the same time does not have complete funding access to financial markets (which is the case for as long as a government receives bailout funds), then such a state is not to be included in the calculation of the reference value.)	Compatibility of legislation
Assessment date	Country	HICP inflation rate	Budget deficit to GDP	Debt-to-GDP ratio	ERM II member	Change in rate (Note: The change in the annual average exchange rate against the euro.)	Long-term interest rate	Compatibility of legislation
2012 ECB Report (Note: Reference values from the ECB convergence report of May 2012.)	Reference values	Max. 3.1% (Note: Sweden, Ireland and Slovenia were the reference states.) (as of 31 Mar 2012)	None open (as of 31 Mar 2012)		Min. 2 years (as of 31 Mar 2012)	Max. ±15% (Note: The maximum allowed change in rate is ± 2.25% for Denmark.) (for 2011)	Max. 5.80% (Note: Sweden and Slovenia were the reference states, with Ireland excluded as an outlier.) (as of 31 Mar 2012)	Compliant (as of 31 Mar 2012)
2012 ECB Report	Reference values	Max. 3.1% (as of 31 Mar 2012)	Max. 3.0% (FY 2011)	Max. 60% (FY 2011)	Min. 2 years (as of 31 Mar 2012)	Max. ±15% (for 2011)	Max. 5.80% (as of 31 Mar 2012)	Compliant (as of 31 Mar 2012)
2012 ECB Report	Denmark	2.7%	Open		13 years, 3 months	-0.4%	2.39%	Not assessed
2012 ECB Report	Denmark	2.7%	1.8%	46.5%	13 years, 3 months	-0.4%	2.39%	Not assessed
2013 ECB Report (Note: Reference values from the ECB convergence report of June 2013.)	Reference values	Max. 2.7% (Note: Sweden, Latvia and Ireland were the reference states.) (as of 30 Apr 2013)	None open (as of 30 Apr 2013)		Min. 2 years (as of 30 Apr 2013)	Max. ±15% (for 2012)	Max. 5.5% (as of 30 Apr 2013)	Compliant (as of 30 Apr 2013)
2013 ECB Report	Reference values	Max. 2.7% (as of 30 Apr 2013)	Max. 3.0% (FY 2012)	Max. 60% (FY 2012)	Min. 2 years (as of 30 Apr 2013)	Max. ±15% (for 2012)	Max. 5.5% (as of 30 Apr 2013)	Compliant (as of 30 Apr 2013)
2013 ECB Report	Denmark	1.8%	Open		14 years, 4 months	0.1%	1.33%	Not assessed
2013 ECB Report	Denmark	1.8%	4.0%	45.8%	14 years, 4 months	0.1%	1.33%	Not assessed
2014 ECB Report (Note: Reference values from the ECB convergence report of June 2014.)	Reference values	Max. 1.7% (Note: Latvia, Portugal and Ireland were the reference states, with Greece, Bulgaria and Cyprus excluded as outliers.) (as of 30 Apr 2014)	None open (as of 30 Apr 2014)		Min. 2 years (as of 30 Apr 2014)	Max. ±15% (for 2013)	Max. 6.2% (Note: Latvia, Ireland and Portugal were the reference states.) (as of 30 Apr 2014)	Compliant (as of 30 Apr 2014)
2014 ECB Report	Reference values	Max. 1.7% (as of 30 Apr 2014)	Max. 3.0% (FY 2013)	Max. 60% (FY 2013)	Min. 2 years (as of 30 Apr 2014)	Max. ±15% (for 2013)	Max. 6.2% (as of 30 Apr 2014)	Compliant (as of 30 Apr 2014)
2014 ECB Report	Denmark	0.4%	Open (Closed in June 2014)		15 years, 4 months	-0.2%	1.78%	Not assessed
2014 ECB Report	Denmark	0.4%	0.8%	44.5%	15 years, 4 months	-0.2%	1.78%	Not assessed
2016 ECB Report (Note: Reference values from the ECB convergence report of June 2016.)	Reference values	Max. 0.7% (Note: Bulgaria, Slovenia and Spain were the reference states, with Cyprus and Romania excluded as outliers.) (as of 30 Apr 2016)	None open (as of 18 May 2016)		Min. 2 years (as of 18 May 2016)	Max. ±15% (for 2015)	Max. 4.0% (Note: Slovenia, Spain and Bulgaria were the reference states.) (as of 30 Apr 2016)	Compliant (as of 18 May 2016)
2016 ECB Report	Reference values	Max. 0.7% (as of 30 Apr 2016)	Max. 3.0% (FY 2015)	Max. 60% (FY 2015)	Min. 2 years (as of 18 May 2016)	Max. ±15% (for 2015)	Max. 4.0% (as of 30 Apr 2016)	Compliant (as of 18 May 2016)
2016 ECB Report	Denmark	0.2%	None		17 years, 4 months	-0.1%	0.8%	Not assessed
2016 ECB Report	Denmark	0.2%	2.1%	40.2%	17 years, 4 months	-0.1%	0.8%	Not assessed
2018 ECB Report (Note: Reference values from the ECB convergence report of May 2018.)	Reference values	Max. 1.9% (Note: Cyprus, Ireland and Finland were the reference states.) (as of 31 Mar 2018)	None open (as of 3 May 2018)		Min. 2 years (as of 3 May 2018)	Max. ±15% (for 2017)	Max. 3.2% (Note: Cyprus, Ireland and Finland were the reference states.) (as of 31 Mar 2018)	Compliant (as of 20 March 2018)
2018 ECB Report	Reference values	Max. 1.9% (as of 31 Mar 2018)	Max. 3.0% (FY 2017)	Max. 60% (FY 2017)	Min. 2 years (as of 3 May 2018)	Max. ±15% (for 2017)	Max. 3.2% (as of 31 Mar 2018)	Compliant (as of 20 March 2018)
2018 ECB Report	Denmark	1.0%	None		19 years, 4 months	0.1%	0.6%	Not assessed
2018 ECB Report	Denmark	1.0%	-1.0% (surplus)	36.4%	19 years, 4 months	0.1%	0.6%	Not assessed
2020 ECB Report (Note: Reference values from the ECB convergence report of June 2020.)	Reference values	Max. 1.8% (Note: Portugal, Cyprus, and Italy were the reference states.) (as of 31 Mar 2020)	None open (as of 7 May 2020)		Min. 2 years (as of 7 May 2020)	Max. ±15% (for 2019)	Max. 2.9% (Note: Portugal, Cyprus, and Italy were the reference states.) (as of 31 Mar 2020)	Compliant (as of 24 March 2020)
2020 ECB Report	Reference values	Max. 1.8% (as of 31 Mar 2020)	Max. 3.0% (FY 2019)	Max. 60% (FY 2019)	Min. 2 years (as of 7 May 2020)	Max. ±15% (for 2019)	Max. 2.9% (as of 31 Mar 2020)	Compliant (as of 24 March 2020)
2020 ECB Report	Denmark	0.6%	None		21 years, 4 months	-0.2%	-0.3%	Not assessed
2020 ECB Report	Denmark	0.6%	-3.7% (surplus)	33.2%	21 years, 4 months	-0.2%	-0.3%	Not assessed
2022 ECB Report (Note: Reference values from the Convergence Report of June 2022.)	Reference values	Max. 4.9% (Note: France, Finland, and Greece were the reference states.) (as of April 2022)	None open (as of 25 May 2022)		Min. 2 years (as of 25 May 2022)	Max. ±15% (for 2021)	Max. 2.6% (as of April 2022)	Compliant (as of 25 March 2022)
2022 ECB Report	Reference values	Max. 4.9% (as of April 2022)	Max. 3.0% (FY 2021)	Max. 60% (FY 2021)	Min. 2 years (as of 25 May 2022)	Max. ±15% (for 2021)	Max. 2.6% (as of April 2022)	Compliant (as of 25 March 2022)
2022 ECB Report	Denmark	3.6%	None		23 years, 4 months	0.2%	0.2%	Not assessed
2022 ECB Report	Denmark	3.6%	-2.3% (surplus)	36.7%	23 years, 4 months	0.2%	0.2%	Not assessed
2024 ECB Report (Note: Reference values from the Convergence Report of June 2024.)	Reference values	Max. 3.3% (Note: Belgium, Denmark, and the Netherlands were the reference states.) (as of May 2024)	None open (as of 19 June 2024)		Min. 2 years (as of 19 June 2024)	Max. ±15% (for 2023)	Max. 4.8% (as of May 2024)	Compliant (as of 27 March 2024)
2024 ECB Report	Reference values	Max. 3.3% (as of May 2024)	Max. 3.0% (FY 2023)	Max. 60% (FY 2023)	Min. 2 years (as of 19 June 2024)	Max. ±15% (for 2023)	Max. 4.8% (as of May 2024)	Compliant (as of 27 March 2024)
2024 ECB Report	Denmark	1.1%	None		25 years, 5 months	−0.2%	2.6%	Not assessed
2024 ECB Report	Denmark	1.1%	−3.1% (surplus)	29.3%	25 years, 5 months	−0.2%	2.6%	Not assessed
2025 ECB Report (Note: Reference values from the Convergence Report of June 2025.)	Reference values	Max. 2.8% (Note: Finland, Ireland, and Italy were the reference states.) (as of April 2025)	None open (as of 19 May 2025)		Min. 2 years (as of 19 May 2025)	Max. ±15% (for 2024)	Max. 5.1% (as of April 2025)	Compliant (as of 15 April 2025)
2025 ECB Report	Reference values	Max. 2.8% (as of April 2025)	Max. 3.0% (FY 2024)	Max. 60% (FY 2024)	Min. 2 years (as of 19 May 2025)	Max. ±15% (for 2024)	Max. 5.1% (as of April 2025)	Compliant (as of 15 April 2025)
2025 ECB Report	Denmark	1.6%	None		26 years, 4 months	−0.1%	2.3%	Not assessed
2025 ECB Report	Denmark	1.6%	−4.5% (surplus)	31.1%	26 years, 4 months	−0.1%	2.3%	Not assessed
2026 ECB Report (Note: Reference values from the Convergence Report of June 2026.)	Reference values	Max. 2.7% (Note: Cyprus, Denmark, and France were the reference states.) (as of May 2026)	None open (as of 17 June 2026)		Min. 2 years (as of 17 June 2026)	Max. ±15% (for 2025)	Max. 5.1% (as of May 2026)	Compliant (as of 25 March 2026)
2026 ECB Report	Reference values	Max. 2.7% (as of May 2026)	Max. 3.0% (FY 2025)	Max. 60% (FY 2025)	Min. 2 years (as of 17 June 2026)	Max. ±15% (for 2025)	Max. 5.1% (as of May 2026)	Compliant (as of 25 March 2026)
2026 ECB Report	Denmark	1.6%	None		27 years, 5 months	−0.6%	2.6%	Not assessed
2026 ECB Report	Denmark	1.6%	−2.9% (surplus)	27.9%	27 years, 5 months	−0.6%	2.6%	Not assessed

Criterion fulfilled
Criterion potentially fulfilled: If the budget deficit exceeds the 3% limit, but is "close" to this value (the European Commission has deemed 3.5% to be close by in the past), then the criteria can still potentially be fulfilled if either the deficits in the previous two years are significantly declining towards the 3% limit, or if the excessive deficit is the result of exceptional circumstances which are temporary in nature (i.e. one-off expenditures triggered by a significant economic downturn, or by the implementation of economic reforms that are expected to deliver a significant positive impact on the government's future fiscal budgets). However, even if such "special circumstances" are found to exist, additional criteria must also be met to comply with the fiscal budget criterion. Additionally, if the debt-to-GDP ratio exceeds 60% but is "sufficiently diminishing and approaching the reference value at a satisfactory pace" it can be deemed to be in compliance.
Criterion not fulfilled

== History ==
=== Early monetary unions in Denmark (1873–1914) ===
On 5 May 1873 Denmark with Sweden fixed their currencies against gold and formed the Scandinavian Monetary Union, with Norway joining in 1875. Prior to this date, Denmark used the Danish rigsdaler divided into 96 rigsbank skilling. The union had the currency pegged to gold at the rate of 2.48 kroner per gram of gold, or 0.4032 grams per krone. An equal valued krone of the monetary union replaced the three legacy currencies at the rate of 1 krone = ½ Danish rigsdaler = ¼ Norwegian speciedaler = 1 Swedish riksdaler. The new currency became a legal tender and was accepted in all three countries. This monetary union lasted until 1914 when World War I brought an end to it.

=== European Monetary System and pre-euro monetary co-operation ===
The collapse of the Bretton Woods system destabilised European markets, and monetary integration among the member states of the European Economic Community (now European Union). Under the Bretton Woods system, the dollar was pegged to the gold standard. Following the collapse of the Bretton Woods system, the European Currency Snake system came into force on 24 April 1972 with Denmark joining on 1 May 1972. Shortly after, the Danish Crown came under speculative attacks, and was forced to abandon the system, but the joined again a few months later.

The European Monetary System was established in 1979 to maintain stability in EEC countries with Denmark being one of the 8 participating countries. The EMS created an Exchange Rate Mechanism with fixed bands for currencies of participating countries. The Danish economy experienced recession in 1980, forcing the government to introduce several economic reforms. The most significant reform was the decision to opt for a fixed exchange rate policy in 1982 and stopping currency devaluation by pegging it against the German D-mark.

As the Danish people did not vote in favour of the 1992 Treaty, it did not adopt the euro, However, in 1998 Denmark agreed to participate in Exchange Rate Mechanism II with a narrow fluctuation band of ± 2.25% (instead of the ± 15%, which is the standard fluctuation band in the mechanism). The agreement was negotiated and finalised in the ECOFIN Council 25–27 September 1998. The difference between ERM and ERM II is that the currencies participating in ERM II are no longer linked to bilateral parities with other participating currencies as they were in the original ERM system, but rather they are pegged to the euro instead.

=== Euro referendum (2000) ===
A referendum was held on 28 September 2000, proposing that Denmark join the eurozone on 1 January 2002. While most political parties, media organisations and economic actors in Denmark campaigned in favour of adopting the euro, the referendum was rejected. Turnout was 87.6%, with 46.8% voting in favour of adopting the euro and 53.2% voting against. Some analysts believe that the significant weakening of the euro against the US dollar preceding the referendum directly contributed to its rejection.

=== Possible second euro referendum ===
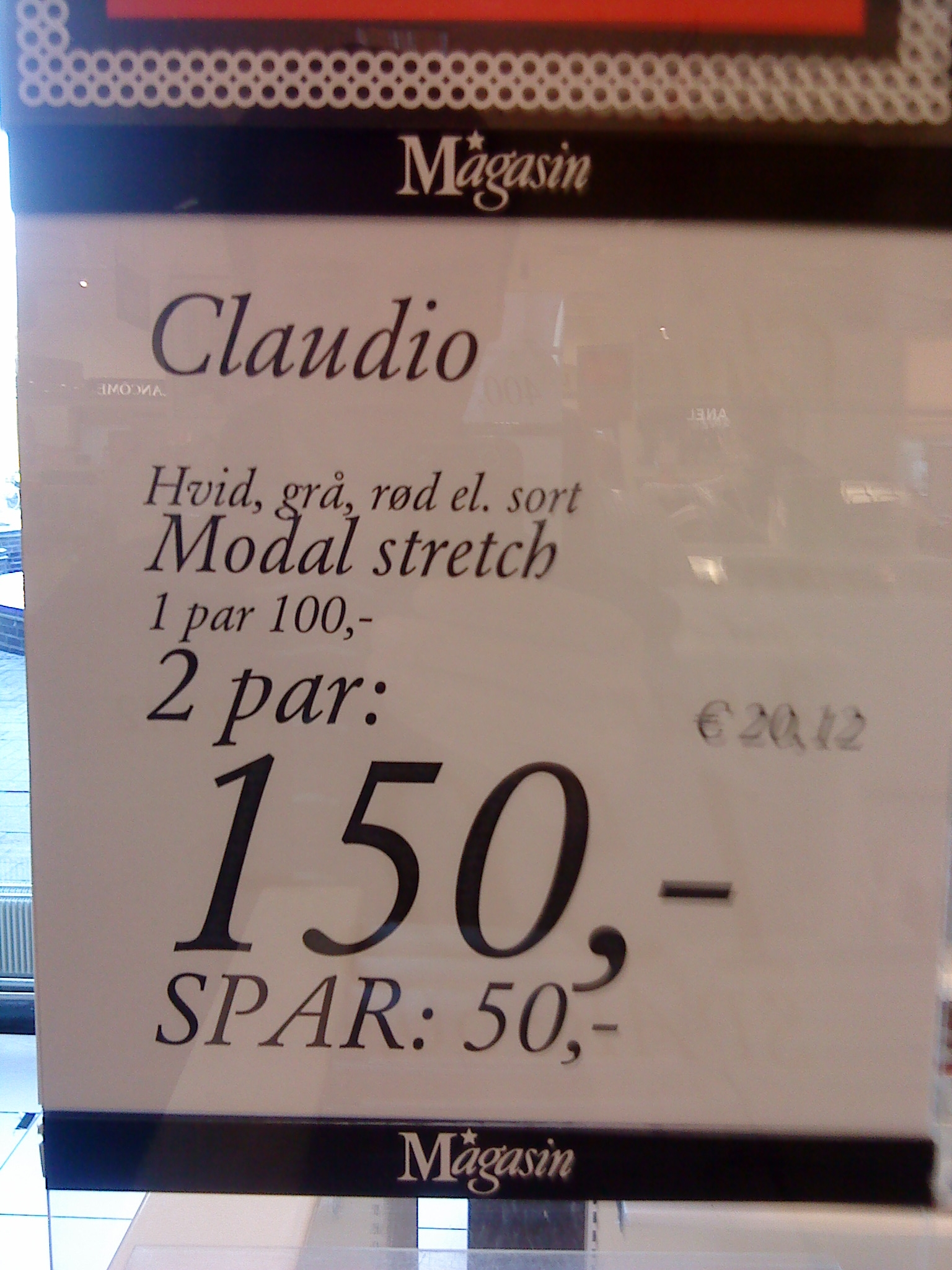
Double krone and euro prices in Magasin (2009)

On 22 November 2007, the newly re-elected Danish government declared its intention to hold a new referendum on the abolition of the four opt-outs, including the opt-out from the euro, by 2011. It was unclear if people would vote on each exemption separately, or if people would vote on all of them together. However, the uncertainty, both in terms of the stability of the euro and the establishment of new political structures at the EU level, resulting first from the 2008 financial crisis and then subsequently from the related euro area crisis, led the government to postpone the referendum to after the end of its legislative term. When a new government came to power in September 2011, it decided to not hold a referendum.

As part of the European elections in 2014, it was argued collectively by the group of pro-European Danish parties (Venstre, Konservative, Social Democrats and Radikale Venstre), that a euro referendum would not be held until the "development dust had settled" from the establishment of multiple initiatives in response to the euro area crisis. When a new Venstre-led government came to power in June 2015, its manifesto did not include any plan for holding a referendum on euro adoption. During the referendum to abolish the defence opt-out in 2022, the prime minister of Denmark, Mette Frederiksen, promised not to hold an additional euro referendum during her tenure as prime minister. No plans for holding a euro referendum were included in the government manifest of 2022.

There has been some speculation that the result of a Danish referendum would affect the Swedish debate on the euro.

=== Usage today ===
The euro can be used at some locations in Denmark, usually in places catering to tourists, such as museums, airports and shops with large numbers of international visitors. However, change is usually given in kroner. Double krone-euro prices are used on all ferries going between Denmark and Germany.

On 10 January 2020, the 500 euro note was phased out in Denmark as part of the fight against money laundering and terrorism financing. At the time, the banknote was worth 3,737 Danish kroner (DKK), more than three times the highest denomination of the domestic currency, the thousand-kroner banknote. The European Central Bank had stopped issuing the banknote in 2019, but was critical of the law. In an opinion published in February 2019, it was argued that it conflicted with the principle of "sincere cooperation" set out in Article IV of the Treaty on European Union, and noted that no ban was planned for other high-value units of currency, such as the highest Swiss franc banknote, worth more than 6,500 DKK at the time.

== Impact of potential euro adoption ==
If Denmark were to adopt the euro, the monetary policy would be transferred from the Danmarks Nationalbank to the ESCB, limiting its ability to have an independent monetary policy. However, a study of the history of the Danish monetary policy shows that, "while Denmark does not share a single currency, its central bank has always tracked changes made by the ESCB".

While outside the euro, Denmark does not have any representation in the ESCB direction. Non-participation in the eurozone has been criticised by the former Prime Minister Anders Fogh Rasmussen, who stated that: "De facto, Denmark participates in the euro zone but without having a seat at the table where decisions are made, and that's a political problem". The ESCB has no obligation to defend the Danish krone exchange rate, which is the responsibility of the Danmarks Nationalbank and Danish government. In a crisis, a small country's national bank can defend the exchange rate only to a limited extent.

The expected practical advantages of euro include lower transaction costs, transparency of foreign markets for Danish consumers, and possibly a lowering of interest rates.

During the euro area crisis, European leaders established the European Financial Stability Facility, a special purpose vehicle to maintain financial stability in the eurozone by providing financial assistance to member states in difficulty. It has two parts, the first establishing a €60 billion stabilisation fund (European Financial Stabilisation Mechanism) with contributions from European countries on a pro-rata basis, regardless of their membership in the eurozone. The second part consisted €440 billion worth government-backed loans to improve market confidence. All eurozone economies will participate in funding this mechanism, while other EU members can choose whether to participate. Unlike Sweden and Poland, Denmark has refused to help fund this portion of the EFSF.

== Public opinion ==
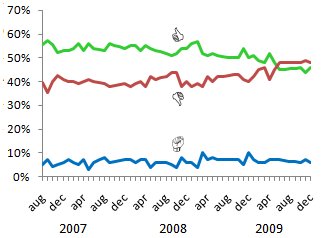
Euro opinion in Denmark since August 2006 by Børsen. green – support of adopting the euro red – against adopting the euro blue – undecided

DKK-EUR exchange rate since 1999

There have been numerous opinion polls on whether Denmark should abolish the krone and join the eurozone, with varied wordings of the questions. Polls generally favoured euro adoption from 2002 to 2010; however, they showed a rapid decline in support during the euro area crisis, reaching a low in May 2012 with 26% in favour versus 67% against, and 7% being doubtful. In March 2018, 29% of respondents from Denmark in a Eurobarometer opinion poll stated that they were in favour of the EMU and the euro, while 65% were against. The same poll conducted in May 2024 signaled a gradual rise in support for the euro from the previous level recorded in 2012 and 2018; with 34% now in favour, 58% against, and 8% undecided.

Polls from 2002 to 2016:

Date	YES	NO	Unsure	Number of participants	Held by	Ref
29 March – 30 April 2002	47%	33%	21%	unknown	Eurobarometer	
March 2007	56%	39%	5%	910 Persons	Greens Analyseinstitut published in Børsen	
April 2007	53%	40%	7%	910 Persons	Greens Analyseinstitut published in Børsen	
November 2007	54%	42%	4%	unknown	Greens Analyseinstitut published in Børsen	
26 November 2007	52%	39%	9%	1,016 Danish adults	Vilstrup Synovate published in Politiken	
April 2008	55%	38%	7%	1,009 Danish adults	Greens Analyseinstitut published in Børsen	
5–7 May 2008	54%	42%	4%	1,009 Danish adults	Greens Analyseinstitut published in Børsen	
Mid-June 2008	40%	48%	12%	1,036 Danes	Capacent Epinions	
29 September – 1 October 2008	52%	44%	4%	1,050 Danish adults	Greens Analyseinstitut published in Børsen	
3–5 November 2008	54%	38%	8%	1,098 Danish adults	Greens Analyseinstitut published in Børsen	
December 2008	54%	40%	6%	>1,000 Danish adults	Greens Analyseinstitut published in Børsen	
5–7 January 2009	56%	38%	4%	1,307 Danish adults	Greens Analyseinstitut published in Børsen	
2–4 February 2009	57%	39%	4%	1,124 Danish adults	Greens Analyseinstitut published in Børsen	
11 February 2009	42%	42%	16%	unknown	Gallup Poll in Berlingske Tidende	
2–4 March 2009	52%	38%	10%	1,085 Danish adults	Greens Analyseinstitut published in Børsen	
30 March – 1 April 2009	51%	42%	7%	1,007 Danish adults	Greens Analyseinstitut published in Børsen	
27–29 April 2009	52%	40%	8%	1,178 Danish adults	Greens Analyseinstitut published in Børsen	
13 May 2009	43%	45%	11%	unknown	Rambøll	
25–27 May 2009	51%	42%	7%	951 Danish adults	Greens Analyseinstitut published in Børsen	
September 2009	50%	43%	7%	951 Danish adults	Greens Analyseinstitut published in Børsen	
October 2009	50%	43%	7%	1,081 Danish adults	Greens Analyseinstitut published in Børsen	
2–4 November 2009	54%	41%	5%	1,158 Danish adults	Greens Analyseinstitut published in Børsen	
30 November – 2 December 2009	50%	40%	10%	1,001 Danish adults	Greens Analyseinstitut published in Børsen	
2–4 January 2010	51%	42%	7%	1,162 Danish adults	Greens Analyseinstitut published in Børsen	
1–3 February 2010	49%	45%	6%	1,241 Danish adults	Greens Analyseinstitut published in Børsen	
1–3 March 2010	48%	46%	6%	552 Danish adults	Greens Analyseinstitut published in Børsen	
12–14 April 2010	52%	41%	7%	988 Danish adults	Greens Analyseinstitut published in Børsen	
3–5 May 2010	48%	45%	7%	1,004 Danish adults	Greens Analyseinstitut published in Børsen	
11–13 May 2010	45%	43.2%	11.2%	1,002 Danish adults	Catinét Ritzau published in Fyens	
31 May – 2 June 2010	45%	48%	7%	1,079 Danish adults	Greens Analyseinstitut published in Børsen	
27 September 2010	45%	48.3%	6.7%	unknown	Jyllands-Posten	
1 October 2010	46%	48%	6%	1,025 Danish adults	Greens Analyseinstitut published in Børsen	
1 November 2010	44%	49%	7%	unknown	Greens Analyseinstitut published in Børsen	
1 December 2010	46%	48%	6%	1,006 Danish adults	Greens Analyseinstitut published in Børsen	
1 January 2011	43%	50%	7%	1,336 Danish adults	Greens Analyseinstitut published in Børsen	
1 February 2011	43%	48%	9%	1,053 Danish adults	Greens Analyseinstitut published in Børsen	
1 March 2011	47%	46%	7%	1,060 Danish adults	Greens Analyseinstitut published in Børsen	
1 April 2011	43%	50%	7%	1,286 Danish adults	Greens Analyseinstitut published in Børsen	
1 May 2011	44%	48%	8%	1,133 Danish adults	Greens Analyseinstitut published in Børsen	
1 August 2011	37%	54%	9%	1,143 Danish adults	Greens Analyseinstitut published in Børsen	
September 2011?	22.5%	50.6%	28.1%	unknown	Danske Bank	
11 October 2011	29%	65%	6%	1,239 Danes	Greens Analyseinstitut published in Børsen	
4–6 May 2012	26%	67%	7%	1,092 Danish adults	Greens Analyseinstitut published in Børsen	
24–27 February 2013	29%	64%	7%	1,004 Danish adults	Greens Analyseinstitut published in Børsen	
3–9 January 2014	30%	62%	8%	1,199 Danish adults	Greens Analyseinstitut published in Børsen	
25 April – 1 May 2014	26%	66%	8%	1,235 Danish adults	Greens Analyseinstitut published in Børsen	
25–30 July 2014	30%	64%	6%	1,298 Danish adults	Greens Analyseinstitut published in Børsen	
22–27 August 2014	29%	64%	7%	1,222 Danish adults	Greens Analyseinstitut published in Børsen	
24–29 October 2014	28%	64%	8%	1,139 Danish adults	Greens Analyseinstitut published in Børsen	
21–26 November 2014	30%	61%	9%	1,165 Danish adults	Greens Analyseinstitut published in Børsen	
23–28 January 2015	31%	61%	8%	1,242 Danish adults	Greens Analyseinstitut published in Børsen	
20–26 February 2015	27%	64%	9%	1,179 Danish adults	Greens Analyseinstitut published in Børsen	
24–29 March 2015	28%	62%	10%	1,232 Danish adults	Greens Analyseinstitut published in Børsen	
22–26 May 2015	30%	60%	10%	961 Danish adults	Greens Analyseinstitut published in Børsen	
27 July – 3 August 2015	25%	66%	9%	1,205 Danish adults	Greens Analyseinstitut published in Børsen	
25–30 September 2015	25%	64%	11%	1,143 Danish adults	Greens Analyseinstitut published in Børsen	
27 November – 2 December 2015	22%	70%	8%	1,191 Danish adults	Greens Analyseinstitut published in Børsen	
22 – 27 January 2016	22%	67%	11%	1,196 Danish adults	Greens Analyseinstitut published in Børsen	
22 February – 1 March 2016	21%	71%	8%	1,211 Danish adults	Greens Analyseinstitut published in Børsen	
22–30 March 2016	22%	68%	10%	1,259 Danish adults	Greens Analyseinstitut published in Børsen	
21–27 April 2016	20%	67%	13%	1,223 Danish adults	Greens Analyseinstitut published in Børsen	
27 May – 2 June 2016	22%	69%	9%	1,448 Danish adults	Greens Analyseinstitut published in Børsen	
29 July – 3 August 2016	21%	68%	11%	1,245 Danish adults	Greens Analyseinstitut published in Børsen	
26 August – 1 September 2016	21%	69%	10%	1,263 Danish adults	Greens Analyseinstitut published in Børsen	
23–29 October 2016	23%	70%	7%	1,226 Danish adults	Greens Analyseinstitut published in Børsen	
28 October – 2 November 2016	24%	67%	9%	1,283 Danish adults	Greens Analyseinstitut published in Børsen	
2–7 December 2016	29%	62%	9%	1,249 Danish adults	Greens Analyseinstitut published in Børsen	
16–21 December 2016	26%	65%	9%	1,230 Danish adults	Greens Analyseinstitut published in Børsen	

Greens Analyseinstitut, a public opinion research company, has generally asked "How would you vote at a possible new referendum about participation of Denmark in the common currency?" ("Hvad ville du stemme ved en evt. ny folkeafstemning om Danmarks deltagelse i den fælles valuta?").

Public support for the euro in Denmark according to Eurobarometer polls

== Danish autonomous territories ==
The Faroe Islands currently use the Faroese króna, a localised version of the Danish krone, but legally the same currency. It is normally not accepted by shops in the mainland Denmark, or foreign exchange bureaus, however they can be exchanged 1:1 in Danish banks. Greenland uses ordinary Danish kroner, but has considered introducing its own currency, the Greenlandic krone, similar Faroese króna. Both territories continue to use Danish coins.

It remains unclear if Greenland and the Faroe Islands would adopt the euro should Denmark choose to do so. Both are parts of the Kingdom of Denmark, but remain outside the EU. They usually do not take part in EU related referendums.

== Possible euro coin design ==
Before Denmark's 2000 referendum on the issue, Danmarks Nationalbank and the Royal Mint were asked by the Ministry of Economics to propose possible designs for the future Danish euro coins. The suggested design was based on the designs of the Danish 10- and 20-krone coins, with Queen Margrethe II on the front, and the 25- and 50-øre coins, switching their back motif (a crown) to the front of the euro coins. However, Denmark did not adopt the euro during the reign of Margrethe II, so an updated design, revolving around her son King Frederik X, would be possible, should Denmark adopt the euro during his reign.

== See also ==
- Enlargement of the eurozone
- Denmark and the European Union
