= Robert Scharfe =

Robert Scharfe was born on 26 November 1953 and was the chief executive officer of the Luxembourg Stock Exchange (Bourse de Luxembourg), a post he held from 18 April 2012 to 21 April 2021.

He is chairman of the board of Fundsquare, a wholly owned subsidiary of the Luxembourg Stock Exchange, and a member of the board of FundsDLT.

In addition, he is a member of the board of directors of the Federation of European Securities Exchanges and the chairman of the nomination committee of the World Federation of Exchanges.

== Career ==
Acharfe began his career in 1977 at Banque Générale du Luxembourg (now BGL BNP Paribas) and up to 2012 held a variety of positions in the bank. These included terms as the head of financial markets from 1985 to 1994, head of private banking from 1994 to 1998 and CEO of the global markets business line from 2004 to 2007. He finished his time at this bank as a member of the management board in charge of corporate and investment banking.

He was a member of the board of directors of the Luxembourg Stock Exchange from April 2001 and in 2004 was elected vice-chairman, a mandate he held until his appointment as CEO.

He was also chairman of the board of Finesti, a wholly owned subsidiary of the Luxembourg Stock Exchange, from April 2012 until its integration in July 2013 into Fundsquare.

== Education and Personal ==
Scharfe holds a master's degree in economics from the University of Nancy, France. He is an alumnus of INSEAD, France and of Stanford Graduate School of Business, Palo Alto, USA. He is married and has three children.

== Footnotes ==
Business positions
Preceded by Michel Maquil	President and CEO Luxembourg Stock Exchange; 2012–2021	Succeeded by Julie Becker
