= Luxembourg Monetary Authority =

Former monetary authority of Luxembourg

Luxembourg Monetary Authority Institut Monétaire Luxembourgeois
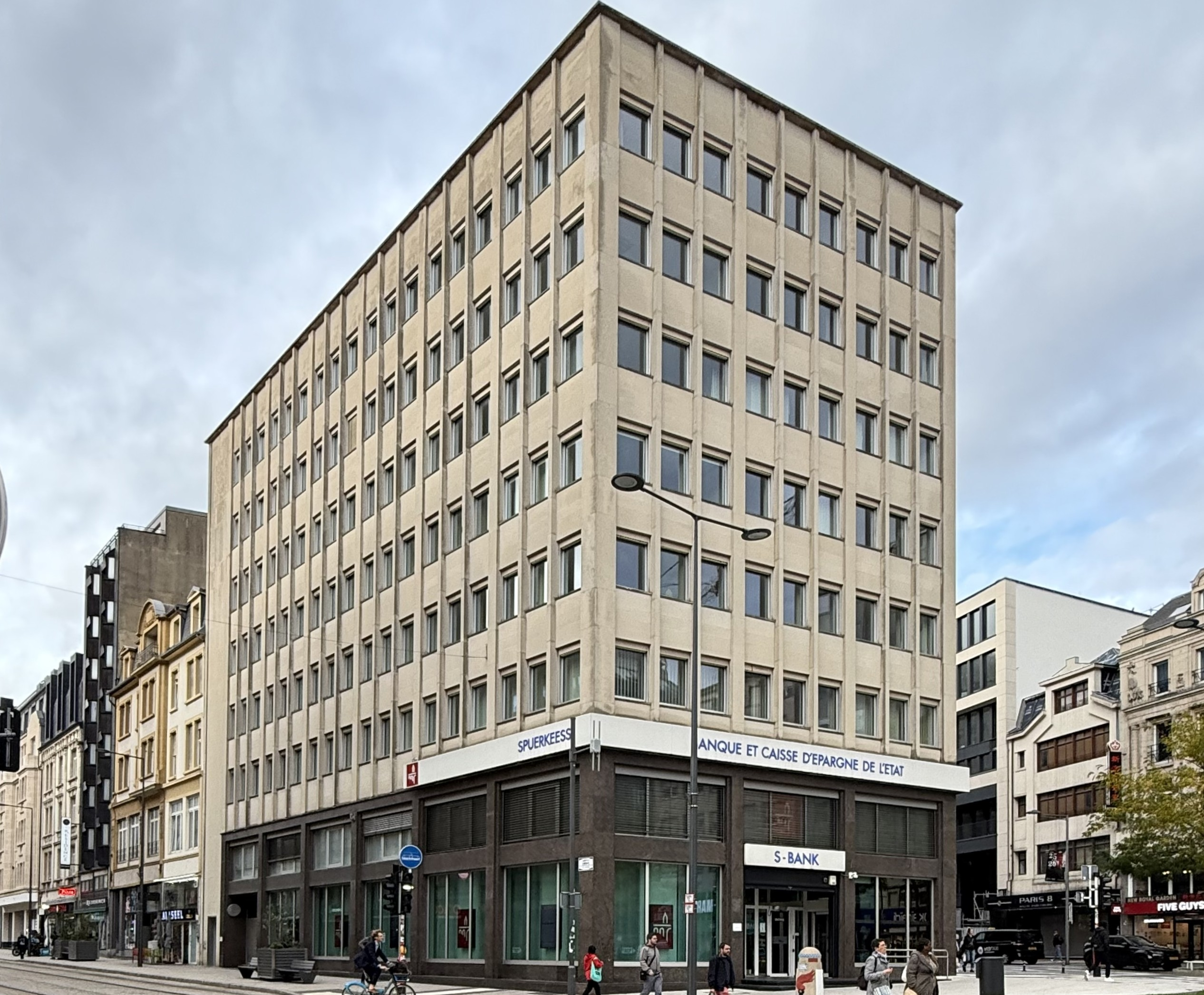
- Building at 63 avenue de la Liberté in Luxembourg City, the former seat of the IML
- Central bank of: Luxembourg
- Headquarters: Brussels
- Established: 1983
- Dissolved: 1998
- Ownership: Government of Luxembourg
- Succeeded by: Central Bank of Luxembourg, and the Commission de Surveillance du Secteur Financier

The Luxembourg Monetary Authority (IML) (French: Institut Monétaire Luxembourgeois) was the central bank of Luxembourg between its creation in 1983 and mid-1998, when its monetary and supervisory roles were taken over, respectively, by the newly created Central Bank of Luxembourg and Commission de Surveillance du Secteur Financier.

== History ==
=== Leading up to the establishment ===
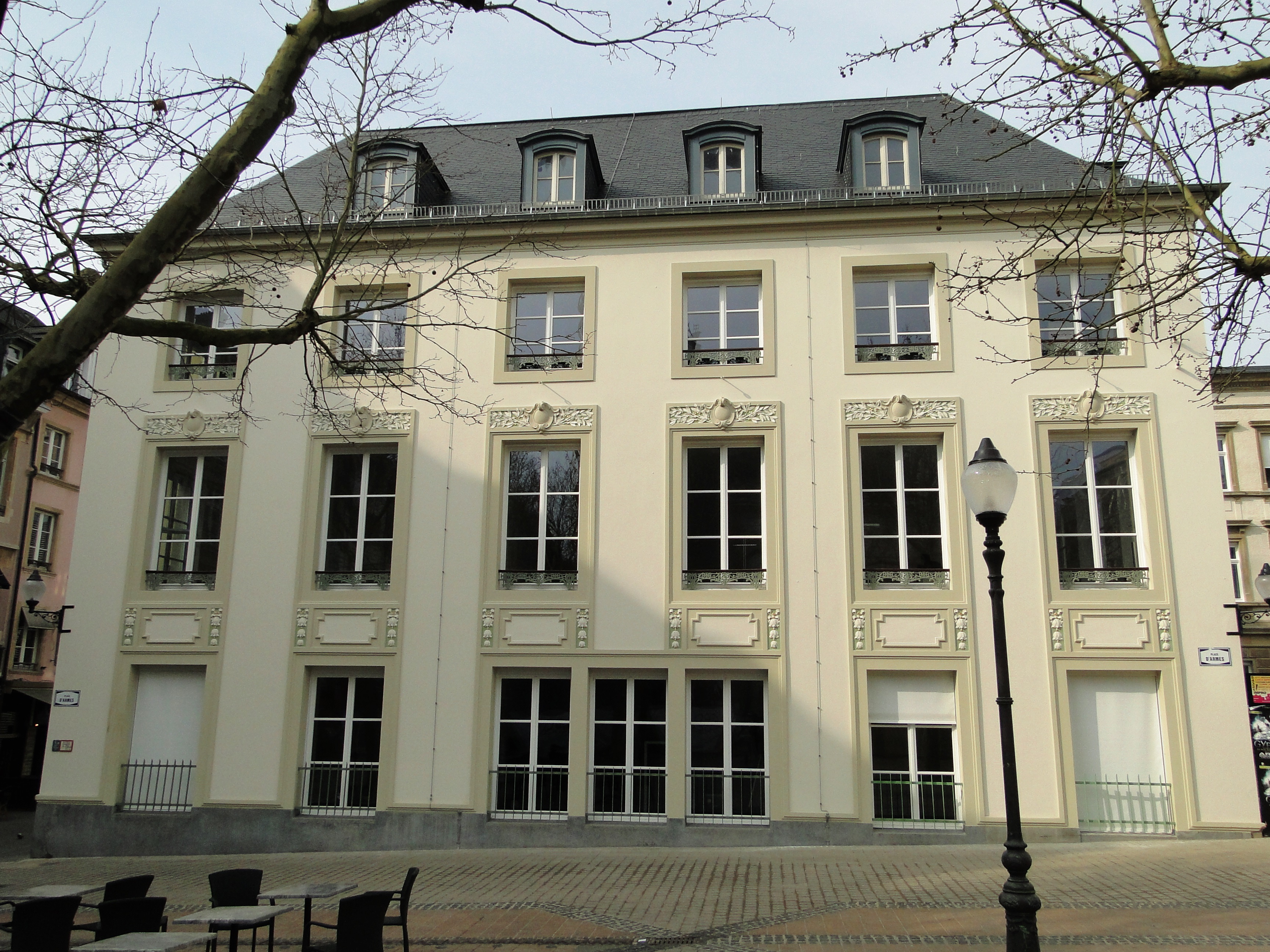
Hôtel de Gerden, short-lived seat of the Banque Nationale du Grand-Duché de Luxembourg from 1877 to 1881

During the 19th century, multiple currencies from other jurisdictions circulated and were accepted in Luxembourg. From 1856, the Banque Internationale à Luxembourg was authorized to issue banknotes, which it did in Belgian francs, Dutch florins, Prussian thalers, and Rhenish thaler. Another institution, the Banque Nationale du Grand-Duché de Luxembourg, was chartered to issue notes in 1873. From 1877 until its failure in 1881, it was located in the Hôtel de Gerden on the city's central Place d'Armes, lately the seat of the Court of Accounts of Luxembourg.

From 1918, Luxembourg in principle had a national currency, the Luxembourg franc, but the Belgium–Luxembourg Economic Union established in 1921 resulted in the Belgian franc being widely used in the country. From 1936 on, the National Bank of Belgium maintained a permanent office in Luxembourg City, delivering central banking services directly to economic agents there. These arrangements were suspended under the German occupation of Luxembourg during World War II but re-established in 1944 following the country's liberation.

In 1945, Luxembourg established its first banking supervisory authority, the Commissariat au Contrôle des Banques, at the time partly with the aim of deterring penetration of the domestic credit system by German banks.

=== Creation and development ===
In the 1970s, the demise of the Bretton Woods system prompted renewed thinking in Luxembourg about monetary arrangements. On 15 March 1978, national legislation was enacted that clarified the position of the Luxembourg franc in the definition of the European Currency Unit, and also stipulated the creation of the Institut Monétaire Luxembourgeois as a new Luxembourg institution. Follow-up discussions were protracted, however, not least because of disagreement about employment conditions for the future authority's employees. On 22 February 1982, Belgium unilaterally devalued the Belgian franc, triggering an acceleration of the Luxembourg debate about setting up the IML. The Werner-Thorn-Flesch Ministry also viewed the IML as desirable so that Luxembourg would be represented on an equal basis with other European countries in forthcoming negotiations about monetary arrangements, as the prospect of a future European Monetary Union became gradually more tangible. The IML was empowered to print banknotes, even though it did not conduct a monetary policy of its own, and also succeeded the Commissariat au Contrôle des Banques by taking over financial sector supervision. Pierre Werner, who in 1969–1970 had led the so-called Werner Plan for monetary union and was again prime minister from July 1979, was instrumental in the process that led to the IML's eventual establishment in 1983.

In 1993, the Luxembourg government approved new legislation to carry out the transition from the ad hoc IML to a fully-fledged central bank satisfying the governance criteria set in the Maastricht Treaty.

In March 1998, the IML acquired the former head office of Banque Internationale à Luxembourg on 2 Boulevard Royal, which would become the seat of the soon-to-be-created Central Bank of Luxembourg.

=== Aftermath ===
On 1 June 1998, the IML was replaced by the Central Bank of Luxembourg that became a founding member of the Eurosystem, while its supervisory role was transferred to a separate authority, the Commission de Surveillance du Secteur Financier.

== See also ==
- European Monetary Institute
- List of central banks
- List of banks in Luxembourg
