= Sunny Car Center =

Planned car sales centre in Finland

Coordinates: 61.0235°N 24.4059°E

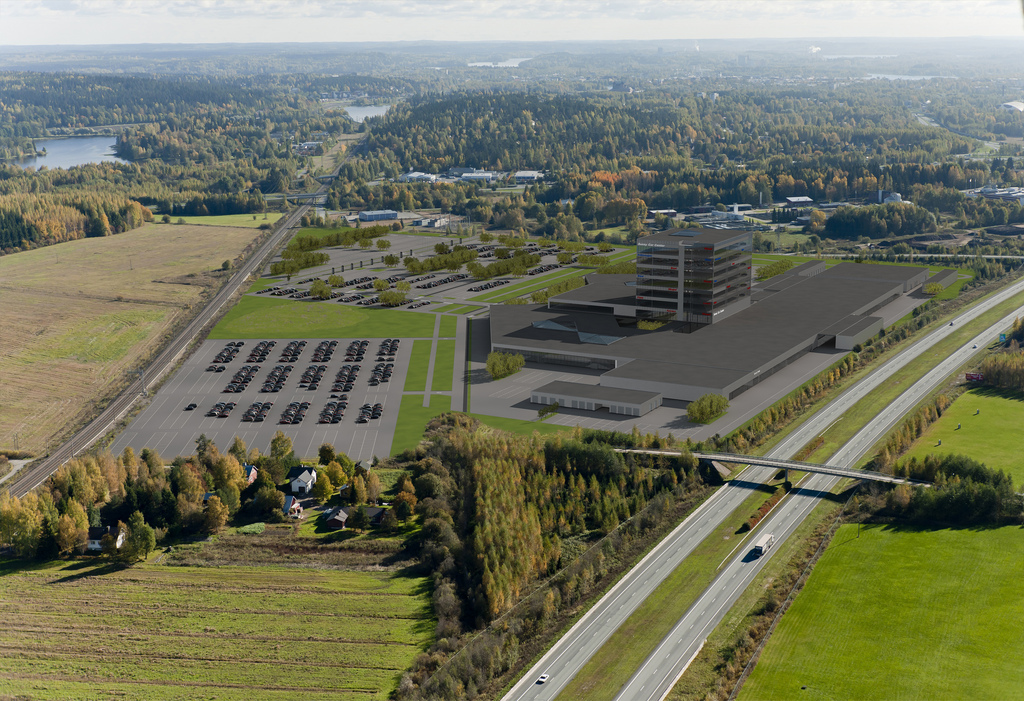
An artist's vision of what Sunny Car Center would have looked like had it ever been built.

Sunny Car Center was a planned car sales centre, planned to be built at the 27.5 hectare site between the highway and the railroad in Kirstula, Hämeenlinna, Finland. Plans for the centre included about 75 thousand square metres on several floors for car sales and associated activities. Had the centre been completed it would have become the largest car sales centre in Europe. The project underwent several difficulties, and it was finally abandoned when the sales of the land lot necessary for its construction was cancelled. The CEO of the project was Markku Ritaluoma. In 2023, Ritaluoma was sentenced to two years and six months of unconditional imprisonment for two aggravated frauds, aggravated debtor dishonesty and two aggravated tax frauds.

== Plan ==
Sunny Car Center was originally planned to have eight floors of sales and office space, rising to a height of 40 to 50 metres, but in later plans the building only had three floors. Services at the car sales centre would have included sales of new and used cars, service, sales of spare parts, a restaurant and a children's traffic world. It was proposed that the car sales centre would bring 600 to 800 new jobs to Hämeenlinna, with 200 man years' worth of work at the construction site. The plan was to make the centre into the largest car sales centre in Europe. According to a 2011 price estimate, the total cost of the project would have been about 100 million euro. The architectural design of the project was done by Paavo Sollamo Oy.

== Events ==
Kehittämiskeskus Oy Häme, together with the city of Hämeenlinna, had been searching for ways to make use of the Kirstula area. The best proposal was to concentrate car sales to the area. The city of Hämeenlinna also had plans to move the car sales of Kauriala to Kirstula, to vacate land from Kauriala to build apartment houses there. The working title for the project was Sunny Car Center, and it involved the city, Kehittämiskeskus Oy Häme and Virtaa Hämeeseen Oy.

The company responsible for the project was Sunny Trading Ltd, whose CEO was Markku Ritaluoma. He had previous business dealings with the Russians. In July 2010 he estimated the costs of the project to be about 85 million euro and said he had been having negotiations with American investors. The construction was planned to start in 2011 and be completed in 2013. In October 2010, the city of Hämeenlinna and Sunny Car Center signed a contract enabling the continuation of the planning. In October Esko Kiesi was announced as the new leader of the project.

The fate of the project was said to depend on the success of the land lot sales. According to the contract, the 8.4 million euro price for the land lot should have been entirely paid by 4 July 2014. At that time, Sunny Car Center gave a press release saying it had negotiated more time to find funding for the project with the city of Hämeenlinna.

The success of the land lot sales seemed improbable, because the foreign investors found for the project appeared to be Nigerian scammers, who would not be paying any money despite their promises, but instead had cheated Sunny Car Center. After the final deadline on 30 September 2014 came to pass it was announced that the agreed price had not been paid to the city, so the city appealed to the district court to have the sales contract annulled.

In autumn 2015 it was announced that Sunny Car Center had also previously been the victim of a scam. In 2013, the company responsible for the project had tried to find 100 million euro of funding for it from Africa. In order to secure the funding, Sunny Car Center had sent 150 thousand euro to an African contact. When no funds were received despite promises, the company asked for their own investment back. It was not returned, but instead the company was sent counterfeit 500 euro notes, with a nominal value of 94'500 euro. The matter was reported to the police in April 2014. The police were investigating the matter at that time.

In September 2015, the district court of Kanta-Häme declared Sunny Car Center bankrupt. In November, it was announced that the costs of the bankruptcy would be paid from the funds of the state and the taxpayers. Lammin Säästöpankki charged Sunny Car Center for over 310 thousand euro based on a verdict in October. Other debtors of the company included the Finnish tax bureau, Sähköpeko Oy and the ice hockey clubs JYP and HPK. By December 2015, a court verdict had only been given for the debt to Lammin Säästöpankki.

In 2023, Ritaluoma was sentenced to two years and six months of unconditional imprisonment for two aggravated frauds, aggravated debtor dishonesty and two aggravated tax frauds.

== In culture ==
The advertising column built on the lot designated for Sunny Car Center attracted media attention, and a Facebook group opposed to its dismantling was founded. The column was seen as a sort of a landmark, and it was used in humorous Internet memes.

== Sources ==
=== Further reading ===
- Juutilainen, Arno (2025). Sunny Car Center ja muita kuntapäättäjien surkuhupaisia liiketoimia (in Finnish). Johnny Kniga. ISBN 9789523621107.
