= European System of Central Banks =

EU executive body

The European System of Central Banks (ESCB) is an institution that comprises the European Central Bank (ECB) and the national central banks (NCBs) of all 27 member states of the European Union (EU). Its objective is to ensure price stability throughout the EU, and improve monetary and financial cooperation between eurozone and non-eurozone member states of the EU.

== Organization ==
The process of decision-making in the Eurosystem is centralized through the decision-making bodies of the ECB, namely the Governing Council and the Executive Board. As long as there are EU member states which have not adopted the euro, a third decision-making body, the General Council, shall also exist. The NCBs of the member states that do not participate in the eurozone are members of the ESCB with a special status – while they are allowed to conduct their respective national monetary policies, they do not take part in the decision-making with regard to the single monetary policy for the eurozone and the implementation of such decisions.

The Governing Council comprises all the members of the executive board and the governors of the NCBs of the member states without a derogation, that is, those countries which have adopted the euro. The main responsibilities of the Governing Council are:

- Adopt the guidelines and take the decisions necessary to ensure the performance of the tasks entrusted to the Eurosystem
- Formulate the monetary policy of the eurozone, including, as appropriate, decisions relating to intermediate monetary objectives, key interest rates, and the supply of reserves in the Eurosystem
- Establish the necessary guidelines for their implementation

The executive board comprises the President, the Vice-President and four other members, all chosen from among persons of recognized standing and professional experience in monetary or banking matters. They are appointed by common accord of the governments of the member states at the level of the Heads of State or Government, on a recommendation from the Council of Ministers after it has consulted the European Parliament and the Governing Council of the ECB (i.e., the Council of the European Monetary Institute (EMI) for the first appointments). The main responsibilities of the executive board are:

- Implement monetary policy in accordance with the guidelines and decisions laid down by the Governing Council of the ECB and, in doing so, to give the necessary instructions to the NCBs
- Execute those powers which have been delegated to it by the Governing Council of the ECB

The General Council comprises the President and the Vice-President and the governors of the NCBs of all 27 member states. The General Council performs the tasks which the ECB took over from the EMI and which, owing to the derogation of one or more member states, still have to be performed in Stage Three of Economic and Monetary Union (EMU). The General Council also contributes to:

- ECB's advisory functions
- Collection of statistical information
- Preparation of the ECB's annual reports
- Establishment of the necessary rules for standardising the accounting and reporting of operations undertaken by the NCBs
- Taking of measures relating to the establishment of the key for the ECB's capital subscription other than those already laid down in the Treaty
- Laying-down of the conditions of employment of the members of staff of the ECB
- Necessary preparations for irrevocably fixing the exchange rates of the currencies of the member states with a derogation against the euro

The Statute of the ESCB makes provision for the following measures to ensure security of tenure for NCB governors and members of the Executive Board:

- Minimum renewable term of office for national central bank governors of five years
- Minimum non-renewable term of office for members of the Executive Board of eight years (a system of staggered appointments was used for the first executive board for members other than the President in order to ensure continuity)
- Removal from office is only possible in the event of incapacity or serious misconduct; in this respect the Court of Justice of the European Union is competent to settle any disputes

== Member banks ==
The ESCB is composed of the European Central Bank and the national central banks of all 27 member states of the EU. The first section of the following list lists member states and their central banks that form the Eurosystem (plus the ECB), which set eurozone monetary policy. The second section lists member states and their central banks that maintain separate currencies.

State	Central Bank	Governor
Eurozone members (Eurosystem)
(European Union) Eurozone	European Central Bank	Christine Lagarde
Austria	Oesterreichische Nationalbank	Martin Kocher
Belgium	Nationale Bank van België; Banque nationale de Belgique; Belgische Nationalbank	Pierre Wunsch
Bulgaria	Българска Народна Банка (Bulgarska Narodna Banka)	Dimitar Radev
Croatia	Hrvatska narodna banka	Ante Žigman
Cyprus	Kεντρική Τράπεζα Κύπρου (Kentriki Trapeza Kyprou)	Christodoulos Patsalides
Estonia	Eesti Pank	Ülo Kaasik
Finland	Suomen Pankki; Finlands Bank	Olli Rehn
France	Banque de France	Emmanuel Moulin
Germany	Deutsche Bundesbank	Joachim Nagel
Greece	Τράπεζα της Ελλάδος (Trapeza tis Ellados)	Yannis Stournaras
Ireland	Banc Ceannais na hÉireann; Central Bank of Ireland	Gabriel Makhlouf
Italy	Banca d'Italia	Fabio Panetta
Latvia	Latvijas Banka	Mārtiņš Kazāks
Lithuania	Lietuvos bankas	Gediminas Šimkus
Luxembourg	Banque centrale du Luxembourg; Luxemburger Zentralbank	Gaston Reinesch
Malta	Bank Ċentrali ta’ Malta; Central Bank of Malta	Alexander Demarco
Netherlands	De Nederlandsche Bank	Klaas Knot
Portugal	Banco de Portugal	Mário Centeno
Slovakia	Národná banka Slovenska	Peter Kažimír
Slovenia	Banka Slovenije	Boštjan Vasle
Spain	Banco de España	José Luis Escrivá
Non-eurozone (outside Eurosystem)
Czech Republic	Česká národní banka	Aleš Michl
Denmark	Danmarks Nationalbank	Christian Kettel Thomsen
Hungary	Magyar Nemzeti Bank	Mihály Varga
Poland	Narodowy Bank Polski	Adam Glapiński
Romania	Banca Națională a României	Mugur Constantin Isărescu
Sweden	Sveriges Riksbank	Erik Thedéen
