= 500 euro note =

Banknote of the European Union

Five hundred euro
- Country: Eurozone (mainly) and other countries
- Value: 500 euro
- Width: 160 mm
- Height: 82 mm
- Security features: Hologram patch with perforations, EURion constellation, watermarks, microprinting, ultraviolet ink, raised printing, security thread, matted surface, see through number, colour-changing ink, barcodes and serial number
- Material used: Cotton fibre
- Years of printing: 1999–2014 (Note: The €500 banknotes were issued until 2019, but were actually last printed in 2014.)

Obverse
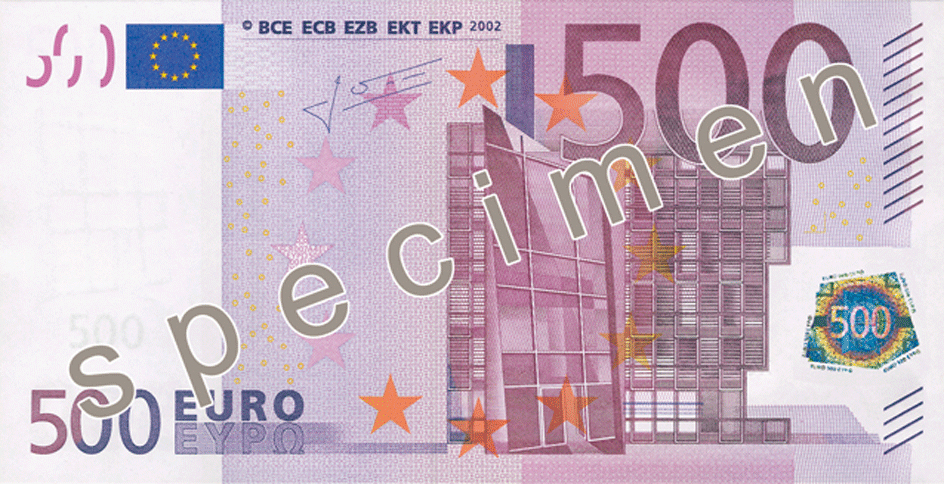
- Design: Window in Modern architecture
- Designer: Robert Kalina
- Design date: 3 December 1996

Reverse
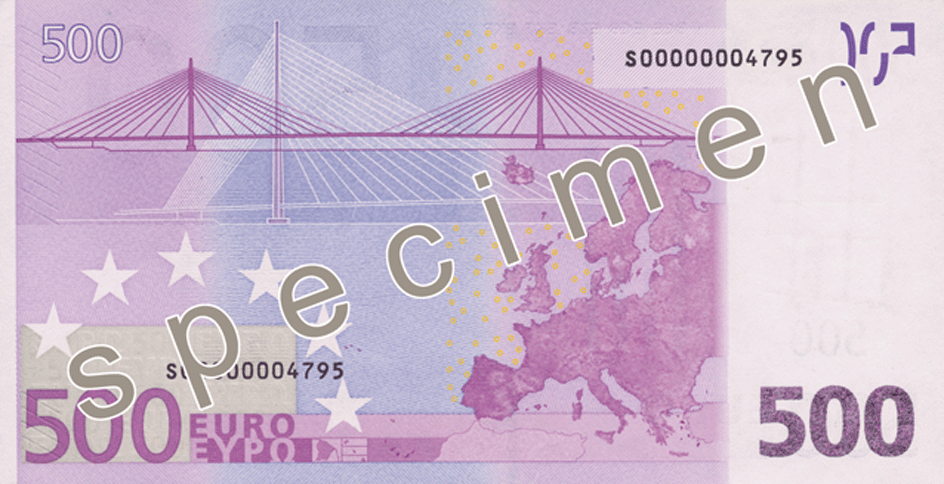
- Design: Cable-stayed bridge in Modern architecture and map of Europe.
- Designer: Robert Kalina
- Design date: 3 December 1996

The five-hundred-euro note (€500) is the highest-value euro banknote; it was produced from the introduction of the euro (in its cash form) in 2002 to 2019. Since 27 April 2019, the banknote has no longer been issued by central banks in the euro area, but it continues to be legal tender and can be used as a means of payment.

It is one of the highest-value circulating banknotes in the world, worth very roughly 600 USD, 85,000 JPY, 400 GBP, or 500 CHF (however less worth than a 1000 CHF note). (Note: These rough equivalences are not intended to be exact at any specific moment in time, just be sufficiently close to reality to give an approximate comparison with a more familiar currency. For today's exact rate, please consult a currency conversion site.)

The note is the official currency of 21 of the 27 member states of the European Union, which are part of the Eurozone. The 21 Eurozone members are: Austria, Belgium, Bulgaria, Croatia, Cyprus, Estonia, Finland, France, Germany, Greece, Ireland, Italy, Latvia, Lithuania, Luxembourg, Malta, the Netherlands, Portugal, Slovakia, Slovenia, and Spain.

A number of non-EU member states, namely Andorra, Monaco, San Marino, and Vatican City have formal agreements with the EU to use the euro as their official currency and issue their own coins. In addition, Kosovo and Montenegro have adopted the euro unilaterally.

The countries that use the euro have a total population of about 350 million currently.

Initially, the high denomination notes were introduced very rapidly, so that in the first seven years (up to December 2008) there were 530 million five-hundred-euro banknotes in circulation. Subsequently, the rate of increase was radically slowed. In July 2023, there were approximately 281 million banknotes in circulation (decreased from 614 million in 2015). It is the least widely circulated denomination, accounting for 0.9% of the total number of banknotes.

It is the largest note, measuring 160 × 82 mm, and has a purple colour scheme. The note depicts bridges and arches/doorways in modern architecture. The €500 note contains several complex security features such as watermarks, invisible ink, holograms and microprinting that make counterfeiting very difficult.

The note is being phased out due to concerns of widespread use for illegal purposes. Printing of new €500 notes ceased in 2019, although existing notes will remain legal tender until further notice.

== History ==
The euro was founded on 1 January 1999, when it became the currency of over 300 million people in Europe. For the first three years of its existence it was an invisible currency, only used in accountancy. Euro cash was not introduced until 1 January 2002, when it replaced the national banknotes and coins of the 12 initial eurozone countries.

Slovenia joined the Eurozone on 1 January 2007, Cyprus and Malta on 1 January 2008, Slovakia on 1 January 2009, Estonia on 1 January 2011, Latvia on 1 January 2014, Lithuania on 1 January 2015, Croatia on 1 January 2023 and Bulgaria on 1 January 2026.

=== The changeover period ===
The changeover period during which the former currencies' notes and coins were exchanged for those of the euro lasted about two months, going from 1 January 2002 until 28 February 2002. The official date on which the national currencies ceased to be legal tender varied from member state to member state. The earliest date was in Germany, where the mark officially ceased to be legal tender on 31 December 2001, though the exchange period lasted for two months more. Even after the old currencies ceased to be legal tender, they continued to be accepted by national central banks for periods ranging from ten years to forever.

=== Design changes ===
Notes printed before November 2003 bear the signature of the first president of the European Central Bank, Wim Duisenberg, who was replaced on 1 November 2003 by Jean-Claude Trichet, whose signature appears on issues from November 2003 to March 2012. Notes issued after March 2012 bear the signature of the third ECB President Mario Draghi.

Until May 2013 there was only one series of euro notes, however a new series, similar to the first one, was planned to be released. The bank notes would be replaced in ascending order. Therefore, the first new note was the five-euro note that has been in circulation since 2 May 2013. Its new design was made public on 10 January 2013 in the Archaeological Museum of Frankfurt (Germany).

The 500-euro denomination will not be included in the new series as it was decided to phase out issuance of 500-euro banknotes.

=== End of production and issuance ===
The European Central Bank announced on 4 May 2016 that it would stop issuing the 500-euro notes by the end of 2018. This decision was due to the suspicion that the notes were widely used for illegal purposes, according to a high-ranking bank official, Benoît Cœuré. The notes were last printed in 2014, and until 2019 the demand was satisfied from stocks.

On 27 January 2019, 17 of 19 Eurosystem's central banks stopped issuing and distributing €500 banknotes. To ensure a smooth transition and for logistic reasons, the Deutsche Bundesbank and the Oesterreichische Nationalbank opted for a longer period, and issued these banknotes until 26 April 2019. Circulating 500-euro notes remain legal tender and can continue to be used as a means of payment and store of value until further notice. Banks, bureaux de change and other commercial parties can keep recirculating the existing notes. The date when euro banknotes of the first series cease to be legal tender will be announced "well in advance" by ECB. Banknotes will always retain their value and can be exchanged for an unlimited period of time at the Eurosystem central banks.

== Design ==
The five-hundred-euro note measures 160 mm (6.3 in) × 82 mm (3.2 in). It has a purple color scheme. Each denomination of Euro bank notes depicts bridges and arches/doorways in a different historical European style; the five-hundred-euro note shows Modern architecture (around the 20th century). Although Robert Kalina's original designs were intended to show real monuments, for political reasons the bridge and art are merely hypothetical examples of the architectural era.

Like all euro notes, it contains the denomination, the EU flag, the signature of the president of the ECB and the initials of that bank in different EU languages, a map of Europe, a depiction of EU territories overseas, the stars from the EU flag and twelve security features as listed below.

=== Security features ===
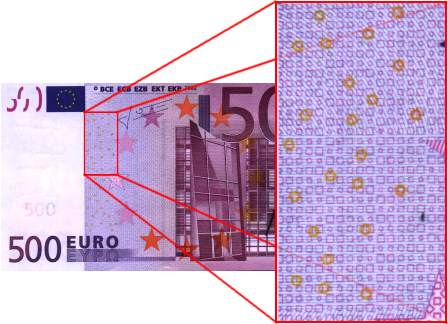
The EURion constellation on the 500-euro note

The five-hundred-euro note is protected by:

- Color changing ink used on the numeral located on the back of the note, that appears to change color from purple to brown, when the note is tilted.
- A transparent number printed in the top corner of the note, on both sides, appear to combine perfectly to form the value numeral when held against the light.
- A hologram, used on the note which appears to see the hologram image change between the value and a window or doorway, but in the background, it appears to be rainbow-coloured concentric circles of micro-letters moving from the centre to the edges of the patch.
- A EURion constellation; the EURion constellation is a pattern of symbols found on a number of banknote designs worldwide since about 1996. It is added to help software detect the presence of a banknote in a digital image.
- Watermarks, which appear when held up to the light.
- Raised printing in the main image, the lettering and the value numerals on the front of the banknotes will be raised.
- Ultraviolet ink; the paper itself does not glow, fibres embedded in the paper do appear, and be coloured red, blue and green, the EU flag is green and has orange stars, the ECB President's, currently Mario Draghi's, signature turns green, the large stars and small circles on the front glow and the European map, a bridge and the value numeral on the back appear in yellow.
- Microprinting, on various areas of the banknotes there is microprinting, for example, inside the "ΕΥΡΩ" (EURO in Greek characters) on the front. The micro-text is sharp, not blurred.
- A security thread, embedded in the banknote paper. The thread will appear as a dark stripe when held up to the light. The word "EURO" and the value is embedded in tiny letters on the thread.
- Perforations in the hologram which will form the euro symbol. There are also small numbers showing the value.
- A matted surface; the note paper is made out of pure cotton, which feels crisp and firm, but not limp or waxy.
- A serial number.

== Crime ==
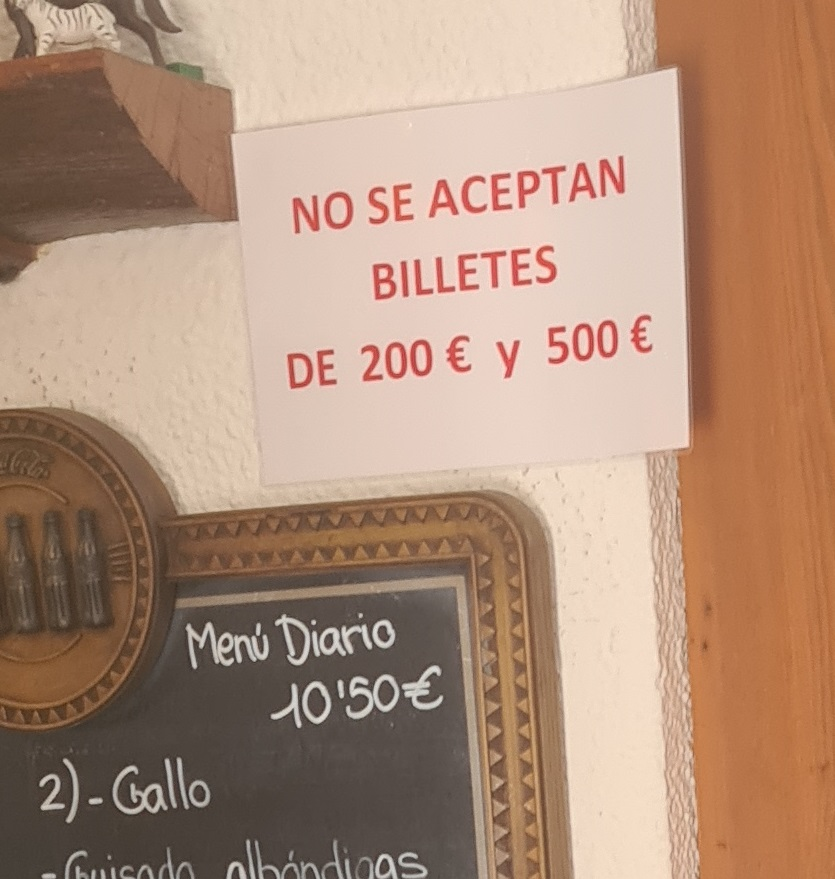
Sign in Spain, saying that 200 or 500 euro banknotes are not accepted

The value of the note is much greater than the largest circulating notes of most other major currencies, such as the United States 100-dollar note or the Bank of England's 50-pound note. Thus a large monetary value can be concentrated into a small volume of notes. This facilitates crimes that deal in cash, including money laundering, drug dealing, and tax evasion. There have been calls to withdraw the note for this reason. However, some of the currencies the euro replaced had widely used high-value notes, including the 5,000 Austrian schillings (€363), the 1,000 Dutch guilders (€454), the 1,000 Deutsche Marks (€511), and the 500 Latvian lats (€711).

Even though there were some high-value banknotes in the national currencies of Germany, Austria and the Netherlands, the number of banknotes was relatively small compared to the euro banknotes. At the end of 2000 there were 89.20 million 1,000 Deutsche Mark banknotes, 13.97 million 5,000 Austrian Schilling banknotes and 13.28 million 1,000 Dutch Guilder banknotes in circulation. Latvia had a negligible number of 500 lat banknotes. In contrast the European Central Bank ordered the production of 371 million €500 banknotes before 1 July 2002.

In particular, a quarter of these high-value notes were within the borders of Spain in 2006. This concentration of €500 notes was far greater than expected for an economy of Spain's size; prior to conversion to euro the largest banknote was 10,000 Spanish pesetas, worth about €60. These notes are rarely seen in every-day commerce – they have been nicknamed "Bin Ladens" by the populace (as the presence and appearance of the notes are well-known, but the notes themselves are quite difficult to find). The financial analyst Jeffrey Robinson had warned back in 1998 before issuance that he believed that the €500 note would be used mostly for drug trafficking and money laundering. British and Spanish police have used the notes to track money laundering.

As of 20 April 2010, money exchange offices in the United Kingdom were banned from selling €500 notes due to their use in money laundering. The Serious Organised Crime Agency (SOCA) stated that "90% of all €500 notes sold in the UK are in the hands of organised crime", revealed during an eight-month analysis. As of May 2023, €500 was equivalent to about £440, depending on exchange rates (around nine times the value of the Bank of England's largest publicly circulated note of £50), and had, according to SOCA, become the currency choice for criminal gangs to hide their profits.

The EU directive 2005/06/EC "on the prevention of the use of the financial system for the purpose of money laundering and terrorist financing" tries to prevent such crime by requiring banks, real estate agents, tax and business advisors or agents, casinos and more companies to investigate and report usage of cash in excess of €15,000.

In Denmark, which is an EU member state but which is not in the Eurozone, all transactions involving €500 notes have been banned since January 2020.

== Circulation ==
The European Central Bank closely monitors the circulation and stock of the euro coins and banknotes. It is a task of the Eurosystem to ensure an efficient and smooth supply of euro notes and to maintain their integrity throughout the euro area.

The first set of €500 banknotes was introduced in January 2002. The number of banknotes in circulation increased each year until 2011. From 2011 until 2013 there was a temporary decrease in the quantity of circulated banknotes.

The €500 banknote peaked at the end of March 2009 at 36.9% of the value of all euro banknotes. Circulation by number of notes peaked at 613,559,542 banknotes in December 2015 when it was decided not to include this denomination in the new Europa series. The number of circulating banknotes has quite rapidly decreased ever since.

The figures are as follows:

Date	Banknotes	€ Value
January 2002	60,617,094	30,308,547,000
December 2002	166,863,335	83,431,667,500
December 2003	238,473,202	119,236,601,000
December 2004	306,229,737	153,114,868,500
December 2005	370,343,604	185,171,802,000
December 2006	419,381,674	209,690,837,000
December 2007	452,651,817	226,325,908,500
December 2008	530,064,413	265,032,206,500
December 2009	563,782,341	281,891,170,500
December 2010	575,851,727	287,925,863,500
November 2011	599,763,921	299,881,960,500
January 2012	596,125,001	298,062,500,500
April 2013	585,677,005	292,838,502,500
December 2014	606,043,923	303,021,961,500
December 2015	613,559,542	306,779,771,000
January 2016	611,833,416	305,916,708,000
December 2017	513,519,219	256,759,609,000
December 2018	521,630,046	260,815,023,000
December 2019	446,035,065	223,017,532,500
December 2020	405,707,688	202,853,844,000
December 2021	373,474,818	186,737,409,000
December 2022	300,831,023	150,415,511,500
December 2023	266,681,883	133,340,941,500
December 2024	238,064,874	119,032,437,000
December 2025	210,367,338	105,183,669,000

== Legal information ==
Legally, both the European Central Bank and the central banks of the eurozone countries have the right to issue the seven different euro banknotes. In practice, only the national central banks of the zone physically issue and withdraw euro banknotes. The European Central Bank does not have a cash office and is not involved in any cash operations.
