= E-file.lu =

e-file is an electronic filing and communication platform in Luxembourg for secure transmission of data, documents and regulatory reports between financial institutions and Luxembourg authorities. It is broadly equivalent to the SEC’s EDGAR system in the USA or the FSA’s GABRIEL platform in the UK.

E-file was conceived and developed by Luxembourg Stock Exchange and Fundsquare in cooperation with the CSSF, Luxembourg’s financial regulatory authority.

== Data transmission ==
It allows both automatic and manual transmission of data. The e-file platform permits the transmission of formatted documents as well as data flows in XBRL or XML format. This flexibility and the modular architecture make transmission independent from the types of data and documents.

== Secure transmission ==
E-file transmissions take place in a secure environment complying with the European and domestic regulatory requirements through data encryption, 1024/2048 bits SSL certificates and HTTPS connection. Such secure transmission is used for mandatory transmission of regulatory bank reports to the Luxembourg Central Bank (BCL) and the CSSF.

== Bank reporting ==
E-file is also used for electronic bank reporting required under Basel II, IRFS and MiFID as well as for other legal and statistical reporting to the Luxembourg Central Bank (BCL) and the CSSF. Automated reports are transmitted in XBRL or XML format.

== UCI reporting ==
In September 2008 the Luxembourg’s financial regulatory authority CSSF issued a circular 08/371 resulting in the official adoption of the e-file platform for the mandatory transmission of UCI simplified and full prospectuses and annual and semi-annual reports both to the CSSF and to the electronic reference database of the financial centre’s investment funds set up by Fundsquare. The platform allows the final validation of the documents that are to be sent.

== See also ==
- CSSF Commission de Surveillance du Secteur Financier (Luxembourg)
- Banque Centrale de Luxembourg Regulatory reporting
