= Luxembourg franc =

Currency of Luxembourg from 1854 to 2002

franc luxembourgeois (French); luxemburgischer Franken (German); Lëtzebuerger Frang (Luxembourgish)
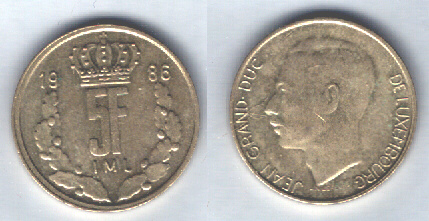
- 1 Luxembourg 5 franc, 1986

ISO 4217
- Code: LUF

Units of account
- Base unit: franc
- Plural: francs (French); Franken (German); Frang (Luxembourgish)
- Symbol: F
- Subunit
- 1/100: centime (French) cent (German)
- Plural
- centime (French) cent (German): centimes (French) cent (German)
- Symbol
- centime (French) cent (German): Cmes

Denominations
- Banknotes
- Freq. used: 100F, 1000F, 5000F.^{1}
- Rarely used: 20F, 50F
- Coins
- Freq. used: 1F, 5F, 20F & 50F
- Rarely used: 25 Cmes

Demographics
- User(s): None, previously: Belgium, Luxembourg (both alongside Belgian Franc)

Issuance
- Central bank: Institut Monétaire Luxembourgeois (1984-1999); Central Bank of Luxembourg (1999-2001)
- Website: www.bcl.lu
- Printer: Bradbury Wilkinson and Company; De La Rue
- Website: www.delarue.com

Valuation
- Pegged with: Belgian franc at par

EU Exchange Rate Mechanism (ERM)
- Since: 13 March 1979
- Fixed rate since: 31 December 1998
- Replaced by euro, non cash: 1 January 1999
- Replaced by euro, cash: 1 March 2002
- 1 € =: 40.3399F
- This infobox shows the latest status before this currency was rendered obsolete.^{1}Belgian franc coins were also used^{2}Belgian franc notes (including 10,000 fr.) were also used

The Luxembourg franc (F or ISO LUF, Luxembourgish: Frang), subdivided into 100 centimes, was the currency of Luxembourg between 1854 and 2002, except from 1941 to 1944. From 1944 to 2002, its value was equal to that of the Belgian franc. The franc remained in circulation until 2002, when it was replaced by the euro.

== History ==
The conquest of most of western Europe by Revolutionary and Napoleonic France led to the French franc's wide circulation, including in Luxembourg. However, incorporation into the Netherlands in 1815 resulted in the Dutch guilder becoming Luxembourg's currency. Following Belgium's independence from the Netherlands, the Belgian franc was adopted in 1839 and circulated in Luxembourg until 1842 and again from 1848. Between 1842 and 1848, Luxembourg (as part of the German Zollverein) used the Prussian Thaler.

In 1854, Luxembourg began issuing its own franc, at par with the Belgian franc (BF/FB). The Luxembourg franc followed the Belgian franc into the Latin Monetary Union in 1865. In 1926, Belgium withdrew from the Latin Monetary Union. However, the 1921 monetary union of Belgium and Luxembourg survived, forming the basis for the full Belgium-Luxembourg Economic Union in 1932. In 1935, the link between the Luxembourg and Belgian francs was revised, with 1 F = 1 1/4 BF.

In May 1940, the franc was pegged to the German Reichsmark at a rate of 4 francs = 1 Reichsmark. This was changed to 10 F = 1 Reichsmark in July 1940. On 26 August 1940, the Reichsmark was declared legal tender in Luxembourg and on 20 January 1941, the Reichsmark was declared the only legal tender, and the franc was abolished. The Luxembourg franc was reestablished in 1944, once more tied to the Belgian franc at par.

In August 1993, the European Exchange Rate Mechanism expanded its intervention margin to 15% to accommodate speculation against the French franc and other currencies. As a contingency measure against the pressure this generated on European currencies, the Finance Minister, Jean-Claude Juncker, secretly had a new series of Luxembourg franc notes printed. The new currency which would not be pegged to the Belgian franc. As a security measure, the notes depicted Grand Duchess Charlotte, who had died in 1985. This was done to preserve the secret, as Juncker believed that nobody would believe that new banknotes would feature a former monarch. Besides Juncker, only Grand Duke Jean and Prime Minister Jacques Santer were aware of the scheme. The notes were never used, and were burned by the Army in 1999 on the day that the euro was introduced. In 2019, Juncker, by then President of the European Commission, made the story public at a European Central Bank meeting.

The Luxembourg franc was fixed at €1 = 40.3399 F on 1 January 1999. From 1999 to 2002, the franc was officially a subdivision of the euro (€1 = 40.3399 F), but the euro did not circulate in physical form before 1 January 2002. Under the principle of "no obligation and no prohibition", financial transactions could be conducted in euros and francs, but physical payments could be made only in francs, as euro notes and coins were not available yet. Euro coins and banknotes were introduced on 1 January 2002. Old franc coins and notes lost their legal tender status on 1 March 2002.

While, like Belgian franc coins, Luxembourg franc coins ceased to be convertible to euros on 31 December 2004, Luxembourg franc banknotes remain convertible to euros indefinitely at the Central Bank of Luxembourg.

== Use of Belgian franc ==
Between 1944 and 2002, 1 Luxembourg franc was equal to 1 Belgian franc. Belgian francs were legal tender in Luxembourg, and Luxembourg francs were legal tender in Belgium. Nevertheless, payments in Luxembourg banknotes were commonly refused by shopkeepers in Belgium, either through ignorance or from fear that their other customers would refuse the banknotes (again, either through ignorance or from fear of being denied payment with it later), forcing them to go through the hassle of a trip to their bank to redeem the value of the banknote.

With a few early exceptions, the coins were identical in size, shape, and composition. Although they had distinct designs, the coins circulated in both Luxembourg and Belgium.

== Coins ==
The first coins were issued in 1854, in denominations of 2 1/2, 5 and 10 centimes. In 1901, the bronze 5- and 10-centime pieces were replaced by cupro-nickel coins. In 1915–1916, zinc 5-, 10- and 25-centime coins were issued by the occupying German forces. After the First World War, iron coins were issued in the same denominations before cupronickel was reintroduced in 1924, along with nickel 1- and 2-franc coins. The franc coins bore the inscription "Bon Pour", implying that they were tokens "good for" 1 or 2 francs. Such inscriptions also appeared on contemporary French and Belgian coins.

In 1929, Luxembourg's first silver coins since the late 18th century were issued, 5 and 10 francs. Bronze 5, 10 (smaller than earlier issues) and 25 centimes and nickel 50 centimes were introduced in 1930. The last coins before World War II were cupronickel 25-centime and 1-franc pieces issued in 1938 and 1939.

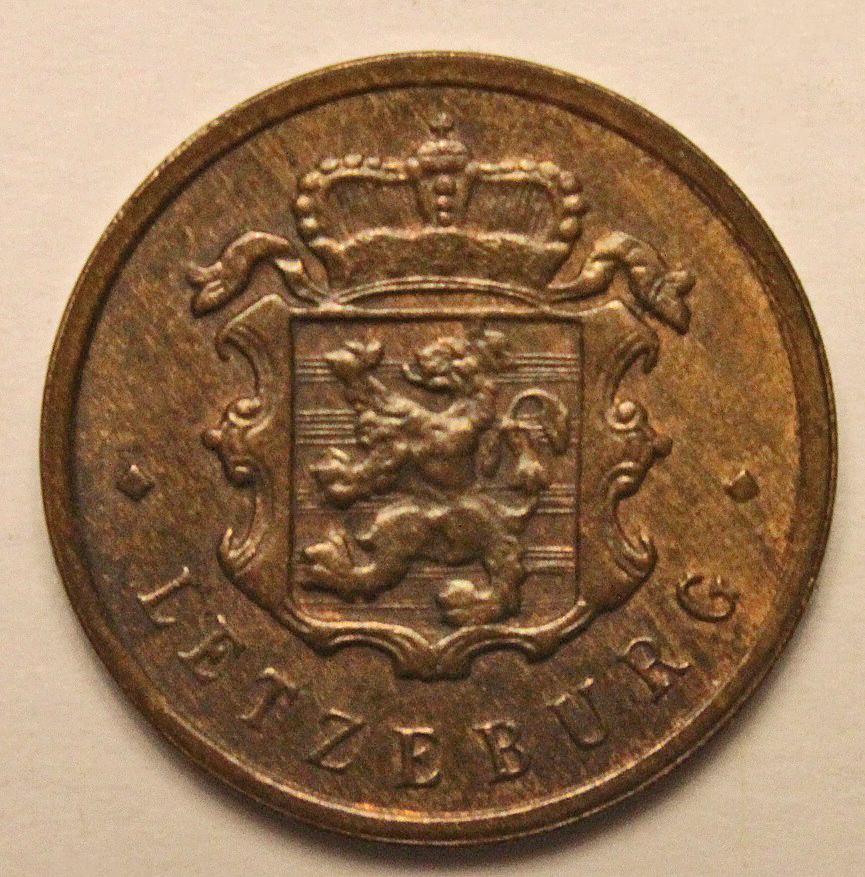
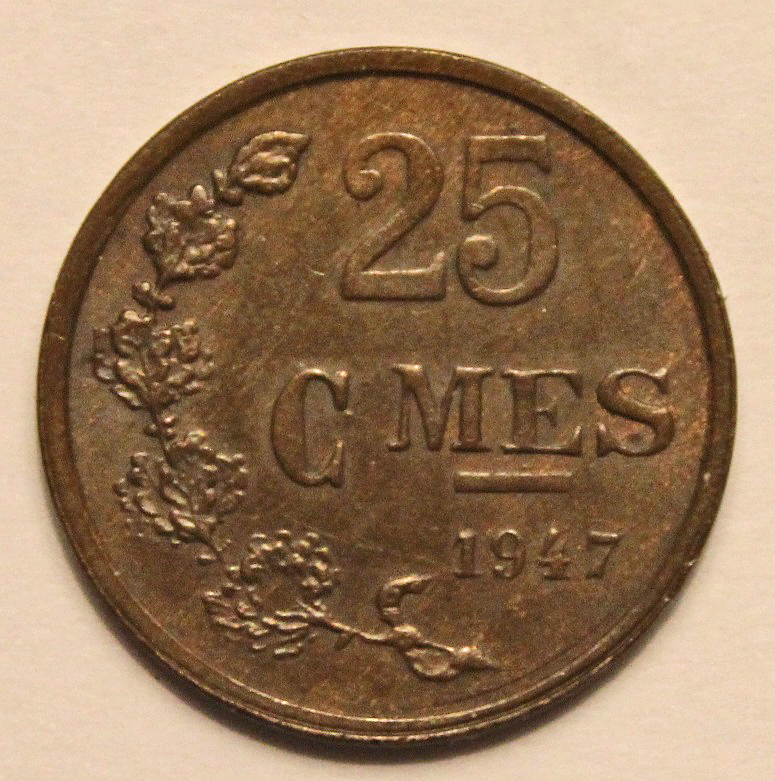
Post-war Luxembourgish 25 centimes coin, minted in 1947

The first coins issued after the war were bronze 25-centime and cupro-nickel 1-franc coins introduced in 1946. These were followed by cupronickel 5-franc coins in 1949. In 1952, the size of the 1-franc coin was reduced to match that of the Belgian 1-franc coin introduced in 1950. From this time on, all new Luxembourg coins matched the sizes and compositions of their Belgian counterparts, although the 25-centime (roughly €0.01) coin was not changed to match the Belgian counterpart introduced in 1964. In 1971, nickel 10-franc (roughly €0.25) coins were introduced, followed by bronze 20-franc (roughly €0.50) coins in 1980 and nickel 50-franc (roughly €1.24) coins in 1987. The size and composition of the 1- and 5-franc coins were again altered in 1988 and 1986 respectively to match their Belgian counterparts.

As Luxembourg has a relatively small population, and with Belgian coins so abundantly circulating, it was seldom necessary for Luxembourg to issue coinage on a year by year basis, especially in later years during design changes when large numbers of coins were minted in Brussels to supply the small country for many years at a time. As a result, some dates appear in mint sets only, while many other dates saw no standard issue coins minted at all. Many earlier dates changed frequently, with larger denominations often being single year designs.

Grand Duke Jean issue (1964-1991)
Image	Value	Technical parameters			Description			Issued from	Withdrawn	Lapse
Image	Value	Diameter (mm)	Mass (g)	Composition	Edge	Obverse	Reverse	Issued from	Withdrawn	Lapse
	25 c	19.00	0.76	Aluminium: 97% Magnesium: 3%	Smooth	Coat of arms; Lettering: Lëtzebuerg	Oak leaves; value; year of issue	1954–1972	2002	2004
	1 F	21.00	4.00	Cupronickel	Reeded	Grand Duke Jean	Crown and wreath; value; year of issue	1964–1985; 1986–1987	2002	2004
	1 F	18.00	2.75	Iron: 94%, Nickel: 6%	Smooth	Grand Duke Jean	Crown; value; year of issue; Lettering: Lëtzebuerg	1988–1991	2002	2004
	5 F	24.00	6.00	Cupronickel	Reeded	Grand Duke Jean	Crown and oak leaves; value; year of issue	1971–1981	2002	2004
	5 F	24.00	5.50	Copper: 92% Aluminium: 6% Nickel: 2%	Smooth	Grand Duke Jean	Crown and oak leaves; value; year of issue	1986–1988	2002	2004
	5 F	24.00	5.50	Copper: 92% Aluminium: 6% Nickel: 2%	Smooth	Grand Duke Jean	Crown; value; year of issue; Lettering: Lëtzebuerg	1989–1990	2002	2004
	10 F	27.00	8.00	Nickel	Smooth	Grand Duke Jean	Crown; value; year of issue	1971-1980	1986	1986
	20 F	25.65	8.50	Copper: 92% Nickel: 6% Aluminium: 2%	Ornamental	Grand Duke Jean	Crown and oak leaves; value; year of issue	1980–1983	2002	2004
	20 F	25.65	8.50	Copper: 92% Nickel: 6% Aluminium: 2%	Ornamental	Grand Duke Jean	Crown; value; year of issue; Lettering: Lëtzebuerg	1990	2002	2004
	50 F	22.75	7.00	Nickel	Reeded	Grand Duke Jean	Crown; value; year of issue	1987–1989	2002	2004
	50 F	22.75	7.00	Nickel	Reeded	Grand Duke Jean	Crown; value; year of issue; Lettering: Lëtzebuerg	1989–1991	2002	2004

== Banknotes ==
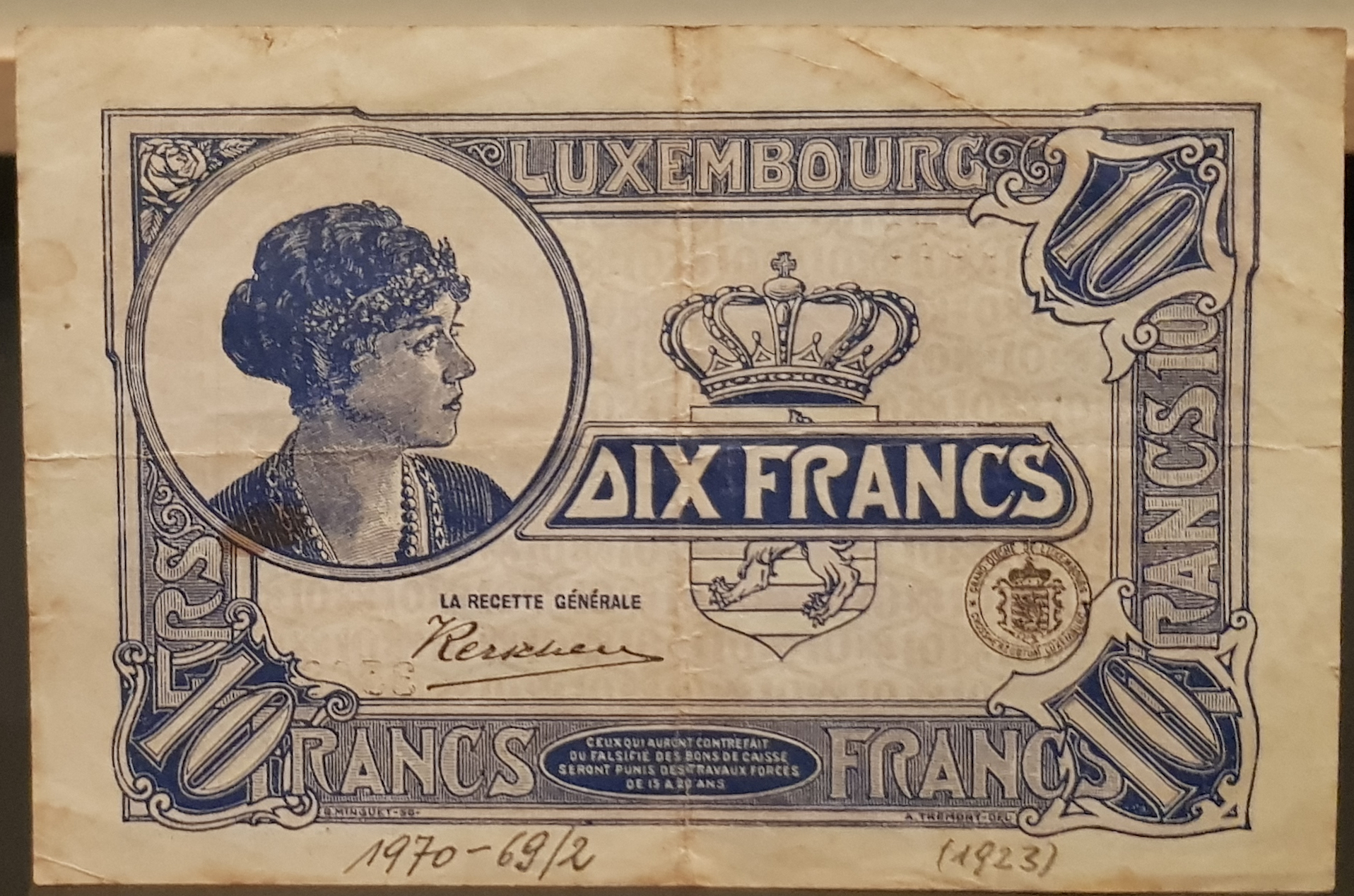
10 Luxembourg franc banknote (1924).

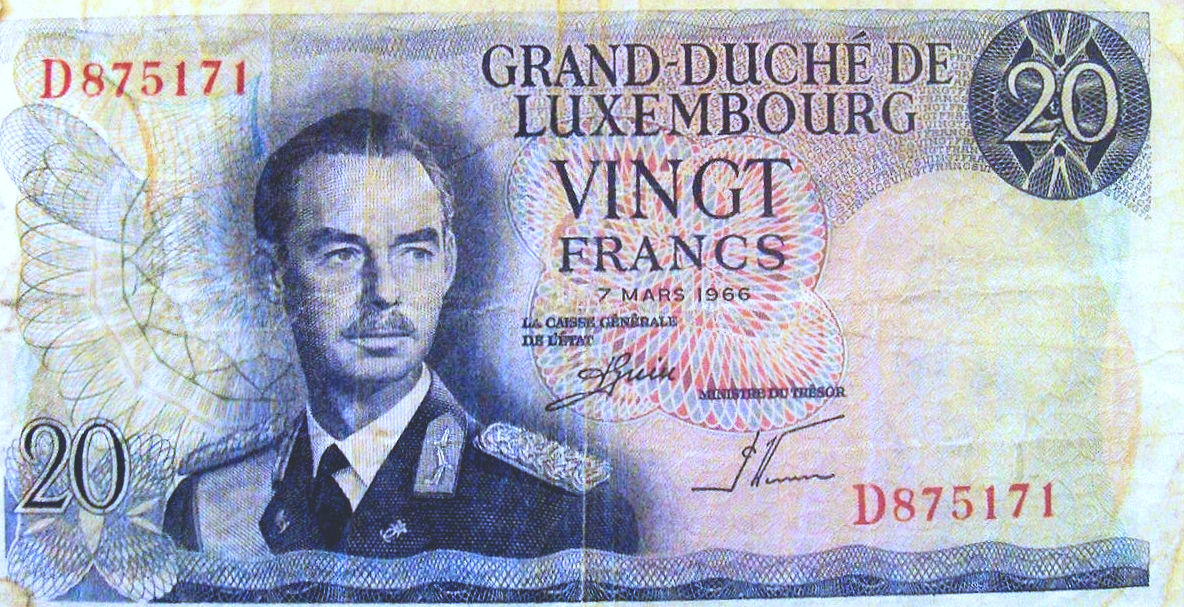
20 Luxembourg franc banknote (1966).

Before the First World War, notes were issued by the Banque Internationale à Luxembourg (BIL) and the National Bank, denominated in Thaler, Mark and, occasionally, francs, with an exchange rate of 1 franc = 80 Pfennig (the relative gold standards would have implied a rate of 1 franc = 81 Pfennig) used on bi-currency notes.

In 1914, State Treasury notes were issued. The first series was denominated in francs and Mark but these were the last Luxembourg notes to feature the German currency. Denominations were of 1, 2, 5, 25 and 125 francs (80 Pfennig, 1.6, 4, 20 and 100 Mark). In 1919, a second series of State Treasury notes was issued, with new denominations of 50 centimes and 500 francs. In 1923, the BIL issued the first of several types of 100-franc notes which continued until the 1980s. In 1932, the state introduced 50-franc notes, followed by 1000-franc notes in 1940.

In 1944, following liberation, the franc was reintroduced with a new series of notes in denominations of 5, 10, 20, 50 and 100 francs. The 5-franc notes were replaced by coins in 1949, followed by the 10-franc notes in 1971, the 20-franc notes in 1980 and the 50-franc notes in 1987.

In 1985, the Institut Monétaire Luxembourgeois took over paper money issuance from the government and issued the first post-war 1000-franc notes (€24.79). These were followed by 100-franc notes (€2.48) in 1986 and 5000-franc notes (€123.95) in 1993.

Banknotes of the Luxembourg franc, Grand Duke Jean issue (1966–2002)
Image	Value	Euro equivalent (in 1999)	Dimensions (mm)	Main colour	Description		Issue
Image	Value	Euro equivalent (in 1999)	Dimensions (mm)	Main colour	Obverse	Reverse	Issue
First series
	10 F	€0.25	124 × 66	Green	Grand Duke Jean	Grand Duchess Charlotte Bridge	1967
	20 F	€0.50	130 × 70	Blue	Grand Duke Jean	Moselle landscape near Schengen	1966
	50 F	€1.24	136 × 74	Brown	Grand Duke Jean	Workers at a steel mill	1972
	100 F	€2.48	142 × 76	Teal	Grand Duke Jean; Alcide De Gasperi building and Ville Haute	Red Lands steelworks and Niklosbierg reservoir, coat of arms of Luxembourg	1968
	100 F	€2.48	142 × 77	Red	Grand Duke Jean	Adolphe Bridge and Avenue de la Liberté	1970
Second series
	100 F	€2.48	142 × 76	Red	Grand Duke Jean; Grand Ducal Palace	Ville Haute	1980 (Note: Re-issued in 1993 with slight variations.)
	100 F	€2.48	142 × 77	Brown	Grand Duke Jean and Prince Henry; Luxembourg Cathedral, bridges of Luxembourg City	Two stylized female figures	1981
	1000 F	€24.79	154 × 76	Brown	Grand Duke Jean; Vianden Castle	Echternach; Image and writings of Saint Willibrord	1985
	5000 F	€123.95	160 × 76	Green	Grand Duke Jean; Clervaux Castle and Clervaux Abbey	European Center, Kirchberg	1993

== See also ==
- Adoption of the euro in Luxembourg
- Economy of Luxembourg
- Luxembourgish euro coins

== Notes ==
Preceded by Belgian franc	Luxembourgish currency 1854-1941	Succeeded by German Reichsmark
Preceded by German Reichsmark	Luxembourgish currency 1944-1999^{1}	Succeeded by Euro
