= Luxembourgish euro coins =

Designs of Luxembourgish currency

Luxembourgish euro coins feature three different designs, though they all contain the portrait or effigy of Grand Duke Henri of Luxembourg. The designs, by Yvette Gastauer-Claire, also contain the 12 stars of the European flag, the year of imprint and the name of the country in the Luxembourgish language: Lëtzebuerg.

The Grand Duke Henri appears on the coins facing to the left. (Note: In heraldry, directions are often described as they would appear to the bearer of a coat of arms, rather than as they would appear to the viewer. Therefore, coin descriptions will use "facing to the left" when it would appear to the layperson that the person depicted is facing to the right.) As he only became Grand Duke in 2000 following the abdication of his father, Jean, Henri was not featured on the Luxembourg franc, with the exception of a 500 francs commemorative coin minted in 7,500 copies to commemorate his accession to the throne. Jean's portrait on the francs showed him facing to the right, and it is common in a number of countries for successive monarchs to alternate the direction they faced on coins.

Having abdicated on 3 October 2025, Grand Duke Henri's effigy will be replaced by that of his successor, Guillaume V, starting on 13 July 2026. The first coin bearing his likeness was minted in his presence at the Monnaie de Paris factory in Pessac, Gironde, on 7 July 2026. Grand Duke Guillaume appears on the coins facing to the right.

== Luxembourg euro design ==
For images of the common side and a detailed description of the coins, see euro coins.

=== First series (2002–2025): Grand Duke Henri ===
Depiction of Luxembourg euro coinage | Obverse side
€ 0.01	€ 0.02	€ 0.05
Effigy of Grand Duke Henri of Luxembourg
€ 0.10	€ 0.20	€ 0.50
Effigy of Grand Duke Henri of Luxembourg
€ 1.00	€ 2.00	€ 2 Coin Edge
		for a total of 12 stars
Effigy of Grand Duke Henri of Luxembourg		for a total of 12 stars

=== Second series (2026–present): Grand Duke Guillaume ===
Depiction of Luxembourg euro coinage | Obverse side
€ 0.01	€ 0.02	€ 0.05
Effigy of Grand Duke Guillaume V of Luxembourg
€ 0.10	€ 0.20	€ 0.50
Effigy of Grand Duke Guillaume V of Luxembourg
€ 1.00	€ 2.00	€ 2 Coin Edge
		for a total of 12 stars
Effigy of Grand Duke Guillaume V of Luxembourg		for a total of 12 stars

== Circulating mintage quantities ==
Face Value	€0.01	€0.02	€0.05	€0.10	€0.20	€0.50	€1.00	€2.00
2002	34,517,500	35,917,500	28,917,500	25,117,500	25,717,000	21,917,500	21,318,525	18,517,000
2003	1,500,000	1,500,000	4,500,000	1,500,000	1,500,000	2,500,000	1,500,000	3,500,000
2004	21,001,000	20,001,000	16,001,000	12,001,000	14,001,000	10,001,000	9,001,000	7,553,200
2005	7,000,000	13,000,000	6,000,000	2,000,000	6,000,000	3,000,000	2,000,000	3,500,000
2006	4,000,000	4,000,000	5,000,000	4,000,000	7,000,000	3,000,000	1,000,000	2,000,000
2007	6,000,000	8,000,000	5,000,000	5,000,000	8,000,000	4,000,000	480,000	4,000,000
2008	10,000,000	12,000,000	9,000,000	5,000,000	6,000,000	4,000,000	480,000	6,000,000
2009	4,000,000	3,000,000	6,000,000	4,000,000	5,000,000	2,000,000	240,000	240,000
2010	6,000,000	8,000,000	6,000,000	4,000,000	8,000,000	5,000,000	1,000,000	3,500,000
2011	7,600,000	6,200,000	6,700,000	4,800,000	5,300,000	3,500,000	1,520,000	2,320,000
2012	9,200,000	7,200,000	5,200,000	2,200,000	5,200,000	2,600,000	2,240,000	3,760,000
2013	5,100,000	7,100,000	7,100,000	3,600,000	7,100,000	6,100,000	3,320,000	3,120,000
2014	10,000,000	10,000,000	10,000,000	5,000,000	7,000,000	7,000,000	5,000,000	9,000,000
2015	5,000,000	7,000,000	6,000,000	4,000,000	10,000,000	5,000,000	1,000,000	4,000,000
2016	5,000,000	7,000,000	6,000,000	4,000,000	10,000,000	5,000,000	1,000,000	4,000,000
2017	50,000	50,000	50,000	50,000	50,000	50,000	50,000	50,000
2018	5,050,000	5,050,000	3,050,000	2,050,000	50,000	50,000	50,000	50,000

=== Mints ===
2002-2004: Royal Dutch Mint (Netherlands)
2005-2006: Mint of Finland
2007-2008: Paris Mint (France)
2009-present: Royal Dutch Mint (Netherlands)

== Changes to national sides ==
The Commission of the European Communities issued a recommendation on 19 December 2008, a common guideline for the national sides and the issuance of euro coins intended for circulation. One section of this recommendation stipulates that:

Article 4. Design of the national sides:

"The national side of the euro coins intended for circulation should bear the 12 European stars that should fully surround the national design, including the year mark and the indication of the issuing Member State's name. The European stars should be depicted as on the European flag."

The first series of the Luxembourgish euro coins did not comply with this recommendation. No efforts were made to amend these coins to make them compliant. The second series were made to be in accordance with this recommendation.

== €2 commemorative coins ==
Year	Subject	Volume	Note
2007	50 years since the Treaty of Rome	2,000,000	commonly issued coin
2009	10 years of the Economic and Monetary Union of the European Union	800,000	commonly issued coin
2012	10 years of Euro Coins and Banknotes	500,000	commonly issued coin
2015	30 years of the Flag of Europe	500,000	commonly issued coin
2022	35 years of the Erasmus Programme		commonly issued coin
2024	100th anniversary of the introduction of the franc coins with the Feierstëppler		
2025	75th anniversary of the Schuman Declaration		

=== Luxembourgish Grand-Ducal Dynasty series ===
Year	Number	Design	Grand Dukes Depicted	Volume
2004	1	Effigy and Monogram of Grand Duke Henri	Grand Duke Henri	2,447,800
2005	2	50th birthday of Grand Duke Henri, 5th anniversary of his accession to the throne and 100th anniversary of the death of Grand Duke Adolphe	Grand Duke Henri and Grand Duke Adolphe	2,720,000
2006	3	25th birthday of Hereditary Grand Duke Guillaume	Grand Duke Henri and Hereditary Grand Duke Guillaume	1,000,000
2007	4	Grand Ducal Palace	Grand Duke Henri	1,000,000
2008	5	Berg Castle	Grand Duke Henri	1,000,000
2009	6	90th anniversary of Grand Duchess Charlotte's accession to the throne	Grand Duke Henri and Grand Duchess Charlotte	800,000
2010	7	Arms of the Grand Duke	Grand Duke Henri	500,000
2011	8	50th anniversary of the Appointment of Jean, Grand Duke of Luxembourg by his mother Charlotte, Grand Duchess of Luxembourg as lieutenant-représentent	Grand Duke Henri, Grand Duke Jean and Grand Duchess Charlotte	700,000
2012	9	100 years since the death of William IV, Grand Duke of Luxembourg	Grand Duke Henri and Grand Duke William IV	700,000
2012	10	Royal Wedding of Guillaume, Hereditary Grand Duke of Luxembourg to Countess Stéphanie de Lannoy	Grand Duke Henri, Hereditary Grand Duke Guillaume and Hereditary Grand Duchess Stéphanie	500,000
2013	11	National Anthem of the Grand Duchy	Grand Duke Henri	500,000
2014	12	175th anniversary of the Luxembourg's independence	Grand Duke Henri	500,000
2014	13	50th anniversary of Grand Duke Jean accession to the throne	Grand Duke Henri and Grand Duke Jean	500,000
2015	14	15th anniversary of Grand Duke Henri accession to the throne	Grand Duke Henri and Grand Duchess Maria Teresa	500,000
2015	15	125th anniversary of the Nassau-Weilburg Dynasty	Grand Duke Henri, Grand Duke Jean, Grand Duchess Charlotte, Grand Duchess Marie-Adélaïde, Grand Duke William IV and Grand Duke Adolphe	500,000
2016	16	50 years of Grand Duchess Charlotte Bridge	Grand Duke Henri	500,000
2017	17	50 years since the foundation of the current Luxembourg Army	Grand Duke Henri	300,000
2017	18	200 years since the birth of Grand Duke William III	Grand Duke Henri and Grand Duke William III	300,000
2018	19	150 years since the Constitution of Luxembourg	Grand Duke Henri	300,000
2018	20	175 years since the death of Grand Duke William I	Grand Duke Henri and Grand Duke William I	300,000
2019	21	100th anniversary of Grand Duchess Charlotte's accession to the throne	Grand Duke Henri and Grand Duchess Charlotte	
2019	22	100 years of Universal Suffrage in Luxembourg	Grand Duke Henri	
2020	23	Bicentenary of the birth of Prince Henry of Orange-Nassau	Grand Duke Henri and Prince Henry of Orange-Nassau	
2020	24	Birth of Prince Charles of Luxembourg	Hereditary Grand Duke Guillaume, Hereditary Grand Duchess Stéphanie and Prince Charles of Luxembourg	
2021	25	100 years since the birth of Grand Duke Jean	Grand Duke Henri and Grand Duke Jean	
2021	26	40 years since the wedding of Grand Duke Henri and Grand Duchess Maria Teresa	Grand Duke Henri and Grand Duchess Maria Teresa	
2022	27	50 years since the Flag of Luxembourg	Grand Duke Henri	
2022	28	10 years since the wedding of Hereditary Grand Duke Guillaume and Hereditary Grand Duchess Stéphanie	Hereditary Grand Duke Guillaume and Hereditary Grand Duchess Stéphanie	
2023	29	25th anniversary of the admission of Grand Duke Henri as a member of the International Olympic Committee	Grand Duke Henri	
2023	30	175th anniversary of the Chamber of Deputies and the First Constitution	Grand Duke Henri	
2024	31	175th anniversary of the death of Grand Duke Guillaume II	Grand Duke Henri	
2025	32	25th anniversary of Grand Duke Henri's accession to the throne	Grand Duke Henri	

== See also ==
- Adoption of the euro in Luxembourg
