= Eurosystem =

Monetary authority of the eurozone

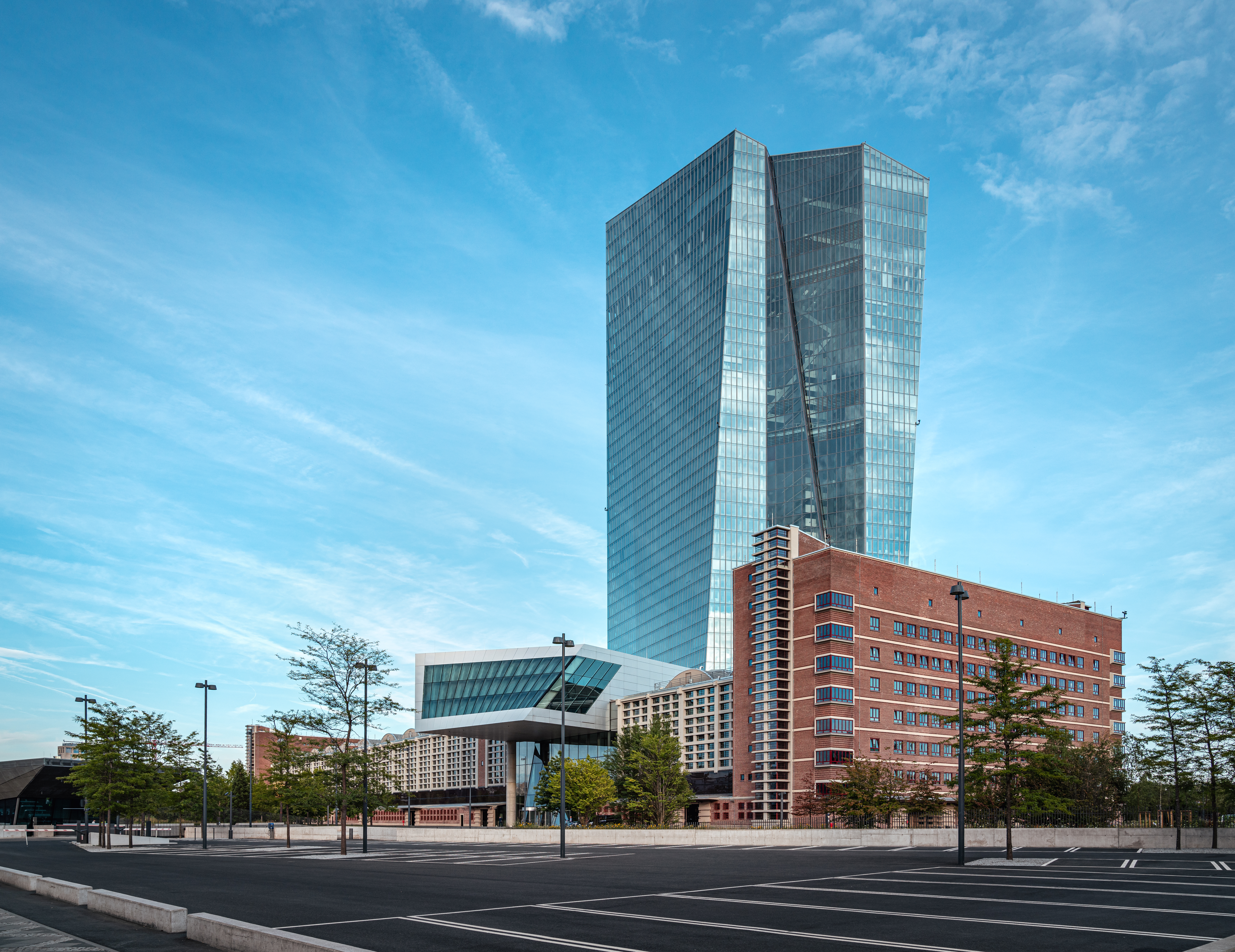
European Central Bank in Frankfurt

The Eurosystem is the monetary authority of the eurozone, the collective of European Union member states that have adopted the euro as their sole official currency. The European Central Bank (ECB) has, under Article 16 of its Statute, the exclusive right to authorise the issuance of euro banknotes. Member states can issue euro coins, but the amount must be authorised by the ECB beforehand.

The Eurosystem consists of the ECB and the national central banks (NCB) of the 21 member states that are part of the eurozone. The national central banks apply the monetary policy of the ECB. The primary objective of the Eurosystem is price stability. Secondary objectives are financial stability and financial integration. The mission statement of the Eurosystem says that the ECB and the national central banks jointly contribute to achieving the objectives.

The Eurosystem is independent. When performing Eurosystem-related tasks, neither the ECB, nor an NCB, nor any member of their decision-making bodies may seek or take instructions from any external body. The Community institutions and bodies and the governments of the member states may not seek to influence the members of the decision-making bodies of the ECB or of the NCBs in the performance of their tasks.

The Eurosystem is distinct from the European System of Central Banks (ESCB), which comprises the ECB and the central banks of all 27 European Union member states, including those that are not part of the eurozone.

== Functions ==
In accordance with the treaty establishing the European Community and the Statute of the European System of Central Banks and of the European Central Bank, the primary objective of the Eurosystem is to maintain price stability. Without prejudice to this objective, the Eurosystem supports the general economic policies in the Community and acts in accordance with the principles of an open market economy.

The basic tasks carried out by the Eurosystem are (art. 127 TFEU):

- to define and implement the common monetary policy of the eurozone
- to conduct foreign exchange operations
- to hold and manage the official foreign reserves of the euro zone Member States, and
- to promote the smooth operation of payment systems.

In addition, the Eurosystem contributes to the smooth conduct of policies pursued by the competent authorities relating to the prudential supervision of credit institutions and the stability of the financial system.

The ECB has an advisory role vis-à-vis the Community and national authorities on matters within its field of competence, particularly where Community or national legislation is concerned. The ECB, assisted by the NCBs, has the task of collecting the necessary statistical information either from the competent national authorities or directly from economic agents to enable the ESCB to perform its tasks.

== Members ==
Logo of the Deutsche Bundesbank with a reference to the Eurosystem

Eurozone members (Eurosystem)
State	Central Bank	Governor (Note: Most common name for post; also used: President, Chairman or General Secretary.)	Website
(European Union) Eurozone	European Central Bank	Christine Lagarde	https://ecb.europa.eu
Austria	Austrian National Bank	Martin Kocher	https://www.oenb.at
Belgium	National Bank of Belgium	Pierre Wunsch	http://www.nbb.be
Bulgaria	Bulgarian National Bank	Dimitar Radev	http://www.bnb.bg
Croatia	Croatian National Bank	Ante Žigman	http://www.hnb.hr
Cyprus	Central Bank of Cyprus	Christodoulos Patsalides	http://www.centralbank.cy
Estonia	Bank of Estonia	Ülo Kaasik	http://www.eestipank.ee
Finland	Bank of Finland	Olli Rehn	http://www.suomenpankki.fi
France	Bank of France	Emmanuel Moulin	http://www.banque-france.fr
Germany	Deutsche Bundesbank	Joachim Nagel	http://www.bundesbank.de
Greece	Bank of Greece	Yannis Stournaras	http://www.bankofgreece.gr
Ireland	Central Bank of Ireland	Gabriel Makhlouf	http://www.centralbank.ie
Italy	Bank of Italy	Fabio Panetta	http://www.bancaditalia.it
Latvia	Bank of Latvia	Mārtiņš Kazāks	http://www.bank.lv
Lithuania	Bank of Lithuania	Gediminas Šimkus	http://www.lb.lt
Luxembourg	Central Bank of Luxembourg	Gaston Reinesch	http://www.bcl.lu
Malta	Central Bank of Malta	Alexander Demarco	http://centralbankmalta.org
Netherlands	De Nederlandsche Bank	Olaf Sleijpen	http://www.dnb.nl
Portugal	Bank of Portugal	Álvaro Santos Pereira	http://www.bportugal.pt
Slovakia	National Bank of Slovakia	Peter Kažimír	http://www.nbs.sk
Slovenia	Bank of Slovenia	Primož Dolenc	http://www.bsi.si
Spain	Bank of Spain	José Luis Escrivá	http://www.bde.es

== Consolidated balance sheet of the Eurosystem ==
Consolidated balance sheet of the Eurosystem
Assets				Liabilities			
(EUR millions)	31 December 2024	31 December 2023	31 December 2022	(EUR millions)	31 December 2024	31 December 2023	31 December 2022
1 Gold and gold receivables (Note: Physical gold, i.e. bars, coins, plates, nuggets, in storage or ‘under way’. Non-physical gold, such as balances in gold sight accounts (unallocated accounts), term deposits and claims to receive gold arising from the following transactions: (a) upgrading or downgrading transactions; and (b) gold location or purity swaps where there is a difference of more than one business day between release and receipt.)	872,156	649,110	592,898	1 Banknotes in circulation	1,588,344	1,567,711	1,572,033
2 Claims on non-euro area residents denominated in foreign currency (Note: Claims on counterparties resident outside the euro area including international and supranational institutions and central banks outside the euro area denominated in foreign currency) ts	522,440	499,583	523,240	2 Liabilities to euro area credit institutions related to monetary policy operations denominated in euro	2,991,283	3,508,865	3,998,940
3 Claims on euro area residents denominated in foreign currency (Note: (a) Security investments inside the euro area other than those under asset item 11.3 ‘Other financial assets’ Notes and bonds, bills, zero bonds, money market paper, equity instruments held as part of the foreign reserves, all issued by euro area residents (b) Other claims on euro area residents other than those under asset item 11.3 ‘Other financial assets’ Loans, deposits, reverse repo transactions, sundry lending)	16,015	13,876	20,417	3 Other liabilities to euro area credit institutions denominated in euro	27,869	58,873	78,335
4 Claims on non-euro area residents denominated in euro (Note: (a) Balances with banks outside the euro area other than those under asset item 11.3 ‘Other financial assets’ Current accounts, fixed-term deposits, day-to-day money, reverse repo transactions in connection with the management of securities denominated in euro (b) Security investments outside the euro area other than those under asset item 11.3 ‘Other financial assets’ Equity instruments, notes and bonds, bills, zero bonds, money market paper, all issued by non-euro-area residents (c) Loans to non-euro-area residents other than those under asset item 11.3 ‘Other financial assets’ (d) Securities issued by entities outside the euro area other than those under asset item 11.3 ‘Other financial assets’ and asset item 7.1 ‘Securities held for monetary policy purposes’ Securities issued by supranational or international organisations, e.g. the European Investment Bank, irrespective of their geographical location, and not purchased for monetary policy purposes)	20,132	20,097	14,224	4 Debt certificates issued	0	0	0
5 Lending to euro area credit institutions related to monetary policy operations denominated in euro	34,221	410,290	1,324,347	5 Liabilities to other euro area residents denominated in euro	203,849	303,864	564,582
6 Other claims on euro area credit institutions denominated in euro	36,292	28,707	31,035	6 Liabilities to non-euro area residents denominated in euro	242,367	281,940	540,725
7 Securities of euro area residents denominated in euro	4,532,962	4,898,966	5,102,068	7 Liabilities to euro area residents denominated in foreign currency	11,274	16,382	11,683
8 General government debt denominated in euro	20,394	20,917	21,589	8 Liabilities to non-euro area residents denominated in foreign currency	603	4,474	4,753
9 Other assets	365,924	393,943	321,222	9 Counterpart of special drawing rights allocated by the IMF	182,810	177,116	181,121
				10 Other liabilities	218,667	260,877	290,578
				11 Revaluation accounts	872,322	635,144	588,053
				12 Capital and reserves	81,148	120,242	120,237
Total assets	6,420,536	6,935,489	7,951,039		6,420,536	6,935,489	7,951,039

== See also ==
- System of National Banks (Yugoslavia)
- T2 (RTGS), the real-time gross settlement system owned and operated by the Eurosystem.
