= Gaston Reinesch =

Luxembourgish economist

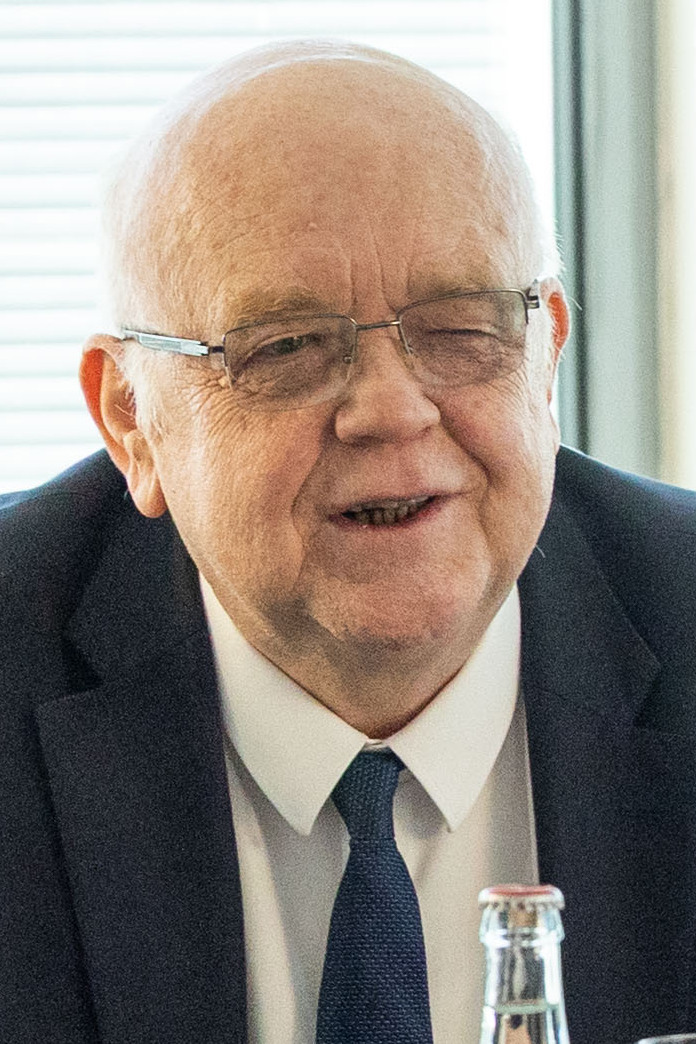
- Reinesch in 2025
- Born: 17 May 1958 (age 68); Luxembourg
- Occupation: Economist
- Years active: 1984-today

Academic background
- Education: London School of Economics

Gaston Reinesch (born 17 May 1958) is a Luxembourgish economist. He has been the governor of the Central Bank of Luxembourg since 1 January 2013, and a member of the board of governors of the European Central Bank since December 2012.

== Early life and education ==
Reinesch holds a Master of Science in Economics from the London School of Economics.

== Career ==
Reinesch started to work at the Ministry of Finance in 1989, working on fiscal and currency issues. From 1995 to 2012, he was general director at the Ministry of Finance (replacing Romain Bausch) and held, through that position, the roles of president of the board of BGL BNP Paribas (during the transition from Banque Générale du Luxembourg to BGL BNP Paribas), member of the board of European Investment Bank, president of the Société Nationale de Crédit et d'Investissement, president of the Board of Post Luxembourg.

On 15 December 2012, Reinesch joined the board of governors of the European Central Bank, and the following month, in January 2013, he took on the role of governor of the Central Bank of Luxembourg for a 6-year term. He was reappointed for a second 6-year term in 2019, and for a third one in 2024.

== Other activities ==
- European Systemic Risk Board (ESRB), Ex-Officio Member of the General Board
- International Monetary Fund (IMF), Ex-Officio Alternate Member of the Board of Governors

== Published work ==
- Le Traité de Maastricht : genèse, analyse, commentaires, E. Bruylant (contributors: Jim Cloos, Gaston Reinesch, Daniel Vignes, Joseph Weyland), 1993. Collection Organisation internationale et relations internationales.
- University of Luxembourg: Lecture notes by Gaston Reinesch, Visiting Professor, Archive uni.lu
- Essai d'Économie Politique, 2026, Version 9a Division du travail, Spécialisation, Échanges, Marchés, État, Droit et Monnaie
- The Governor's Blog aims to share, in an above all instructive manner, useful knowledge in relation to the monetary policy of the Eurosystem, of which the BCL is an integral part. Beyond that, it serves to explain more generally the BCL's European, international and national missions, and to take up positions expressed by the Governor. Finally, it will also present the work (reports, working papers, published articles, etc.) carried out within or by the BCL bcl.lu
