= Association of the Luxembourg Fund Industry =

Investment fund trade association

- Abbreviation: ALFI
- Formation: 1988
- Legal status: Non-profit organisation
- Purpose: Fund management in Luxembourg
- Location: Luxembourg
- Members: 1500 members (2022)
- Chairman: Corinne Lamesch
- Website: www.alfi.lu

The Association of the Luxembourg Fund Industry represents the financial sector of the Luxembourg government.

== Chairman of the board ==
| Pierre Vansteenkiste | 1988 to 1992 |
| Patrick Zurstrassen | 1992 to 1995 |
| Rafik Fischer | 1998 to 2001 |
| Guy Legrand | 2001 to 2003 |
| Thomas Seale | 2003 to 2007 |
| Claude Kremer | 2007 to 2011 |
| Marc Saluzzi | 2011 to 2015 |
| Denise Voss | 2015 to 2019 |
| Corinne Lamesch | from 2019 |
