= Commission de Surveillance du Secteur Financier =

Financial supervisory authority in Luxembourg

Coordinates: 49°36′57″N 6°5′56.7″E

- CSSF
- Seat of the CSSF; 283 Route d'Arlon, Luxembourg City

Agency overview
- Formed: June 1, 1998
- Jurisdiction: Government of Luxembourg
- Headquarters: Luxembourg
- Employees: 911 (1 January 2020)
- Agency executive: C. Marx, Director General
- Website: www.cssf.lu

The Commission de surveillance du secteur financier (CSSF) is the main financial supervisory authority in Luxembourg. The CSSF is responsible for the supervision of experts in the financial sector, banks, investment companies, pension funds, regulated securities markets and their operators, multilateral trading facilities and payment institutions, and is the competent authority for the public auditor oversight.

Under European Union policy frameworks, the CSSF is the national competent authority for Luxembourg within European Banking Supervision. It is a voting member of the respective Boards of Supervisors of the European Banking Authority (EBA) and European Securities and Markets Authority (ESMA). It is Luxembourg's designated National Resolution Authority and plenary session member of the Single Resolution Board (SRB). It provides the permanent single common representative for Luxembourg in the Supervisory composition of the General Board of the Anti-Money Laundering Authority (AMLA). It is also a member of the European Systemic Risk Board (ESRB).

== History ==
The CSSF took over the duties of the former Commissariat aux Bourses and of the Institut Monétaire Luxembourgeois (IML), which on 1 June 1998, became the Banque centrale du Luxembourg (BCL).

== Organization ==
Head office annex of the CSSF, 271 Route d'Arlon in Luxembourg City

Beside the Executive board, the CSSF consists of:

- Executive Board secretariat
- General secretariat
- PFS application guidance and regulation
- Legal department
- On-site inspection
- Public oversight of the audit profession
- Accounting, auditing and transparency
- UCI departments
- Supervision of specialised PFS
- Supervision of banks
- Single Supervisory Mechanism (SSM)
- Depositor and Investor Protection
- Supervision of securities markets departments
- Supervision of investment firms
- Innovation, payments, markets infrastructures and governance
- Supervision of information systems and support PFS
- Personnel, administration and finance
- Information systems of the CSSF (IT)
- Resolution

== Responsibilities ==
=== Supervision ===
The CSSF supervision of the financial sector aims at:

- Promotion of a considered and prudent business policy in accordance with regulatory requirements
- Protection of the financial stability of the regulated entities and the financial sector as a whole
- Monitoring the quality of the organizational and internal control systems
- Strengthening the quality of risk management

The CSSF monitors all financial activities in Luxembourg requiring the approval of the Minister responsible for the CSSF. It believes that it is in the public interest to ensure (a) that the laws and ordinances are enforced on the financial sector and (b) that international conventions and EU directives in the areas under its responsibility are implemented. The CSSF is authorized to demand all information needed to perform its duties from the companies under its supervision. The CSSF takes care of negotiations about the financial sector and coordinates the implementation of government measures whenever there is an expansion of the activities of the financial sector at local or international level.

=== Public auditor oversight ===
The CSSF is the public auditor oversight. In this regard, the CSSF is thus responsible for the granting of the professional qualifications of the "Independent Auditor" (auditors) and "cabinet de Revision" (audit) for the approval and registration of statutory auditors and audit firms. The CSSF is also responsible for the implementation of auditing standards and professional ethical standards and internal quality control of audit firms and approvals for continuing education.

=== Investor protection ===
The CSSF is directly responsible for investor protection related queries. As part of the FIN-NET program, the CSSF is the sole recourse for investors who seek compensation or handling of complaints. Unlike some jurisdictions, there is no separate or independent ombudsman. There have been a number of high-profile cases, including Madoff, where the CSSF's ability to handle customer complaints has come into question. To date, the general response has been unsatisfactory and there are increasing concerns over the capabilities of the CSSF to carry out their duties effectively. With a prime role to market the financial sector, a direct conflict is often observed between protecting investors and regulating/promoting an orderly financial market. LuxAlpha (Madoff), Landsbanki, and others have failed to recover any investor monies, despite investor outcry and complaints. In the matter of LFP I SICAV, the directors, through specialist financial investigation firm Intel Suisse, launched a gross negligence civil complaint against the CSSF in October 2020, holding them responsible for €100 million of losses in 4 sub-funds identified as Ponzi schemes.

=== Anti-Money Laundering and Countering the Financing of Terrorism (AML/CTF) ===
Within the framework of its statutory mission, the CSSF is in charge of ensuring that all the persons subject to its supervision, authorization, or registration comply with the professional AML/CTF obligations. However, recent disclosure about Director General Claude Marx being cited in the Panama Papers as having a key involvement in over 100 offshore companies whilst at HSBC Private Bank, as well as the CSSF's poor track record in addressing AML complaints, have served to undermine its credibility as an AML enforcer.

== See also ==
- Central Bank of Luxembourg
- List of financial supervisory authorities by country
