= Central Bank of Luxembourg =

Central Bank of Luxembourg Banque centrale du Luxembourg (in French)

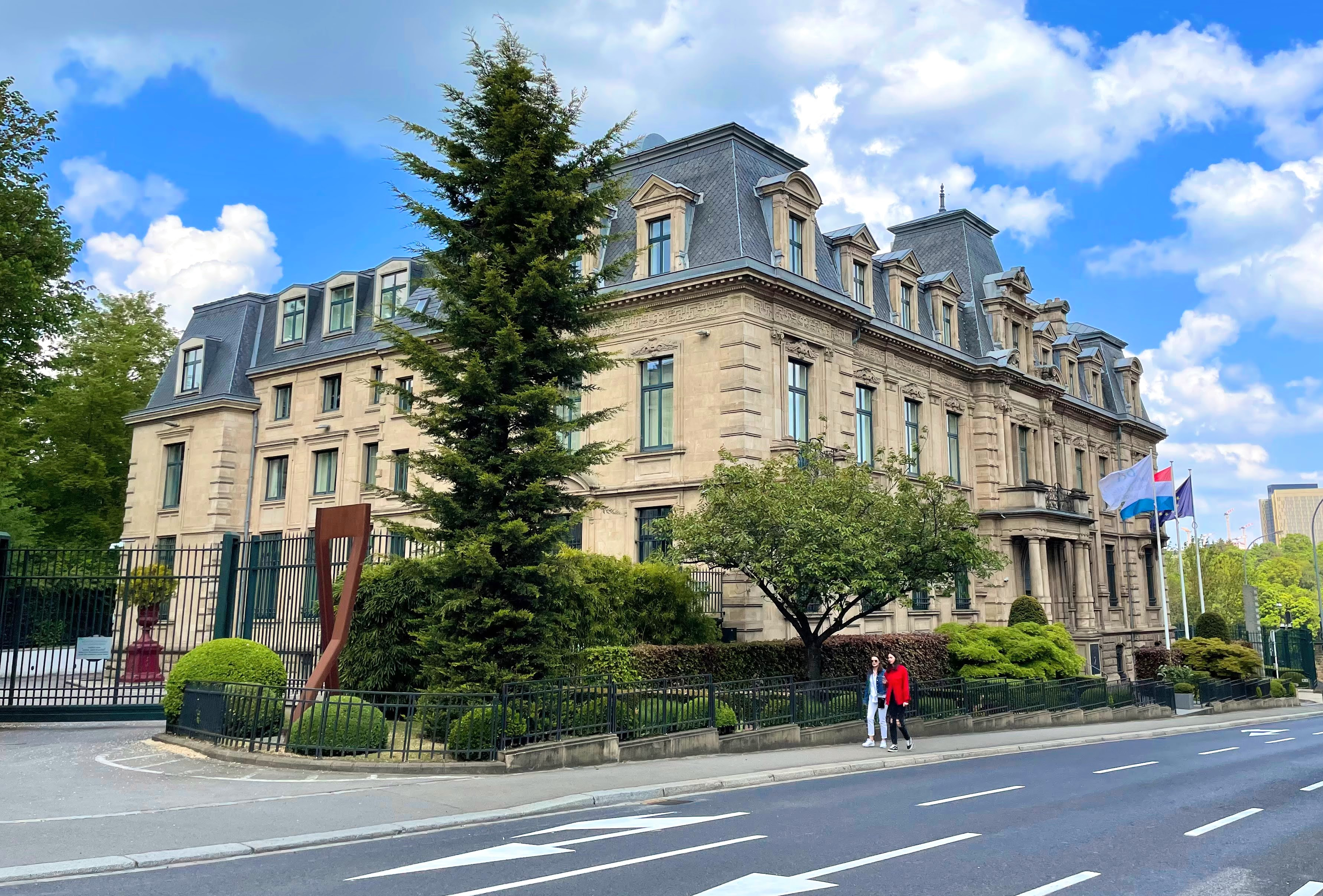
- Central bank of: Luxembourg
- Headquarters: Boulevard Royal, Luxembourg City
- Established: 1 June 1998
- Ownership: 100% state ownership
- Governor: Gaston Reinesch
- Reserves: 190 million USD
- Preceded by: Institut Monétaire Luxembourgeois (IML)
- Succeeded by: European Central Bank (1999)^{1}
- Website: www.bcl.lu
- ^{1} The Central Bank of Luxembourg still exists but many functions have been taken over by the ECB.

The Central Bank of Luxembourg (French: Banque centrale du Luxembourg [bɑ̃k sɑ̃tʁal dy lyksɑ̃buʁ], BCL; German: Luxemburger Zentralbank [ˈlʊksm̩ˌbʊʁɡɐ tsɛnˈtʁaːlbaŋk]; Luxembourgish: Zentralbank vu Lëtzebuerg) is the national central bank for Luxembourg within the Eurosystem. It was founded for that purpose in 1998, and also succeeded the Institut Monétaire Luxembourgeois in some of the latter's mandates. For a few months in 1998, it was the issuer of the Luxembourg franc currency.

The Central Bank of Luxembourg is not itself a financial supervisory authority but participates in European banking supervision as a member of the Supervisory Board of the European Central Bank, alongside the Commission de Surveillance du Secteur Financier. It is also a member of the European Systemic Risk Board (ESRB).

== Former IML Management ==
- Pierre Jaans (Director General of IML 1983–1998)
- Raymond Kirsch (President of IML 1985–1998)

== Governors BCL ==
- Yves Mersch (1998–2013)
- Gaston Reinesch (since 2013)

== See also ==
- List of banks in Luxembourg
- Economy of Luxembourg
- Luxembourgish franc
- List of central banks
