= Delors Committee =

Committee that paved the way for the creation of the euro

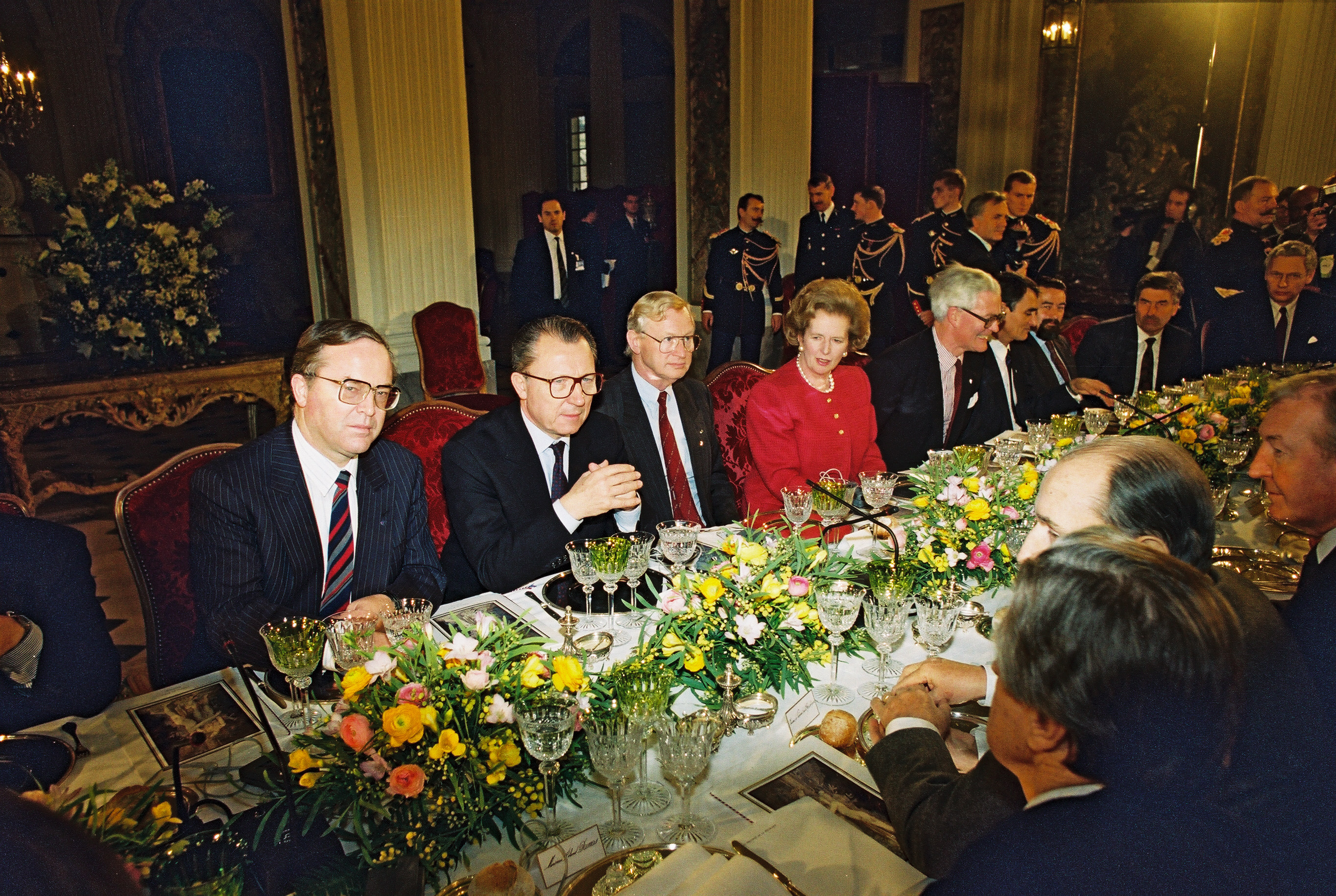
Jacques Delors (second from left) at the European Council in Strasbourg, December 1989

The Delors Committee, formally known as the Committee for the Study of Economic and Monetary Union, was an ad hoc committee chaired by European Commission President Jacques Delors in 1988–1989. It was set up in June 1988 upon a mandate from the European Council to examine and propose concrete stages leading to European Economic and Monetary Union; its report, commonly known as the Delors Report, was published in April 1989.

The Delors Committee is widely viewed as having been the effective starting point of the process of European Economic and Monetary Union that led to the negotiation of the Treaty of Maastricht in December 1991 and adoption of the euro as the single currency of 11 of the 15 member states of the European Union on 1 January 1999.

== Background ==
The immediate context for the Delors Committee was the international monetary instability that followed the Louvre Accord of February 1987, punctuated by the so-called Basel-Nyborg Agreement on the European Monetary System (EMS) in September 1987 and the Wall Street Black Monday on 19 October 1987. In January 1988, French finance minister Édouard Balladur circulated a memorandum calling for a European common currency to address the EMS's shortcomings, followed in February by another text from Italian treasury minister Giuliano Amato that called for greater firepower of the European Monetary Cooperation Fund. In response, German foreign minister Hans-Dietrich Genscher published a memorandum of his own on 26 February 1988, seizing the initiative from his more conservative colleague finance minister Gerhard Stoltenberg and advocating a European Central Bank modeled on the Deutsche Bundesbank, whose technical design would be defined by a "committee of wise men".

Delors leveraged this environment and in late March 1988 managed to convince German chancellor Helmut Kohl, who at that time held the half-yearly rotating presidency of the Council of the European Community, to set up a committee along the lines suggested by Genscher and to directly involve central bank governors in the process. The re-election of French president François Mitterrand in May 1988 further favored a new initiative, on which aides of Delors and Kohl started to work together immediately afterwards. Kohl and Mitterrand cemented an agreement on the process at a French-German summit in Évian-les-Bains on 2 June 1988.

It was thus Delors's idea that the committee should be principally composed of the EU countries' central bank governors, who were both technically most directly in charge and potentially the most opposed to currency unification, since that would make them lose their distinctive national monetary authority. The proposal was formally made and endorsed at the European Council meeting in Hanover on 27-28 June. Bundesbank president Karl Otto Pöhl initially viewed the fact that the committee chair would be a politician rather than a central banker as unacceptable, but he was eventually persuaded by fellow central banker Wim Duisenberg to participate nevertheless.

== Composition ==
Aside from its eponymous chairman Jacques Delors, the Committee consisted of the following members (in alphabetical order as listed in Annex II of the report itself):

- Frans Andriessen, Vice President of the European Commission
- Miguel Boyer, Spanish economist and President of Banco Exterior de España
- Demetrius Chalikias, Governor of the Bank of Greece
- Carlo Azeglio Ciampi, Governor of the Bank of Italy
- Maurice F. Doyle, Governor of the Central Bank of Ireland
- Wim Duisenberg, Governor of De Nederlandsche Bank
- Jean Godeaux, Governor of the National Bank of Belgium
- Erik Hoffmeyer, Governor of Danmarks Nationalbank
- Pierre Jaans, General Manager of the Institut Monétaire Luxembourgeois
- Alexandre Lamfalussy, General Manager of the Bank for International Settlements (BIS)
- Jacques de Larosière, Governor of the Bank of France
- Robert Leigh-Pemberton, Governor of the Bank of England
- Karl Otto Pöhl, Governor of the Deutsche Bundesbank
- Mariano Rubio, Governor of the Bank of Spain
- José Alberto Tavares Moreira, Governor of the Banco de Portugal
- Niels Thygesen, professor of economics at University of Copenhagen

The committee's rapporteurs were Gunter Baer, a BIS official who had worked at the German finance ministry and the International Monetary Fund, and Tommaso Padoa-Schioppa, at the time a senior European Commission official. The committee's meetings were usually held in Basel, on the side of the monthly meetings of central bank governors at the Bank for International Settlements.

== Report ==
The committee's report was titled "Report on economic and monetary union in the European Community". It outlined a three-stage plan for the establishment of the Economic and Monetary Union, including the evolution of the existing Committee of Governors into the European Monetary Institute and ultimately the European Central Bank. The report was endorsed by the European Council in Madrid in June 1989. It was nevertheless viewed as controversial, not least in the United Kingdom.

Following the Madrid meeting, a working group chaired by Élisabeth Guigou with Padoa-Schioppa as Vice Chair, known as the Guigou Group, prepared the ground for the opening of an Intergovernmental Conference by the European Council meeting in Strasbourg in December 1989.

== Assessment and legacy ==
Viewed in retrospect, the Delors Committee was spectacularly successful, aided in its task by the fall of the Berlin Wall a few months after the delivery of its final report. According to Lamfalussy, the success owes to Delors's "genius" in persuading leaders, and especially Helmut Kohl, of the indispensable nature of monetary union to ensure the viability of the European single market, which allowed him to overcome the resistance of national central banks and especially of the Bundesbank.

Also with hindsight, the Delors Report placed insufficient emphasis on matters of financial stability and bank supervision. According to Larosière, these had been viewed as too divisive for the committee's consensus-driven approach. This was however corrected in the Maastricht Treaty with an enabling clause that became the basis two decades later for European Banking Supervision, with a decision of principle in mid-2012 and implementation in November 2014. There also remained an imbalance between a complete monetary union and a much less complete economic union in the implementation of EMU.

The full archive of the Delors Committee is held at the European Central Bank.

== See also ==
- Werner Plan
- Spaak method
