= EMCF =

EMCF is a four-letter acronym that may refer to:

- Edna McConnell Clark Foundation
- European Monetary Cooperation Fund
- European Multilateral Clearing Facility N.V.
