= Werner Plan =

The Werner Plan (or Werner Report) was drawn up by a working group chaired by Pierre Werner, Luxembourg's Prime Minister and Minister for Finances, and presented in October 1970. It was conducted after the European Summit in The Hague in 1969, where the Heads of State and Government of the European Community agreed to prepare a plan for economic and monetary union.

The three stage plan proposed gradual, institutional reform leading to the irrevocable fixing of exchange rates and the adoption of a single currency within a decade, but it did not recommend the establishment of a central bank. The plan was never implemented because of pressure of the United States (France retired its support after a France-US meeting in the Azores at the end of 1971).

There are several references to "the transfer of responsibility from the national authorities to Community authorities".

== Origins ==
In January 1968, at a congress of the German Christian Democratic Union (CDU), Werner presented a five-point plan outlining how economic and monetary union could be achieved in Europe. The proposal generated considerable interest. In September 1968, he repeated his presentation before the finance ministers of the European Economic Community, and again in December 1969 at the Hague Summit of Heads of State and Government.

Following this summit, the European Community leaders established a working group in March 1970, with Werner as its chairman, tasked with developing a concrete plan for achieving economic and monetary union in stages.

== The Plan's Structure ==
The report produced by Werner's group, subsequently known as the Werner Plan, established several fundamental principles. It described how to create a single European currency through three stages. The main goal was that all European Community countries would either lock their exchange rates permanently or replace their national currencies with one common currency. Under this system, decisions about money supply and monetary policy would be made at the European level rather than by individual countries. Europe would also speak with one voice on international monetary matters.

The first stage ran from June 1971 to December 1973. During this period, countries would begin coordinating their economic policies and keeping their currencies more stable against each other. The second stage required stronger commitments. In 1973, the European Monetary Cooperation Fund was created to help maintain stable exchange rates by intervening in currency markets when needed. The third and final stage would complete the process by permanently fixing exchange rates and introducing the single currency.

== Collapse ==
Although the Werner Plan was well received initially, its implementation was derailed by the deteriorating international monetary environment. The collapse of the Bretton Woods system in 1971 and the oil crisis of 1973 severely impacted the European economy, causing the plan to remain unrealized. Of the plan's initiatives, only the European exchange rate mechanism known as the "currency snake" survived these turbulent conditions. However, participation in this arrangement gradually diminished as several member states were forced to withdraw when their currencies depreciated too rapidly to maintain stable exchange rates. By the end of the 1970s, only West Germany, the Netherlands, Belgium, Luxembourg, and Denmark remained in the system.

== Legacy and Path to the Euro ==
The idea of a European economic and monetary union gained renewed momentum only in the 1980s, ultimately leading to the adoption of the euro in 1999. In 1978, countries created the European Monetary System with a new unit called the ECU. French President Valéry Giscard d'Estaing championed this system as a way to reduce dependence on the US dollar. The ECU was not a real currency that people could use, but it prepared the way for the euro.

In 1979, the European Monetary System represented an intermediate step toward monetary cooperation. The Werner Plan had its greatest impact in 1989 when Jacques Delors presented a new report that borrowed heavily from Werner's three-stage approach. This time, conditions were better since the markets were opening up, and German Chancellor Helmut Kohl and French President François Mitterrand worked closely together. This led to the Maastricht Treaty in 1992, which created the European Central Bank in 1998 and launched the euro in 1999. Even though the original Werner Plan was never fully implemented, it provided the blueprint for creating the euro and remains an important guide for European monetary cooperation.

== See also ==
- Bretton Woods
- Delors Committee
- Maastricht Treaty
