= European Lifelong Learning Indicators =

The development of the European Lifelong Learning Indicators (ELLI) is an initiative of the non-profit Bertelsmann Stiftung to monitor the state of lifelong learning in Europe. The main focus of the ELLI project is the ELLI Index. The ELLI index is an annually updated composite indicator summarizing the state of lifelong learning for European countries. The ELLI IT platform is an online portal that provides access to regional data related to learning and socio-economic outcomes in Europe.

== Index ==
=== Description ===
The ELLI Index is an annual measure of lifelong learning at national and sub-national levels in Europe. The ELLI Index is a composite index created from several other variables. The variables used to create the ELLI Index describe the different learning environments of school, community, work and home life. The variables cover the range of ages from birth to post-retirement. The ELLI Index measures learning in four different domains taken from the UNESCO framework developed by Jacques Delors that include learning to know, learning to do, learning to live together and learning to be.

=== Conceptual framework: UNESCO dimensions of learning ===
The ELLI project references the conceptual framework developed by UNESCO's International Commission on Education for the Twenty-first Century under the leadership of Jacques Delors. Its report identifies four pillars of lifelong learning: "learning to know", "learning to do", "learning to live together" and "learning to be".

The conceptual framework of ELLI is a revised version of the UNESCO framework. The revisions are based on changes that reflect the European context and European policy environment and have been adapted according to existing data. The operationalization of the dimensions defined by UNESCO using data sources was developed by the Canadian Council on Learning for the Canadian Composite Learning Index (CLI).

==== Learning to know – the formal education system ====
The dimension of learning to know predominantly assesses the learning of young people within the formal education system. By including data on the formal system, ELLI measures the input and outcomes of the area in which most ministries of education allocate the majority of their budget and on which policy decision-making and policy directions currently place their emphasis. In terms of investment, this dimension contains indicators on total expenditure on education and training. The range of learning opportunities for formal education that are included in ELLI are pre-school, school, higher education and adult education institutions. This pillar also measures learning outcomes from traditional core disciplines such as math, science and reading in secondary schools, as well as completion and attainment rates for post-secondary education. The learning to know pillar covers the majority of the political priorities related to education as stated by European member states.

==== Learning to do – vocational learning ====
This dimension measures the participation rates, learning opportunities and investment (by employers, government and individuals) in job-related skills. These skills can improve economic performance and social inclusion through increasing job prospects and career opportunities for the individual and improve competitiveness of the enterprise, region or country. This dimension predominantly measures adults’ continual professional development at their place of work through formal, non-formal and informal learning opportunities. It also measures students’ participation in the vocational track of the formal education system which, depending on the country/region, can also include young people within compulsory education. The variables used to construct this dimension predominantly reflect investment in learning by employers, government and individuals.

==== Learning to live together – learning for social cohesion ====
This dimension measures individual-level attitudes and dispositions that promote social cohesion such as trust, intercultural competence and political and community engagement. Learning and education has long been considered more than an issue of creating skills for employability and has been part of a social policy tool to sustain democracy, create social mobility and increase levels of health and social inclusion. This dimension tries to capture the learning of the values of democracy, tolerance and trust and the skills and interest to be able to engage other people. Learning to live together starts at home, with learning from parents and siblings, and continues through interactions at school and work and through involvement in civil society organizations. In most European countries there is a specific curriculum subject on citizenship through which many of these competences are developed; however, research has indicated that it is the level of democracy at school that is the key driver for developing these competences. The investment of individuals, families, communities and countries is often much more hidden for the learning to live together dimension as there are fewer exams and qualifications in this field compared to traditional subject-based disciplines.

==== Learning to be – learning as personal growth ====
This dimension predominantly measures self-directed learning and individuals’ efforts and investment in learning. This learning is facilitated by government provision and information provided on learning opportunities, but these provisions are considerably less than the provisions for compulsory formal education. This dimension captures informal and implicit learning that happens through engagement and participation in the home and through community and cultural activities. The implicit learning measures include activities undertaken in which the individual does not set out with a learning objective in mind and for which there is no certification of learning achievements from participation. Nevertheless, learning is often highly successful through this style of learning because participation is usually motivated by personal interest. Learning in the home often makes use of the internet, incidental access to information, virtual communities and virtual relationships. In addition to implicit learning, there is one indicator in this dimension on explicit participation in lifelong learning. This indicator, which could potentially fit in all dimensions, is placed here because individuals participate in learning for many reasons. Ultimately, participation in lifelong learning is largely voluntary, which means that those who choose to engage in it are more likely to be motivated by the interests of personal growth and development, which is the focus of this dimension.

=== Purpose ===
ELLI is a heuristic for understanding lifelong learning across Europe. In this context, lifelong learning is understood as a continual process of personal and social development and is understood to reflect not only the benefits that employability and a competitive economy offer but also the individual and social benefits of health, happiness and citizen empowerment. According to this perspective, the objectives of learning need to reflect a holistic understanding of the individual and combine a variety of knowledge, skills, values and attitudes. From this perspective, the aim of learning is to enhance the qualities of self-esteem, resilience and a positive attitude towards learning and to develop critical thinking and the ability to learn new things. The ELLI index is the first composite index used to describe lifelong learning in Europe.

=== Uses and limitations ===
The ELLI Index can be used to understand how a country or region is performing in relation to others in the field of lifelong learning. The ELLI Index should be interpreted as the a summary of the context and outcomes of lifelong learning as they relate to the social and economic well-being of regions.

The ELLI Index does not provide an in-depth evaluation of a country or region's policy and performance on lifelong learning. The assumptions used in the creation of the ELLI Index may not be an appropriate basis for comparison for all contexts. When the results are taken out of their specific context there is the risk that they may be oversimplified or misused to make biased or partisan specific policy claims. The ELLI Index is a starting point for analysis; specific research questions may be more appropriately addressed with more specific data.

=== Methodology ===
The ELLI Index is created using a statistical algorithm to combine data provided by statistical agencies and commercial providers into five values for each region with sufficient data. This method uses a combination of principal components analysis and linear regression to produce the values for the sub-indices representing the separate learning dimensions. The values for the four learning dimensions are combined to produce the overall ELLI index using inverse-variance weighting. This methodology was developed for the CLI and subsequently validated by an independent review and sensitivity analysis

=== ELLI Index Europe 2010 – results ===
The overall ELLI Index results show that the Nordic countries Denmark, Sweden and Finland and, in addition, the Netherlands rank highest. Particularly Denmark and Sweden have been the most successful countries in Europe at implementing the idea of lifelong and lifewide learning.

The top performers are followed by a group of countries that consist of mainly Central European and Anglo-Saxon countries. The next group of countries, which are below the EU average, are from Southern and Eastern Europe and range from the Czech Republic to Poland. The lowest performing group of countries is also in Southern and Eastern Europe, including Hungary, Greece, Bulgaria and Romania. However, there are many exceptions to these general patterns. Slovenia, a former communist country and new member of the European Union, performs well, scoring above the EU average and on par with Germany.

Further details are documented in: Bertelsmann Stiftung, The ELLI Index 2010, Making Lifelong Learning Tangible.

== IT platform ==
The ELLI IT platform provides access to regional data related to learning and socio-economic outcomes in Europe. The platform is a web application interface to a geodatabase. Currently the regional units in the database are the 27 member states of the European Union and subnational administrative units (NUTS levels defined by Eurostat.) In the current stage the values for subnational administrative units are only available for Germany. The data populating the databased are provided by Eurostat, regional governments and private data providers.

The ELLI IT platform has basic database application functions of querying and updating. Users may add new data for existing geographic entities but may not create new geographic entities. All queries and updates to the database are managed by the user interface of the ELLI IT platform.

Users are provided with tools like scorecards, charting, Google motion charts and mapping that may be used to visualize and communicate the data for a specific region in the platform. All of the data provided by the ELLI IT platform may be displayed on a customizable map.

== Report on learning ==
Learning takes place on the regional level. Local authorities want to know and manage lifelong learning on the regional level. Therefore, the Bertelsmann Stiftung is developing an ELLI-learning report, which allows to display indicators of learning. The selected indicators are selected according to their importance for steering and monitoring resources for learning and monitoring the results of learning. The ELLI Report on learning is developed in cooperation with the SOFI, Göttingen.

== Response ==
Despite representing a small part of the ELLI project, the majority of the media response has been to the ELLI Index. Coverage in media has included national news magazines in several countries in Europe and in Canada. The ELLI project has also produced a book, Warum Lernen glücklich macht, which has been featured in German regional news. Additionally, The ELLI project has received support from many public political and academic figures, including Gerhardt Stahl and Andreas Schleicher.
