= José Alberto Tavares Moreira =

Portuguese economist (1944 – 2020)

José Alberto de Vasconcelos Tavares Moreira GOC (10 October 1944 – 8 June 2020) was a Portuguese economist who served as governor of the Bank of Portugal (1986–1992).

== Biography ==
Tavares Moreira was born in Póvoa de Varzim, Póvoa de Varzim, Portugal, on 10 October 1944, from a family of seven brothers and sisters, being the second oldest. He graduated in Economics at the Faculty of Economics of the University of Porto. He worked as an economist, and later director and member of the Management Board of Banco Pinto & Sotto Mayor, between 1973 and 1976. Between 1979 and 1981 he was director of CGD. In the political field, he made his debut as Secretary of the Treasury between 1980 and 1981, and as Deputy Secretary of State to the Minister of Finance from 1985 to 1986.

Having resigned from all positions he held at the Bank of Portugal following a disagreement with Vítor Constâncio, he was consultant to the Board of Banco BAI Europa SA. Also, he was on the advisory board of OMFIF where he was involved in meetings regarding the financial and monetary system.

He died from cancer on 8 June 2020.

== See also ==
- Delors Committee
