= Mário Centeno =

Portuguese economist, politician and banker (born 1966)

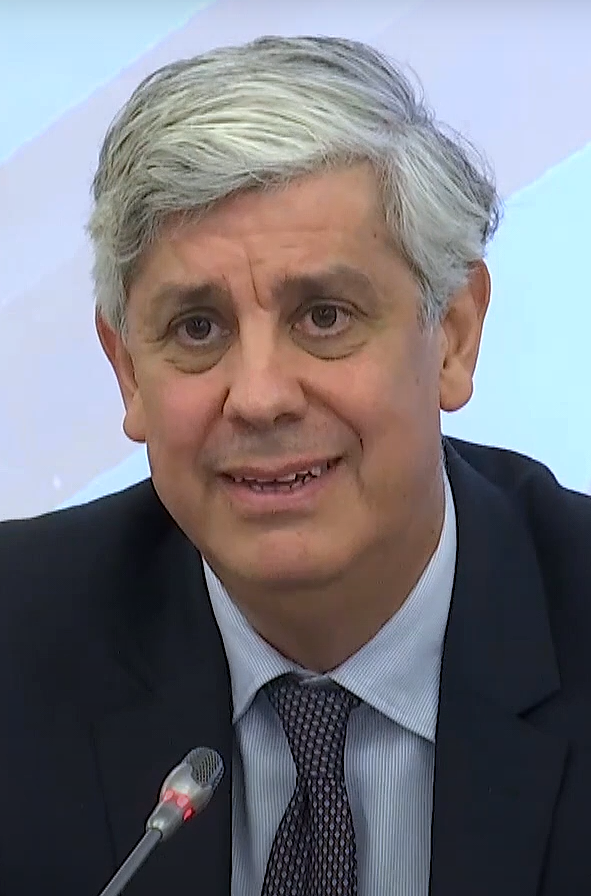
- Centeno in 2024

Governor of the Bank of Portugal
- In office 20 July 2020 – 6 October 2025
- Preceded by: Carlos Costa
- Succeeded by: Álvaro Santos Pereira

President of the Eurogroup
- In office 13 January 2018 – 13 July 2020
- Preceded by: Jeroen Dijsselbloem
- Succeeded by: Paschal Donohoe

Minister of Finance
- In office 26 November 2015 – 15 June 2020
- Prime Minister: António Costa
- Preceded by: Maria Luís Albuquerque
- Succeeded by: João Leão

Member of the Assembly of the Republic
- In office 23 October 2015 – 25 October 2019
- Constituency: Lisbon

Personal details
- Born: Mário José Gomes de Freitas Centeno; 9 December 1966 (age 59) Olhão, Portugal
- Party: Independent
- Other political affiliations: Socialist Party (associated with since 2015)
- Spouse: Maria Margarida Morgado (died 2022)
- Children: 3
- Education: University of Lisbon; Harvard University
- Occupation: Economist • Professor • Politician

Mário José Gomes de Freitas Centeno (born 9 December 1966) is a Portuguese economist, university professor, and politician. From 2015 to 2020, he was Minister of Finance of Portugal in the government cabinet of Prime Minister António Costa of the Portuguese Socialist Party (PS). He was the president of the Eurogroup and chairman of the board of Governors of the European Stability Mechanism from 2018 to 2020. Previously, he was a board member economist of the Bank of Portugal. On 9 June 2020, he announced his resignation from the Ministry of Finance, effective 15 June. On 16 July 2020, the Council of Ministers approved Centeno's nomination for the post of Governor of the Bank of Portugal, put forward by his successor as Finance minister, João Leão. Centeno is the author or co-author of several scientific publications, books and book chapters related to his areas of interest, such as labour economics, econometrics, microeconomics and contract theory.

== Early life and education ==
Mário Centeno, a native from Algarve region in southern mainland Portugal, was born in Olhão but was raised until his 15th anniversary in Vila Real de Santo António, also in Algarve, when he moved to Lisbon in order to study with the aim of entering university there.

His grandfather, Joaquim Gomes, worked as a miner in São Domingos Mine before becoming a successful restaurant owner, starting in 1936, in Vila Real de Santo António. Centeno's mother was a CTT post office chief and his father was a bank branch manager.

He studied economics at University of Lisbon, faculty of Economics and Business Management (ISEG-ULISBOA), graduating in 1990. He earned a master's degree in applied mathematics from ISEG-ULISBOA in 1993, a master's degree in economics from Harvard University that he completed in 1998, and he was awarded a PhD in economics by Harvard University in 2000. Lawrence Katz was his adviser.

== Early career ==
An expert on labour market issues, Centeno joined the Banco de Portugal (Central Bank of Portugal) in 2000, where he worked as an economist until 2004. He was member of the Executive Committee of European Association of Labor Economists (EALE) from 2003 to 2005. From 2004 to 2013 he was assistant director of the Central Bank Economics’ Department. He was member of the Economic Policy Committee of the European Commission between 2004 and 2013. He also directed the Macroeconomics Statistics Development's work group in the Superior Statistics Council (CSE) between 2007 and 2013.

From 2014, Centeno was Professor at ISEG, University of Lisbon, and worked as a consultant to the Central Bank of Portugal. In addition, he served as the main economic policy advisor to Socialist leader António Costa, coordinating the Socialist economic programme before the 2015 legislative elections.

== Minister of Finance ==
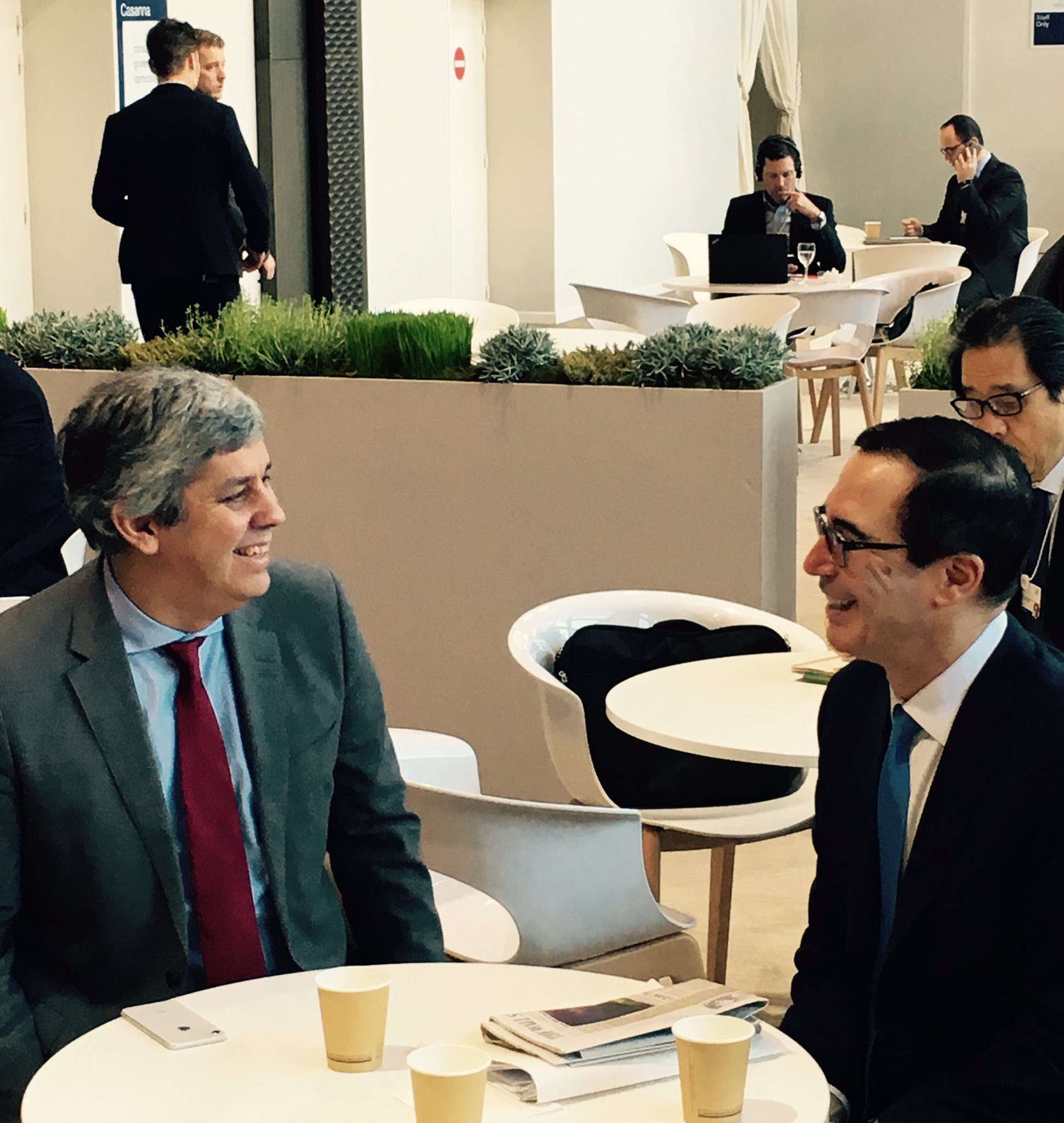
Centeno, as finance minister, meeting with the US treasury secretary Steven Mnuchin in 2018.

After taking office as Finance Minister in 2015, Centeno enacted policies which reversed some austerity policies from the Portuguese government-debt crisis (2010–2014). The new post-crisis situation allowed him to authorize a public pensions' rise and improved wage payment to civil servants as a way to "increase households’ disposable income", while insisting that European Union's budget rules must be respected. Early in his tenure, he urged the EU to acknowledge the scale of Portugal's economic turnround as the country headed towards its lowest fiscal deficit in more than 40 years and to remove Portugal from the group of countries subject to penalties for breaking the European Fiscal Compact. By the end of 2017, national opinion polls placed Centeno as the best-known and best-liked minister.

In November 2017, Centeno submitted his formal application for succeeding Jeroen Dijsselbloem as the next chairman of the Eurogroup. On 4 December 2017, he was elected President of the Eurogroup, incumbent from 13 January 2018. Reportedly favored by an informal agreement between French President Emmanuel Macron and German Chancellor Angela Merkel, he defeated Pierre Gramegna of Luxembourg, Peter Kažimír of Slovakia and Dana Reizniece-Ozola of Latvia. His election carried particular symbolic weight because he is from one of the countries hardest hit by the debt crisis. He would serve a 2 1/2-year term, which is renewable. On 21 December 2017, he was appointed as chairman of the board of Governors of the European Stability Mechanism, effective from 13 January 2018.

In early 2018, Centeno was being investigated for allegedly accepting S.L. Benfica tickets in exchange for a favourable tax treatment for a real-estate company owned by the son of Benfica president Luís Filipe Vieira. On 26 January 2018, Centeno's office was searched by the Portuguese police. On 1 February, prosecutors dropped the investigation, concluding there was "no crime of favoritism or any other (crime)" and that it has archived the case.

Following the resignation of Christine Lagarde as managing director of the International Monetary Fund (IMF) in 2019, Centeno was one of the candidates considered by European governments as potential successor; he withdrew his candidacy shortly after and the post went to Kristalina Georgieva instead.

Completely unknown to the public at the time he entered government as minister, Centeno had a reputation for economic liberalism in international academic circles because of his positions and research work in favour of greater labor market flexibility. However, during is tenure as Portuguese minister of finance (2015-2020), decades-long rigidity and inefficiency issues of the Portuguese labor market remained an unresolved problem hampering the Portuguese economy while the deepening of economic liberal policies in accordance with his positions and academic theories weren't put in place in a country persistently criticized by institutions and organizations like the OECD, the IMF and the European Union for its anti-market, labor movement-inspired labor laws and rules which promote overstaffing and the misallocation of factors of production in general.

In early 2020, the Parliament of Portugal followed Centeno's proposal and approved the country's first budget with a surplus in almost half a century in spite of the number of civil servants has increased for a sixth straight year. But an increasing deterioration of public services including in health, education and transportation infrastructure due to a lack of funding and government spending was perceptible while the country continued to fall behind in purchasing power and productivity in the context of the European Union, a feature that was associated with the persistent misallocation of capital, labor and skills. During Centeno's tenure as minister a record high tax burden was reached in Portugal.

By 2021, Portugal's GDP (PPP) was $36,381 per capita, according to OECD's report. It was the 4th lowest GDP per capita (PPP) of the eurozone out of 19 members, and the 8th lowest of the European Union out of 27 member-states, with several former economically disadvantaged Communist Bloc countries which in the meanwhile had become Eastern European member-states of the EU, nearly reaching or surpassing Portugal in terms of GDP (PPP) per capita around this date.

In 2021, labour productivity was the fifth lowest among the 27 member-states of the European Union (EU) and was 35% lower than the EU average. By 2022, the Portuguese productivity of labour (PPP) had fallen to the fourth lowest position among the 27 member-states of the European Union with only Bulgaria and Greece being clearly inferior to Portugal in that parameter.

== Later career ==
In June 2020, Prime Minister Costa's government nominated Centeno as the next governor of the Bank of Portugal, succeeding Carlos da Silva Costa.

In January 2026, the government of Prime Minister Luís Montenegro submitted Centeno as a candidate to succeed Luis de Guindos in the position of Vice-President of the European Central Bank; following a vote within the Eurogroup, the role eventually went to Boris Vujčić instead.

== Other activities ==
European Union organizations

- European Investment Bank (EIB), Ex-Officio Member of the Board of Governors (2015–2020)
- European Stability Mechanism (ESM), Member of the Board of Governors (2015–2020)

International organizations

- African Development Bank (AfDB), Ex-Officio Member of the Board of Governors (2015–2020)
- Asian Development Bank (ADB), Ex-Officio Member of the Board of Governors (2015–2020)
- European Bank for Reconstruction and Development (EBRD), Ex-Officio Member of the Board of Governors (2015–2020)
- Inter-American Investment Corporation (IIC), Ex-Officio Member of the Board of Governors (2015–2020)
- Multilateral Investment Guarantee Agency (MIGA), World Bank Group, Ex-Officio Member of the Board of Governors (2015–2020)
- World Bank, Ex-Officio Member of the Board of Governors (2015–2020)

Non-profit organizations

- Osservatorio Permanente Giovani-Editori, Member of the International Advisory Board
- Institute of Labor Economics (IZA), Fellow (since 2009)
- Portuguese Economic Journal, Member of the Editorial Board (since 2001)

== Recognition ==
- 2001 – Young Economist Award of the European Economic Association (EEA)
- 2006 – Latin Union Award for Scientific Merit

== Personal life ==
Centeno was married to Maria Margarida Morgado, one of his university classmates from ISEG, and had three children with her. She died in 2022.

As a student, Centeno played rugby for the rugby team of the economics school. He is a keen soccer enthusiast and supports Lisbon club Benfica. He wore a Portugal national football team scarf to the first Eurogroup meeting after his country's team won the European championship in 2016.

Political offices
Preceded by Maria Luís Albuquerque	Minister of Finance; 2015–2020	Succeeded by João Leão
Diplomatic posts
Preceded by Jeroen Dijsselbloem	President of the Eurogroup; 2018–2020	Succeeded by Paschal Donohoe
Government offices
Preceded by Carlos Costa	Governor of the Bank of Portugal; 2020–2025	Succeeded by Álvaro Santos Pereira
