= Banco Português de Negócios =

Banco Português de Negócios (Portuguese pronunciation: [ˈbɐ̃ku puɾtuˈɣeʒ ðɨ nɨˈɣɔsjuʃ], lit. 'Portuguese Bank of Business'), or simply BPN, was a Portuguese banking institution. It used to be a private bank, but was nationalized by the Portuguese Government in 2008 after a bad management and malpractice-related debt of 1.800 billion euros and several irregularities uncovered in the institution. In 2012, BPN, stripped of many of its debts and bad loans, was sold to Angola’s Banco BIC for €40 million.

== History ==
BPN - Banco Português De Negócios, S.A. was founded in 1993 from the merger of Soserfin and Norcrédito and was based in Lisbon.

== Scandal ==
Portugal's Finance Minister Fernando Teixeira dos Santos told a press conference after a special cabinet meeting that the government was to assure deposits in BPN, and that the management of BPN was to be given to the Caixa Geral de Depósitos (Portugal's public bank) under Bank of Portugal's (Banco de Portugal, the Portuguese Central Bank) supervision from November 3, 2008, to prevent a financial crisis chain reaction in Portugal. Portuguese judicial authorities detained the former president of financially troubled BPN. José Oliveira e Costa, who was the CEO of BPN between 1997 and early 2008, was arrested on charges of suspected tax fraud, money laundering, forgery, abuse of credit and illegal gains.

In spite of having "a market share of around 2 percent", the case of BPN was particularly serious because of its political implications - Portugal's then current President Aníbal Cavaco Silva and some of his political allies maintained personal and business relationships with the bank and Oliveira e Costa

In the grounds of avoiding a potentially serious financial crisis in the Portuguese economy, the Portuguese government decided to give them a bailout, eventually at a future loss to taxpayers. Because of that, the role of Banco de Portugal (BdP) (Portuguese Central Bank) in regulating and supervising the Portuguese banking system, when it was led by Vítor Constâncio from 2000 to 2010, has been the subject of heated argument, particularly whether Vítor Constâncio and the BdP had the means to do something or whether they revealed gross incompetence. In December 2010, Constâncio was appointed vice president of the European Central Bank, for an eight-year mandate, being responsible for banking supervision. Shortly after, in April 2011, the Portuguese Government would request international financial assistance as the State itself would be declared insolvent.

== Art collection ==
The bank's art collection, including 85 works by the Catalan artist Joan Miró acquired from a private collection in Japan between 2003 and 2006, became state property in 2008 as part of the nationalization. In early 2014, the Miró paintings were scheduled to be sold by its then-owner, Portuguese state holding company Parvalorem, at Christie's in London. They had never been displayed publicly in the country. The most notable works included La Fornarina (After Raphael) (1929), with an estimated value of £2 million - £3 million, and Femmes et Oiseaux, which was expected to fetch £4 million - £8 million. Portugal hoped to earn at least $50 million from the sale. A group of opposition lawmakers appealed to Portugal’s public prosecutor to stop the sale. Lisbon’s administrative court, however, ruled that the sale had not been decided on directly by the government of Prime Minister Pedro Passos Coelho and that Parvalorem had not breached any administrative rule. Socialist and communist deputies also raised the issue in parliament, but their bid to prevent the planned sale was outvoted by the ruling centre-right coalition. Still, Christie's withdraw the works from sale only hours before the auction was scheduled to start, citing "legal uncertainties created by this ongoing dispute".
