= Carlos da Silva Costa =

Portuguese economist (born 1949)

Carlos Costa
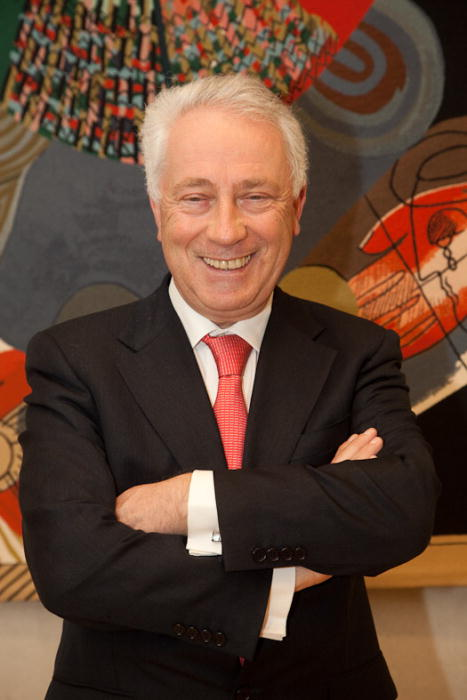

Governor of the Bank of Portugal
- In office 7 June 2010 – 20 July 2020
- Preceded by: Vítor Constâncio
- Succeeded by: Mário Centeno

Personal details
- Born: 3 November 1949 (age 76) Oliveira de Azeméis, Portugal
- Education: University of Porto
- Occupation: Economist

Carlos da Silva Costa (born 3 November 1949, in Oliveira de Azeméis) is a Portuguese economist who served as Governor of the Bank of Portugal from 7 June 2010 to 20 July 2020, when he was succeeded by Mário Centeno.

== Career ==
Carlos Costa started his career in 1973 as a lecturer in economics at the University of Porto and graduated there. Following his graduation he continued his studies at Sorbonne and then in 1981 went to the former Banco Português do Atlântico, now Banco Comercial Português (BCP), research department. As a senior attaché in the Portuguese Permanent Representation to the EU and a member of the EU's economic policy committee from 1986 to 1992, he was engaged in European integration before becoming chief of staff of the Portuguese European Commissioner João de Deus Pinheiro from 1993 to 1999.

Prior to his appointment to the European Investment Bank, Costa had positions on the board of directors at Caixa Geral de Aposentações, a bank for pension funds, Banco Nacional Ultramarino and Itaú Unibanco holdings.

=== European Investment Bank, 2006–2010 ===
In 2006, Costa became vice president of the European Investment Bank under the leadership of president Philippe Maystadt. He was responsible for the banks' funding financing operations in Spain, Portugal, Belgium and Luxembourg, as well as in Asia and South America. He was also a member of the Committee of European Securities Regulators.

=== Banco de Portugal, 2010–2020 ===
On 22 April 2010, Costa was nominated for a five-year term by the Portuguese government, recommended by the Finance minister Teixeira dos Santos. He replaced Vítor Constâncio, who became vice president of the European Central Bank on 1 June 2010.

In this capacity, Costa also holds the following positions:

- European Central Bank (ECB), Ex-Officio Member of the Governing Council and member of the ECB Supervisory Board
- European Systemic Risk Board (ESRB), Member of the General Board
- Financial Stability Board (FSB), Member of the Regional Consultative Group for Europe
- International Monetary Fund (IMF), Ex-Officio Member of the Board of Governors
- National Council of Financial Supervisors, Chairman
- School of Economics and Management of Universidade Católica Portuguesa, Chairman of the Consultative Council

== Controversy ==
In early 2016, Prime Minister António Costa caused controversy by attacking Costa and the central bank for being “irresponsible” by “dragging out” a decision over compensation claimed by commercial paper investors hit by the collapse in 2014 of Banco Espírito Santo (BES). The Left Bloc (BE) and the Portuguese Communist Party (PCP) openly called for Costa to resign. The attacks triggered a political storm over what the centre-right opposition described as a “shameful” attempt to interfere in the regulator's independence.
