= Composite (finance) =

A composite or a composite index is a combination of equities or indices intended to measure the overall market performance over time.

A composite index may also be used in the natural or social sciences to summarize complex or multidimensional data or redundant measures. An example of a composite index in the social sciences is used in the European Lifelong Learning Indicators (ELLI) project.
