= Álvaro Santos Pereira =

Portuguese economist, professor and writer (born 1972)

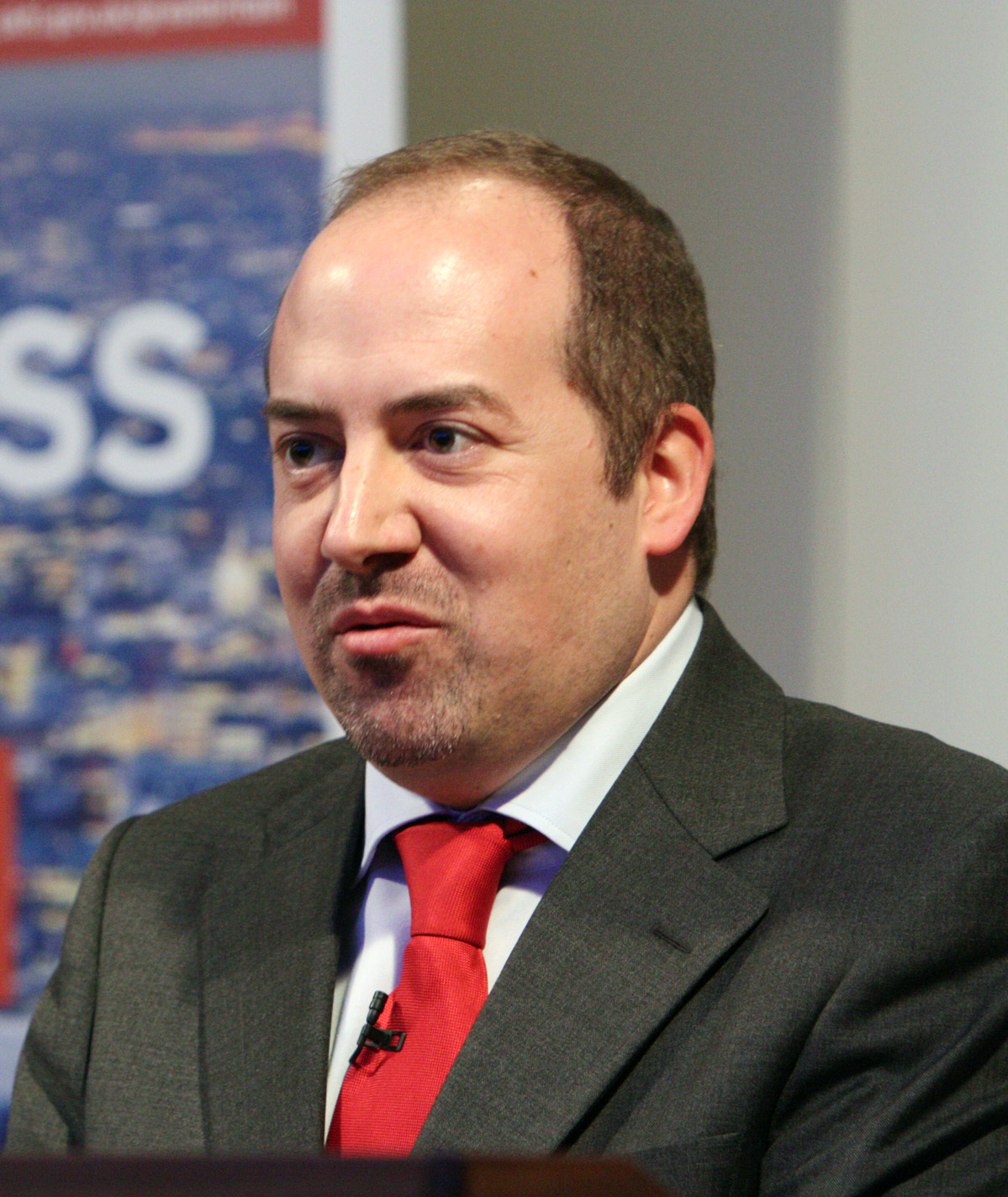
- Santos Pereira in 2013

Governor of the Bank of Portugal
- Incumbent
- Assumed office 6 October 2025
- Preceded by: Mário Centeno

Minister of Economy and Labour
- In office 21 June 2011 – 24 July 2013
- Prime Minister: Pedro Passos Coelho
- Preceded by: José António Vieira da Silva (as Minister of Economy, Innovation and Development); Helena André (as Minister of Labour and Social Security)
- Succeeded by: António Pires de Lima

Personal details
- Born: Álvaro Miguel Rodrigues dos Santos Pereira; 7 January 1972 (age 54) Viseu, Portugal
- Citizenship: Portugal; Canada
- Party: Independent
- Education: University of Coimbra; University of Exeter; Simon Fraser University
- Occupation: Economist • Professor
- Awards: Order of Prince Henry (2016)

Álvaro Miguel Rodrigues dos Santos Pereira (born 7 January 1972) is a Portuguese economist, professor and writer and current governor of the Bank of Portugal. He was the Minister of Economy and Labour of Portugal between June 2011 and July 2013 in the XIX Constitutional Government of Portugal.

== Early life and education ==
Santos Pereira was born in Viseu, Portugal in 1972. He attended the University of Coimbra in Coimbra, where he was awarded a degree in economics by the Faculdade de Economia da Universidade de Coimbra (FEUC) (Economics School of the University of Coimbra) and has a master's degree by the University of Exeter. He is also a PhD in economics by the Simon Fraser University (British Columbia, Canada).

== Career ==
Santos Pereira worked as professor of economic development and economic policy at the Simon Fraser University and the University of British Columbia.

From 2011 to 2013, Santos Pereira served as Minister of Economy, Labour, Transport, Public Works and Communications of Portugal in the cabinet of Prime Minister Pedro Passos Coelho.

As minister, Santos Pereira helped design reforms of the labour market and competition laws. His tenure as minister also became known due to his initial aggressive stance against the energy lobby – led by EDP – Electricidade de Portugal – and conciliatory settlement in the end. The negotiations regarding excessive rents led by Santos Pereira, resulted in EDP receiving less €30 million p.a. It now appears that excessive rents being charged by EDP could have amounted to €2 billion.

Since 2014, Santos Pereira has been serving as Director of the Country Studies Branch of the OECD Economics Department.

Santos Pereira was nominated as Governor of the Bank of Portugal in July 2025 and took office on 6 October 2025, succeeding Mário Centeno.
