= Vítor Constâncio =

Portuguese economist and politician (born 1943)

Vítor Constâncio GCC GColIH
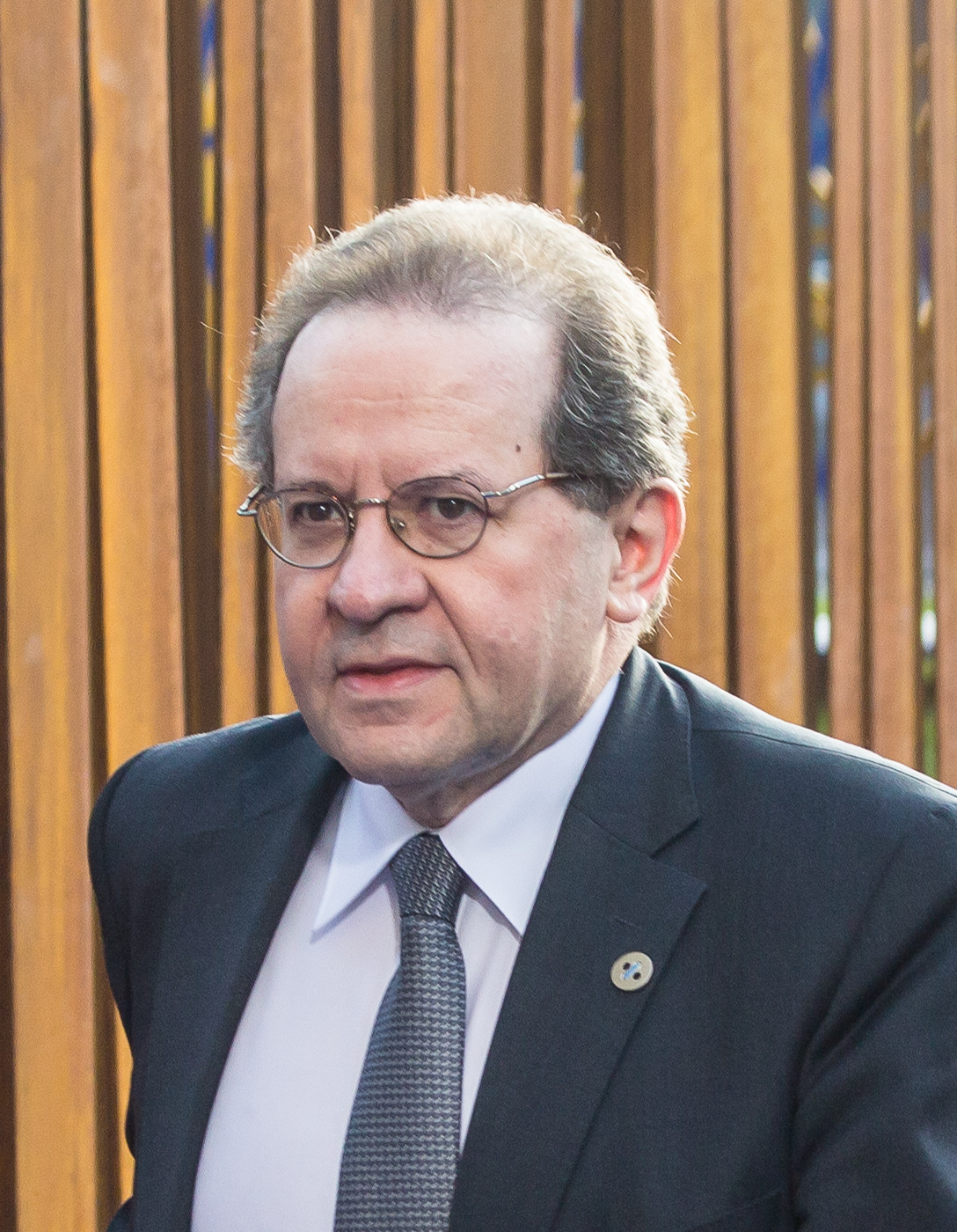
- Constâncio in 2017

Vice-President of the European Central Bank
- In office 1 June 2010 – 31 May 2018
- President: Jean-Claude Trichet; Mario Draghi
- Preceded by: Lucas Papademos
- Succeeded by: Luis de Guindos

Governor of the Bank of Portugal
- In office February 2000 – May 2010
- Preceded by: António de Sousa
- Succeeded by: Carlos Costa
- In office September 1985 – May 1986
- Preceded by: José da Silva Lopes
- Succeeded by: Tavares Moreira

Secretary-General of the Socialist Party
- In office 29 June 1986 – 16 January 1989
- President: Manuel Tito de Morais
- Preceded by: Mário Soares
- Succeeded by: Jorge Sampaio

Minister of Finance and Planning
- In office 30 January 1978 – 29 August 1978
- Prime Minister: Mário Soares
- Preceded by: Henrique Medina Carreira (Finance); António Sousa Gomes (Planning and Economic Coordination)
- Succeeded by: José da Silva Lopes

Personal details
- Born: Vítor Manuel Ribeiro Constâncio; 12 October 1943 (age 83) Lisbon, Portugal
- Party: Socialist
- Spouse: Maria José Pardana (m. 1968)
- Children: 2
- Education: University of Lisbon; University of Bristol
- Website: Official website

Vítor Manuel Ribeiro Constâncio GCC GColIH (born 12 October 1943) is a Portuguese economist and academic who most recently served as Vice-President of the European Central Bank, from 2010 to 2018. He previously served as Minister of Finance in 1978 and Governor of the Bank of Portugal from 1985 to 1986 and from 2000 to 2010.

Since June 2018 he has been a professor at the School of Economics & Business Administration of the University of Navarra.

== Education ==
Constâncio graduated in economics from the Technical University of Lisbon (now called the University of Lisbon) in 1965 and obtained a master's degree at the University of Bristol in 1973-1974.

== Career ==
=== Academic career and national public office ===
Constâncio was Assistant Professor in Economics at the Technical University of Lisbon from 1965 to 1973.

From 1974 to 1975, he was Secretary of State for Planning in the I and II Provisional Government of Portugal, and Secretary of State for Budget and Planning in 1976 in the IV Provisional Government. This was directly in the wake of the Carnation Revolution. He then became Minister of Finance from January to August 1978 in the II Constitutional Government of Portugal, and is therefore until now the youngest Portuguese Finance Minister since the revolution. In 1980-1981, he was a professor at the Portuguese Catholic University.

Constâncio was secretary-general of the Socialist Party from 1986 to 1989. He lost the legislative elections of 19 July 1987, but remained in office. He resigned the following year, being replaced by Jorge Sampaio.

Constâncio was governor of the Banco de Portugal, the Portuguese central bank, for the first time in 1985–86, having been appointed vice-governor in 1977, in 1979, and in the period from 1981 to 1984.

From 1993 to 1994, Constâncio served as chairman of Lisboa 94, the entity in charge of organizing the commemorative events of Lisbon as European Capital of Culture.

Between 1995 and 1999, Constâncio was a member of the Portuguese Council of State. During the same period, he served as Member of the Board (Executive Director) of Banco Português de Investimento (BPI), a leading private Portuguese banking group, with responsibility for Budget, Accounting and Control of Financial Market Risks. In this capacity, he represented BPI as non-executive member of the board of Portugal Telecom and subsequently as non-executive member of the Board of Energias de Portugal.

Constâncio served once more as governor of the Banco de Portugal from 2000 to 2010, having been re-appointed in 2006. Under his presidency the Bank of Portugal spent one third of its original holdings of 600 tons of gold to 400 tons, approximately.

While in office, he advocated salaries stagnation or increases below inflation, as a way to increase the Portuguese economy's competitiveness. In 2005, Constâncio enraged right-wing politicians when he reviewed the previous conservative government's figures and revised the deficit up from around 3% to 6.8%. Two Portuguese banks (Banco Português de Negócios (BPN) and Banco Privado Português (BPP)) had been accumulating losses for years due to bad investments, embezzlement and accounting fraud. The Portuguese Central Bank, led by Constâncio, was criticized for having allowed this situation for years.

=== European Central Bank, 2010–2018 ===
Constâncio was first mentioned as a potential vice president of the European Central Bank in 2002, to replace Christian Noyer. At the time, he cited family reasons for refusing to run for the post.

Constâncio was eventually appointed vice president of European Central Bank in 2010, for an eight-year mandate. At the time, he was chosen by Eurozone finance ministers ahead of Peter Praet, director of the National Bank of Belgium, and Yves Mersch, the governor of the Bank of Luxembourg, to replace Lucas Papademos of Greece. During his time at the ECB, he developed a reputation as an inflation dove who often emphasised the need for economic growth.

Shortly after, on 6 April 2011, the Portuguese Government, facing increasing difficulties in securing its financing needs in the international financial markets, formally requested international financial assistance leading to a €78 billion program with equal participation of the European Financial Stabilisation Mechanism, European Financial Stability Facility and International Monetary Fund.

In June 2018, at the end of his term of office, he was replaced as ECB vice president by Luis de Guindos.

=== Post European Central Bank ===
Since June 2018 he has been a professor at the School of Economics & Business Administration of the University of Navarra.

== Personal life ==
In 1968 he married Maria José Pardana. They have one son and one daughter.

== Electoral history ==
=== PS leadership election, 1986 ===
Ballot: 29 June 1986
Candidate	Votes	%
Vítor Constâncio		79
Jaime Gama		21
Turnout		
Source: Acção Socialista

=== Legislative election, 1987 ===
Ballot: 19 July 1987
Party	Candidate	Votes	%	Seats	+/−
PSD	Aníbal Cavaco Silva	2,850,784	50.2	148	+60
PS	Vítor Constâncio	1,262,506	22.2	60	+3
CDU	Álvaro Cunhal	689,137	12.1	31	–7
PRD	António Ramalho Eanes	278,561	4.9	7	–38
CDS	Adriano Moreira	251,987	4.4	4	–18
Other parties		219,715	3.9	0	±0
Blank/Invalid ballots		123,668	2.2	–	–
Turnout		5,676,358	71.57	250	±0
Source: Comissão Nacional de Eleições

== Other activities ==
- Center for Economic and Policy Research (CEPR), Distinguished Fellow (since 2019)
- Financial Stability Board (FSB), Ex-Officio Member of the Standing Committee on Supervisory and Regulatory Cooperation
- Banco de Portugal, Member of the Advisory Board

Party political offices
Preceded by Mário Soares	Secretary General of the Socialist Party; 1986–1989	Succeeded by Jorge Sampaio
Government offices
Preceded by António de Sousa	Governor of the Bank of Portugal; 2000–2010	Succeeded by Carlos Costa
Preceded by Lucas Papademos	Vice-President of the European Central Bank; 2010–2018	Succeeded by Luis de Guindos
