= Gerhard Stahl =

Secretary-General of the European Committee of the Regions
- In office 1 April 2004 – 1 September 2014
- Preceded by: Vincenzo Falcone
- Succeeded by: Jiří Buriánek

Personal details
- Born: 2 December 1950 (age 75) Ludwigsburg, Baden-Württemberg, West Germany
- Education: Technische Universität Berlin

Gerhard Stahl (born in Ludwigsburg, Baden-Württemberg, West Germany on 2 December 1950) is since August 2014 Professor at the Peking University HSBC Business School in Shenzhen in China. In addition he teaches as visiting professor at the College of Europe. Until April 2014 he was an EU official, the former Secretary-General of the Committee of the Regions of the European Union.

== Education ==
Stahl was educated in his home city of Ludwigsburg and went on to graduate in economics at Technische Universität Berlin.

== Career ==
=== 1970s to 1995 ===
Stahl had his first professional post as an assistant to the chair of public finance at Technische Universität Berlin. He then spent three years working as an economist at the Federal Ministry of Finance (Germany) in Bonn. He also worked in the European Union and on the regional level in Schleswig-Holstein at the Ministry for Economics, Transport and Research and later on as Director-General for European and International Affairs at the Ministry for European and Federal Affairs. In this role, he specialised in EU policy preparation for the Bundesrat, the German legislative second chamber, and inter-regional cooperation projects.

=== 1995 to present ===
From 1995-1999, Stahl was a Member of the Cabinet of European Commissioner for Regional Policy Dr Monika Wulf-Mathies. From 1999-2002, he was Deputy Head of Cabinet for Pedro Solbes, the European Commissioner for Economic and Monetary Affairs.

In September 2002, Stahl was appointed director for consultative work at the European Committee of the Regions; he was Secretary-General of the CoR from 1 April 2004 until 2014, when he completed his second 5-year term of office (2009–2014).

Stahl is a Member of the Advisory Committee (Kuratorium) of the IFO-Research Institute in Munich and member of the International Institute of Public Finance e. V.

Gerhard Stahl is a member of the European Statistical Advisory Committee (ESAC). He is a member of the Administrative Council of the Madariaga – College of Europe Foundation and also a member of the Scientific Council of the Foundation for European Progressive Studies (FEPS). He was appointed in 2013 as Visiting Professor by the Academic Council of the College of Europe. He teaches in the Department of European Economic Studies.

== Honors and awards ==
In 2006, he was awarded the Medal for Outstanding Service to Bavaria in a United Europe by the State-Government of Bavaria. In 2008, he was elected President of the Management Board of the Office for Official Publications of the European Union, for a mandate of one year which was renewed for a second year.

== Publications ==
Stahl is an author of several publications on Economic, Regional and European Policy issues.

1. "Das neue Budgetkonzept des Sachverständigenrates" in: Wirtschaftsdienst 1980/II, HWWA-Institut, Hamburg.
2. "Die Gemeinschaft an der Grenze der Finanziellen Handlungsfähigkeit" in: Wirtschaftsdienst 1980/XI·
3. "EG-Haushalt:Enttäuschende Kommissionsvorschläge" in: Wirtschaftsdienst 1981/VII·
4. "Budgetary Problems of the EC" in: Intereconomics, Hamburg, September 1983·
5. "Die Vorschläge der EG-Kommission zur Haushaltsreform" in: Wirtschaftsdienst 1987/IV·
6. "Commission Proposals on Budgetary Reform" in: Intereconomics, Hamburg, May 1987·
7. "EC Medium-term Financial Planning" in: Intereconomics, January, February 1989·
8. "German unification and the EC's Budget and Budgetary Policy" in: German Unification in European Perspective Hrsg. Wolfgang Heisenberg, Brüssel, 1991·
9. "La integración económica y política algunas consideracionesbasadas en la experiencia practica del proceso de integración europea" in: Arbeitspapier des "Training Centre for Regional Integration", Montevideo, 13. September 1993·
10. "Zur Beschäftigungskrise in der EU" in: Wirtschaftsdienst, March 1994·
11. "Die Regionen aus der Sicht des Europäischen Parlaments" in: Färber, Forsyth (Hrsg.) "The Regions – Factors of Integration or Disintegration in Europe? Nomos-Verlag, Baden-Baden 1996·
12. "Die EU-Strukturpolitik: Zielorientierung, Wirkungen, Effizienz" in: Caesar (Hrsg.) "Zur Reform der Finanzverfassung und Strukturpolitik der EU", Nomos-Verlag, Baden-Baden, 1997·
13. "Die Zukunft der Europäischen Strukturfonds" in: "Europa-Kommunal" Nr. 4/97·
14. "Die Europäische Währungsunion – Entwicklung, Perspektiven, Chancen und Risiken" in: epd-Dokumentation Nr. 7/97·
15. "Die Zukunft der Europäischen Struktur- und Regionalpolitik" in: RGE – Dokumentation vom 5.6.1998·
16. "Entwicklungstendenzender europäischen Finanzdienstleistungsmärkte aus EU-Sicht"in: Simmert (Hrsg.) Finanzdienstleistungsmärkte, Stuttgart 2000·
17. "A Cohesion Policy for the Future" in: Intereconomics, Hamburg, November/December 2003·
18. "Regionale Kooperation im europäischen Vergleich – Ostsee- und Mittelmeerzusammenarbeit in der europäischen Union" in: SCHIFF Schleswig-Holsteinisches Institut für Friedenswissenschaften an der Christian-Albrechts-Universität Kiel (Hrsg.), Kiel 2005·
19. "In Vielfalt geeint: Wie kann das Europa der Staaten, Regionenund Bürger im globalen Wettbewerb bestehen?" in: Astrid Epiney, Marcel Haag, Andreas Heinemann(Hrsg.) "Die Herausforderungen von Grenzen ", Nomos-Verlag, Baden-Baden, 2007·
20. "Die Rolle des AdR bei der europäischen Vorfeldarbeit der Regionen und Kommunen" in: Schriftenreihe des Europäischen Zentrums fürFöderalismus-Forschung (Hrsg.) "Föderalismusreform und Europapolitik", Nomos-Verlag, Baden-Baden, 2007·
21. "Das Subsidiaritätsnetzwerk des Ausschusses der Regionen" Gerhard Stahl/Christian Gsodam in: Europäisches Zentrum für Föderalismus-Forschung Tübingen (Hrsg.)"Jahrbuch des Föderalismus 2008 – Föderalismus, Subsidiarität und Regionenin Europa", Nomos-Verlag, Baden-Baden, 2008·
22. "Die Zukunft der Regionen in Europa" in: Wissenschaftsförderung derSparkassen-Finanzgruppe e.V. (Hrsg.) "Tagungsband des Sparkassenhistorisches Symposiums 2007 in Braunschweig – Wenn's um die Regiongeht…Sparkasse", Deutscher Sparkassenverlag GmbH, Stuttgart, 2009·
23. "Experiences and Actions of the Committee of the Regions of the European Union" in: Prof. Dr. Joseph Straus, Max Planck Institute for Intellectual Property, Competition and Tax Law, Munich(Hrsg.) "The Role of Law and Ethics in the Globalized Economy", Springer-Verlag Berlin Heidelberg 2009·
24. "Minorities in a Seamless Europe" in: State Secretariat for Minority and National Policy of the Hungarian Prime Minister's Office (Hrsg.), proceedings of the international conference Budapest, 15 September 2009·
25. "Europe 2020: multilevel governance in action" Gerhard Stahl/Gianluca Spinaci in "European Policy Centre (EPC) ChallengeEurope" (Hrsg.), Issue 20 "Europe 2020: delivering well-being for future Europeans", European Policy Centre, Brussels, March 2010·
26. "Vorbereitung der Europäischen Union auf 2020-2030 – Neues Regieren in Partnerschaft" in: Abels, Gabriele / Eppler, Annegret / Knodt, Michèle (Hrsg.): Die EU-Reflexionsgruppe "Horizont 2020-2030", Herausforderungen und Reformoptionen für das Mehrebenensystem. Schriftenreihedes Arbeitskreises Europäische Integration e.V. Band 69, Baden-Baden, Nomos-Verlagsgesellschaft 2010.·
27. "Neues Regieren in Partnerschaft: Das Weißbuch des Ausschusses der Regionen zur Multi-Level-Governance in der EU" in: Europäisches Zentrum für Föderalismus-Forschung Tübingen (Hrsg.) "Jahrbuch des Föderalismus2010 – Föderalismus, Subsidiarität und Regionen in Europa", Baden-Baden, Nomos-Verlagsgesellschaft 2010.·
28. "The role of regions in development policy" in: The Parliament Magazine's Regional Review(Hrsg.), Issue 20, March 2011, London, Dods·
29. "The Road of China's Economic Transition" in: Manhong Mannie Liu (Hrsg.) "The Green Economy and Its Implementation in China", Enrich Professional Publishing (May 2011)·
30. "Das Subsidiaritätswerk des Ausschusses der Regionen" Gerhard Stahl/Manfred Degen in: Verbindungsstelle der österreichischen Bundesländer (Hrsg.) "Festschrift 60 Jahre Verbindungsstelle der österreichischenBundesländer" (July 2011)·
31. "Die Rolle der Kohäsionspolitik in der Wirtschafts- und Währungsunion im Rahmen des europäischen Mehrebenensystems" Gerhard Stahl/Christian Gsodam in: Europäisches Zentrum für Föderalismus-Forschung (Hrsg.): Jahrbuch des Föderalismus 2011, Baden-Baden, Nomos-Verlagsgesellschaft 2011
32. "Die Rolle der deutschen Landesvertretungen für den Ausschuss der Regionen" Gerhard Stahl/Dr.Manfred Degen in: Wolfgang Renzsch/Thomas Wobben (Hrsg.): "20 Jahre ostdeutscheLandesvertretungen in Brüssel – Eine Bilanz der Interessenvertretung der Länderaus unterschiedlichen Blickwinkeln". Schriftenreihe des Europäischen Zentrums für Föderalismus-Forschung, Band 39, Baden-Baden, Nomos-Verlagsgesellschaft 2013.
33. "Die Europäisierung der Kommunen und der Ausschuss der Regionen" Gerhard Stahl/Manfred Degen in Elisabeth Alber/Carolin Zwilling (Hrsg.) "Gemeinden im Europäischen Mehrebenensystem im 21. Jahrhundert", Baden-Baden, Nomos Verlagsgesellschaft 2014.
34. "Jeder für sich -nationaler Protektionismus stellt eine offene Weltwirtschaft in Frage" in Zeitschrift für das gesamte Kreditwesen, 02.04.2020, Seiten 329 ff.
35. "Deutschlands Interessen an der Europäischen Integration stehen zur Debatte" in Zeitschrift für das gesamte Kreditwesen, 26.02.2020, Seite 497 ff.
36. "Über die langfristige Entwicklungsstrategie eines autoritären Systems, 2049 - die chinesische Vision" in Neue Gesellschaft, Frankfurter Hefte, Ausgabe 5/2022
37. "China Zukunftsmodell oder Albtraum? Europa zwischen Partnerschaft und Konfrontation" Bonn, Dietz Verlag 2022.
38. "China: Dangerous Rival or Cooperation Partner? How can EU-China relations develop in a changing world with geopolitical conflicts?", Bonn Dietz Verlag 2024.
