= Portuguese Economic Journal =

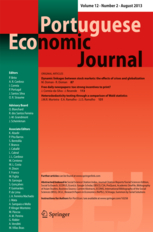
- Discipline: Economics
- Language: English
- Edited by: Luís F. Costa

Publication details
- History: 2002–present
- Publisher: Springer Science+Business Media on behalf of ISEG, University of Lisbon (Portugal)
- Frequency: Triannually
- Impact factor: 1.1 (2025)

Standard abbreviations
- ISO 4: Port. Econ. J.

Indexing
- ISSN: 1617-982X (print); 1617-9838 (web)

Links
- Journal homepage; Online archive

The Portuguese Economic Journal is a triannual peer-reviewed academic journal of economics. It is published by Springer Science+Business Media on behalf of ISEG, University of Lisbon and the editor-in-chief is Luís F. Costa (ISEG). The journal was established in 2002 with Paulo Brito as its founding editor-in-chief (until 2014). The journal organizes an annual meeting, held at different Portuguese universities.

== Abstracting and indexing ==
The journal is abstracted and indexed in:

- Academic OneFile
- CSA Environmental Sciences
- EconLit
- EBSCO databases
- International Bibliography of the Social Sciences
- ProQuest databases
- Research Papers in Economics
- Scopus
- Social Sciences Citation Index

According to the Journal Citation Reports, the journal has a 2025 impact factor of 1.1. In their ranking of academic impact of economics journals, Kalaitzidakis et al. (2011) rank it 142nd out of 219 journals.
