= European Multilateral Clearing Facility N.V. =

Clearing house in the Netherlands

- Industry: Financial services
- Founded: 2007; 19 years ago
- Headquarters: Amsterdam, Netherlands
- Key people: Jan Booij (CEO)
- Products: Clearing house
- Owner: ABN AMRO (78%); Nasdaq (22%)
- Website: www.euroccp.com

The European Multilateral Clearing Facility N.V. (EMCF) was a clearing house based in the Netherlands for equity trades done on stock exchanges or multilateral trading facility throughout Europe.

It was established after the Markets in Financial Instruments Directive (MiFID) regulations were passed by the European Union allowing competition for clearing services. EMCF helped reduce the cost of clearing within Europe as it competed directly with the established clearing houses in each member state forcing them to reduce prices.

== History ==
The European legislation MiFID, implemented in November 2007, forced order flow providers to direct their flow to the venue of best execution. EMCF was established to service the market for securities trading after the introduction of MiFID. Competition in the area has forced the slashing of fees by European clearers. EMCF and its competitors lowered clearing fees several times.

In 2007, Chi-X Europe appointed EMCF as their central counterparty. Nowadays, EMCF offered services to BATS Europe, Burgundy AB, CATS os, Chi-X- Europe, First North Securities, NasdaqOMX Nordic (Denmark, Finland & Sweden), Quote MTF and The order Machine (TOM).

Also in 2008, nasdaq acquired a 22 percent equity stake in EMCF from Fortis Bank Nederland Holding N.V.

In 2008, following Fortis' near bankruptcy the European Central Counterparty offered to clear trades instead of EMCF. Fortis was nationalised by the Dutch Government to stop it failing, and EMCF became part of ABN AMRO.

In 2013–2014, EMCF merged with EuroCCP to form a new company, also called EuroCCP.
