= Jacques Delors =

French politician (1925–2023)

His Excellency Jacques Delors
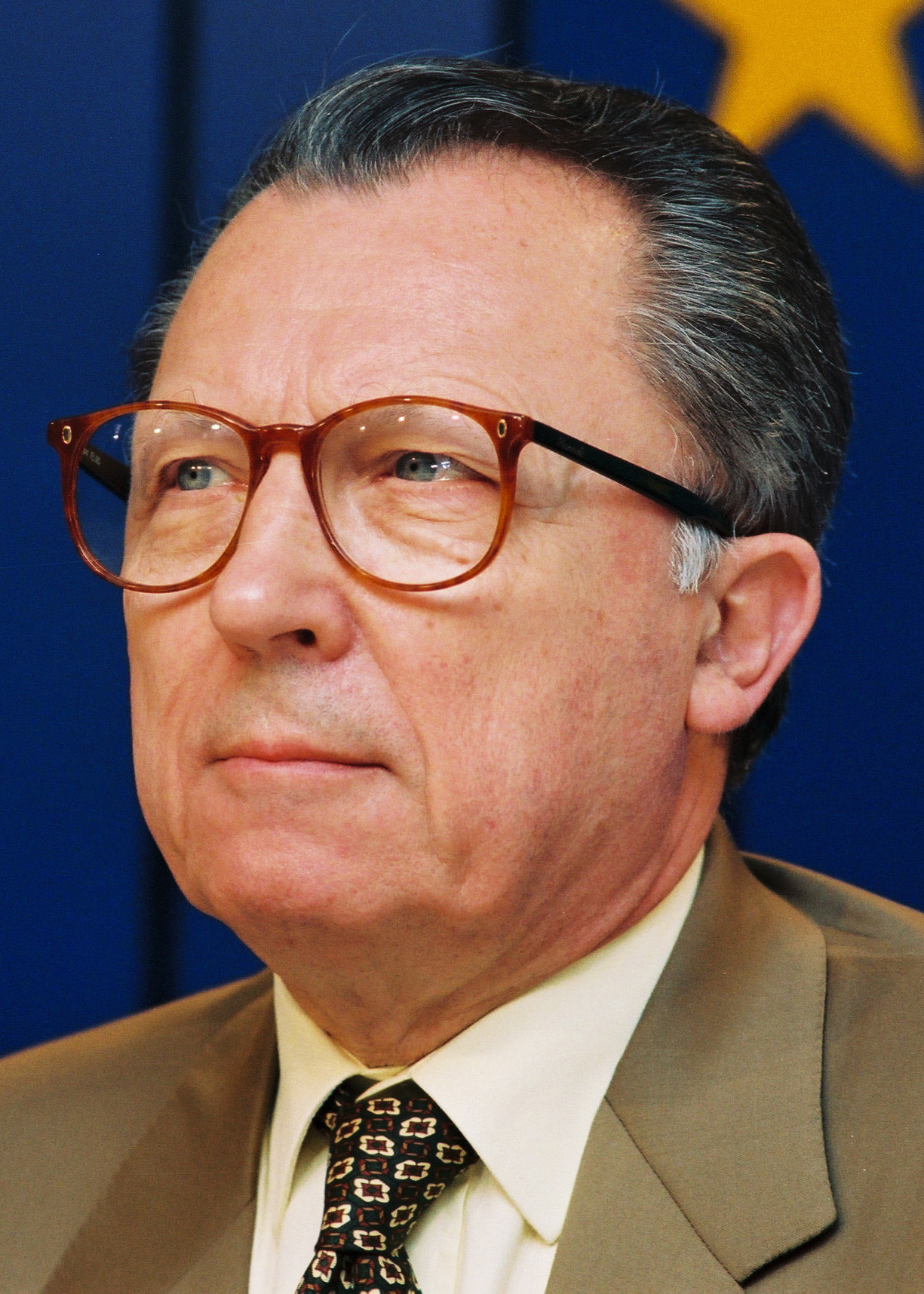
- Delors in 1993

President of the European Commission
- In office 7 January 1985 – 24 January 1995
- Vice President: Frans Andriessen
- Preceded by: Gaston Thorn
- Succeeded by: Jacques Santer

Mayor of Clichy
- In office 19 March 1983 – 19 December 1984
- Preceded by: Gaston Roche
- Succeeded by: Gilles Catoire

Minister of Finance
- In office 22 May 1981 – 17 July 1984
- Prime Minister: Pierre Mauroy
- Preceded by: René Monory
- Succeeded by: Pierre Bérégovoy

Member of the European Parliament
- In office 1 July 1979 – 25 May 1981
- Constituency: East France

Personal details
- Born: Jacques Lucien Jean Delors; 20 July 1925 Paris, France
- Died: 27 December 2023 (aged 98) Paris, France
- Party: Socialist
- Spouse: Marie Lephaille (m. 1948; died 2020)
- Children: 2, including Martine
- Education: University of Paris

Jacques Lucien Jean Delors (French: [ʒak lysjɛ̃ ʒɑ̃ dəlɔʁ]; 20 July 1925 – 27 December 2023) was a French politician who served as president of the European Commission from 1985 to 1995. Delors played a key role in the creation of the European single market, the euro and the evolution of the (then) European Economic Community (EEC) towards the modern European Union (EU).

As president of the European Commission (EC), Delors was the most visible and influential leader in European affairs. He proposed policies that closely linked the member nations together and promoted greater union. Executing the decisions of the European Council, he established a single market that made possible the free movement of goods, capital, services, and workers (known collectively as the "four freedoms of the European Union"). He also headed the Delors Committee, which proposed the monetary union to create the euro, a new single currency to replace individual national currencies. This was achieved when member states ratified the Maastricht Treaty in 1992.

Delors was a member of the French Socialist Party. Before becoming president of the EC, he was France's finance minister from 1981 to 1984, and a member of the European Parliament from 1979 to 1981.

== French politics ==
Born in Paris in a family originating from Corrèze, Delors first held in the 1940s through the 1960s a series of posts in French banking and state planning with the Bank of France. As a member of the French Confederation of Christian Workers (CFTC), he participated in its secularization and the foundation of the French Democratic Confederation of Labour (CFDT). In 1969, he became social affairs adviser to the Gaullist Prime Minister Jacques Chaban-Delmas, a move which was presented as part of Chaban's outreach to the centre-ground and first attracted media attention to Delors personally.

In 1957, Delors left the CFDT when he became a high government official to avoid conflicts of interests. In 1974, he joined the Socialist Party, with other left-wing Christians. He was one of the rare members of the party to be openly religious, thus challenging its long-standing secular tradition of laïcité. He served in the European Parliament from 1979 to 1981, becoming chairman of its Committee on Economic and Monetary Affairs, actively taking part in debates about economic, social, and monetary policies. Under President François Mitterrand, Delors served as Economics and Finance Minister from 1981 to 1983, and Economics, Finance, and Budget Minister from 1983 to 1984. He advocated a pause in the social policies, a clear acceptance of the market economy, and an alignment with European social democracy. Critically, he held the line on France's membership of the European Monetary System (EMS), giving priority to monetary stability over left-wing spending priorities. Mitterrand flirted with the idea of naming him Prime Minister, but never made the appointment.

== President of the European Commission ==
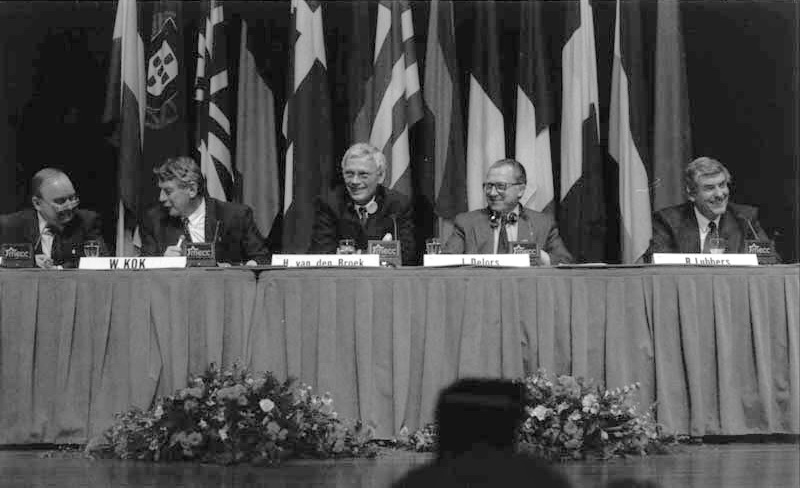
Press conference (from left to right) with Danish minister of finance, Henning Christophersen, Dutch ministers Wim Kok, Hans van den Broek and Ruud Lubbers, after the European Council in Maastricht, 1991, which led to the 1992 Maastricht Treaty

Delors became the President of the European Commission in January 1985. During his presidency, he oversaw important budgetary reforms and laid the groundwork for the introduction of a single market within the European Community. It came into effect on 1 January 1993 and allowed the free movement of persons, capital, goods, and services within the Community.

Delors also headed the Committee for the Study of Economic and Monetary Union, widely known as the Delors Committee, that in early 1989 proposed the creation of a new currency—the euro—to replace individual national currencies. This was achieved in the 1992 Maastricht Treaty.

In opposition to the strident neoliberalism of US president Ronald Reagan (1981–1989) that dominated the American political agenda, Delors promoted an alternative interpretation of capitalism that embedded it in the European social structure. He synthesized three themes. First, from the left came support for the redistribution of wealth and protection of the weakest. Second, a neo-mercantilist approach was designed to maximize European industrial output. And the third was reliance on the marketplace. His emphasis on the social dimension of Europe was and remains central to a strong narrative that became a key element of the self-identification of the European Union.

The Delors presidency is considered to have been the apex of the European Commission's influence on European integration.

== Post-presidency ==
Delors had a longstanding interest in education. As the initiator of a French law in 1971 (la formation professionnelle continue, FPC) requiring firms to set aside part of their profits for educational opportunities for their employees, he also chaired a UNESCO Commission on Education for the Twenty-first Century from 1993 to 1996, whose final report was published as Learning: the Treasure Within. This work continues to have a significant influence on discourse on lifelong learning, forming the conceptual foundation for both the Canadian Composite Learning Index as well as the European Lifelong Learning Indicators (ELLI) project.

In 1994, members of the French Socialist Party attempted to persuade Delors to run for president of France. Polls showed that he would have a very good chance of defeating either of the main conservative contenders, Prime Minister Édouard Balladur and Mayor of Paris Jacques Chirac. However Delors declined to run and the eventual Socialist nominee, Lionel Jospin, was defeated in the 1995 presidential election by Jacques Chirac.

Delors founded the Paris-based, centre-left think tank Notre Europe in 1996 and remained one of its presidents for the rest of his life. He was president of the Conseil de l'emploi, des revenus et de la cohésion sociale, and an honorary member of both the Institut Aspen France and the Club of Rome.

On 15 September 2010, Delors supported the new initiative Spinelli Group, which was founded to reinvigorate the striving for federalization of the European Union. Other prominent supporters include Daniel Cohn-Bendit, Guy Verhofstadt, Sylvie Goulard, Andrew Duff, and Elmar Brok. In 2010, Delors was the first to be given the Leonardo European Corporate Learning Award.

In 2012, Delors stated in the Handelsblatt newspaper that "If the British cannot support the trend towards more integration in Europe, we can nevertheless remain friends, but on a different basis. I could imagine a form such as a European economic area or a free-trade agreement."

On 25 June 2015, Donald Tusk announced that Delors would become the third person to have the title of Honorary Citizen of Europe bestowed upon them, in recognition of "his remarkable contribution to the development of the European project".

In March 2024, Delors was posthumously given a "Special Recognition" award at The Parliament Magazine's annual MEP Awards, in recognition of his contributions towards the European project, to mark the awards' 20th anniversary.

== Personal life and death ==
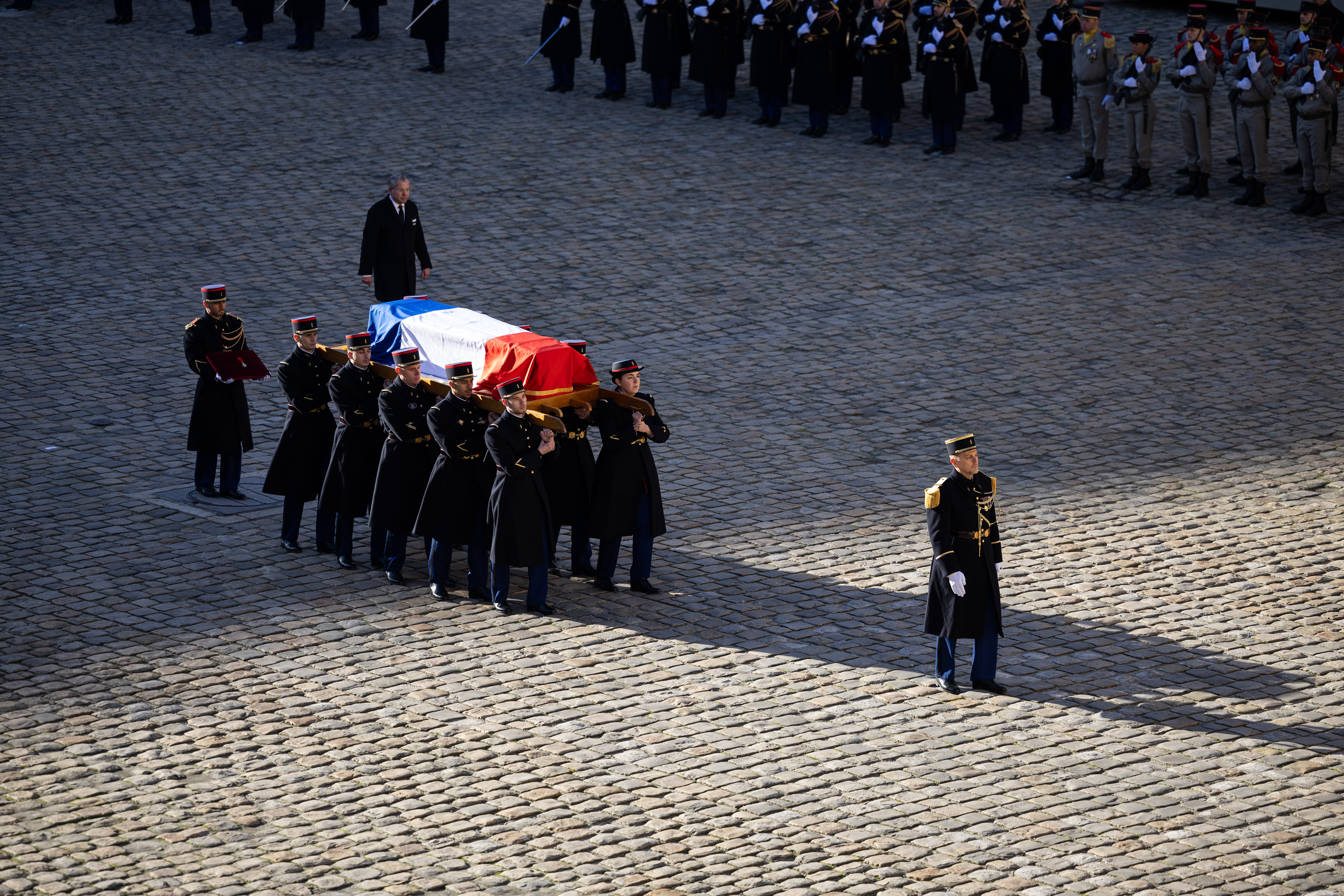
Delors's casket being carried through the courtyard of the Invalides on 5 January 2024

Delors was married to Marie Lephaille until her death in 2020. They had a daughter, Martine Aubry, who served as First Secretary of the Socialist Party from 2008 to 2012, and a son, Jean-Paul Delors, who was a journalist and died aged 29 in 1982 from leukaemia.

Delors died in his sleep at his home in Paris, on 27 December 2023, aged 98. He was honored with a state funeral at the Hôtel des Invalides in Paris on 5 January in the presence of political figures from all over Europe before his burial alongside his wife and his son at the Fontaine-la-Gaillarde cemetery.

== Awards ==
- 1990: Franklin D. Roosevelt Freedom Medal for Freedom of Speech.
- 1998: UEFA President's Award.
- 1999: Member of the Royal Academy of Science, Letters and Fine Arts of Belgium.
- 2005: Pax Christi International Peace Award.
- 2015: Honorary Citizen of Europe.
- 2024: Special Recognition 20th Anniversary Award at The Parliament Magazine's MEP Awards.

== Honours ==
- Estonia: Grand Cross with Collar of the Order of the Cross of Terra Mariana
- France: Commander of the Legion of Honour (2005; previously appointed Officer in 1999)
- Germany: Medal of the Order of Merit of Baden-Württemberg

== Selected works ==
- Delors, Jacques; Arnaud, Jean-Louis (2004). Mémoires. Paris: Plon. ISBN 978-2-259-19292-7.

== See also ==
- Economic and Monetary Union of the European Union
- "No. No. No." (Margaret Thatcher)

Political offices
Preceded by René Monory	Minister of Finance; 1981–1984	Succeeded by Pierre Bérégovoy
Preceded by François-Xavier Ortoli; Edgard Pisani	French European Commissioner; 1985–1995; Served alongside: Claude Cheysson, Christiane Scrivener	Succeeded by Édith Cresson; Yves-Thibault de Silguy
Preceded by Gaston Thorn	President of the European Commission; 1985–1995	Succeeded by Jacques Santer
Academic offices
Preceded by Margaret Thatcher	Speaker at the College of Europe Opening Ceremony; 1989	Succeeded by Richard von Weizsäcker
