= Banco de Portugal =

Central Bank of Portugal

Banco de Portugal (Bank of Portugal)

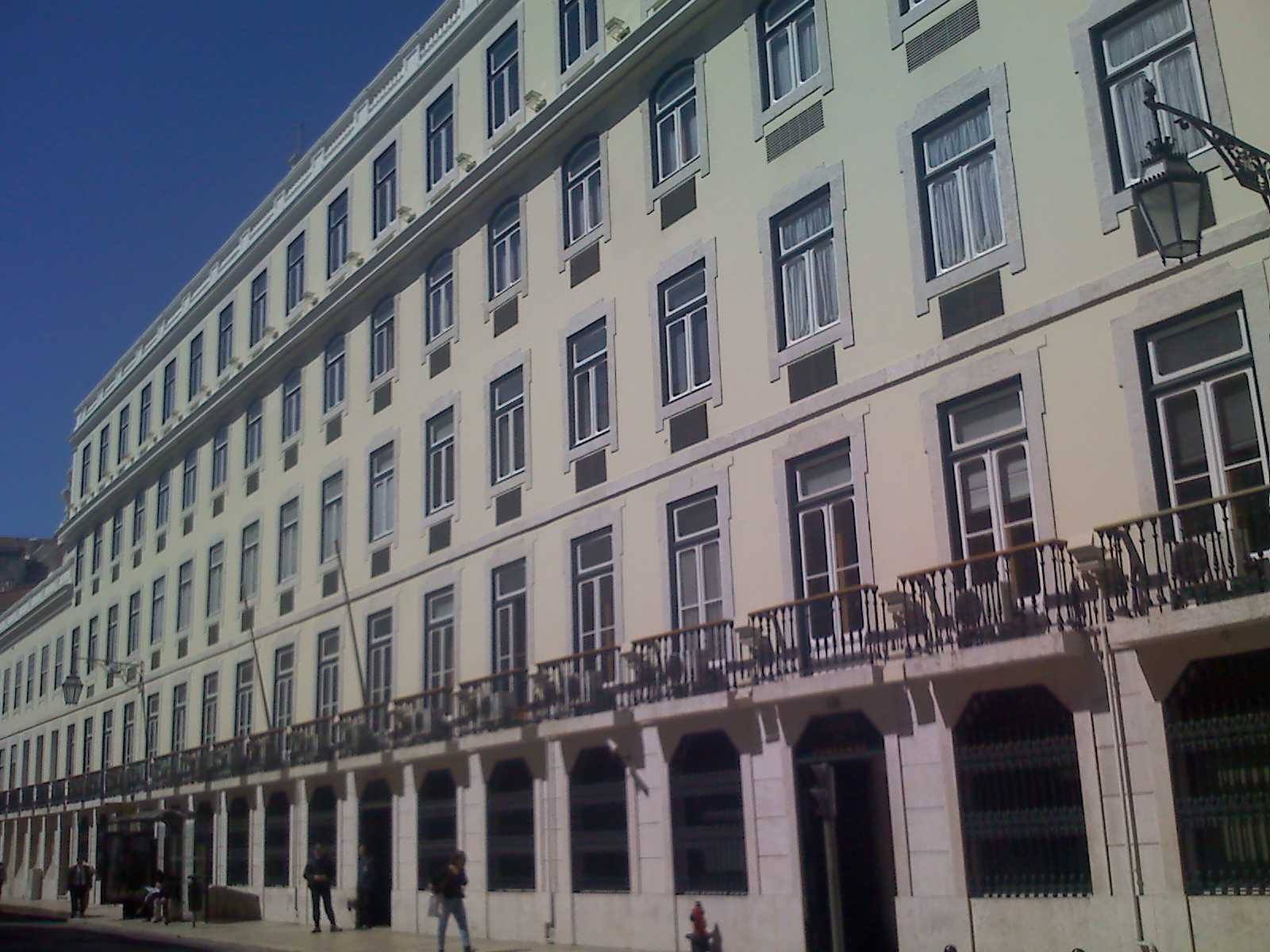
- Central bank of: Portugal
- Headquarters: Lisbon
- Coordinates: 38.708729°N 9.138148°W
- Established: 19 November 1846; 179 years ago
- Ownership: 100% state ownership
- Governor: Álvaro Santos Pereira
- Reserves: 11 405 million USD
- Preceded by: Banco de Lisboa; Companhia de Confiança Nacional
- Succeeded by: European Central Bank (1999)^{1}
- Website: www.bportugal.pt/en
- ^{1} The Bank of Portugal still exists but many functions have been taken over by the ECB.

The Banco de Portugal (Portuguese pronunciation: [ˈbɐ̃ku ðɨ puɾtuˈɣal], lit. 'Bank of Portugal') is the national central bank for Portugal within the Eurosystem. It was the Portuguese central bank from 1846 to 1998, issuing the escudo. It was founded by royal charter in 1846, during the reign of Queen Maria II of Portugal, by a merger of the Banco de Lisboa, the first bank founded in Portugal, and insurer Companhia Confiança Nacional.

The bank has branch offices in Castelo Branco, Coimbra, Évora, Faro, Funchal, Leiria, Porto (Caixa Filial) and Viseu.

In addition to its monetary role, the Banco de Portugal is also a financial supervisory authority. In that capacity, it increasingly implements policies set at the European Union level. It is the national competent authority for Portugal within European Banking Supervision. It is a voting member of the Board of Supervisors of the European Banking Authority (EBA). It is Portugal's designated National Resolution Authority and plenary session member of the Single Resolution Board (SRB). It is also a member of the European Systemic Risk Board (ESRB).

== History ==
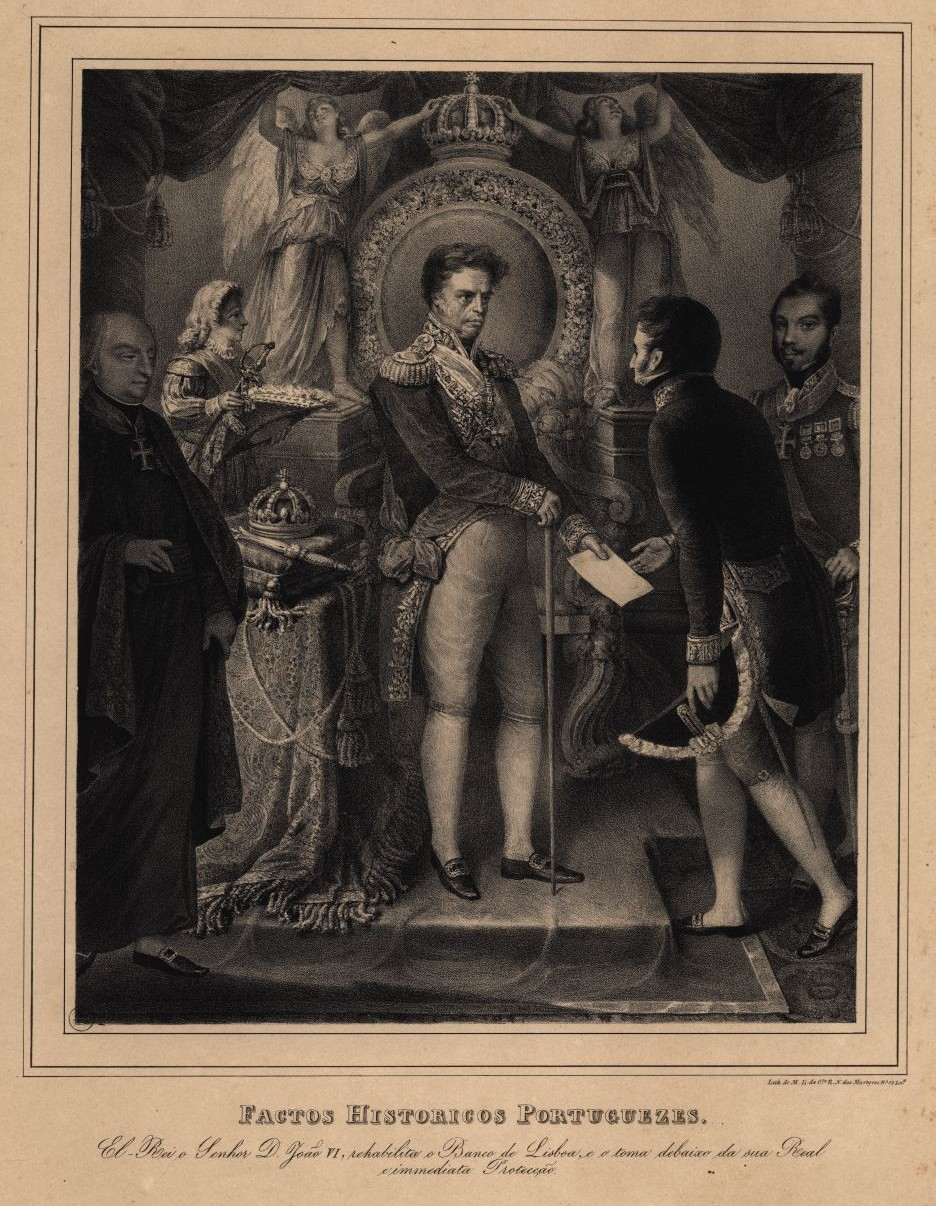
The Banco de Portugal is the successor to the Banco de Lisboa, the first bank established in Portugal.

=== Foundation ===
Queen Maria II of Portugal established the bank by royal charter on 19 November 1846 to act as a commercial bank and issuing bank. It came about as the result of a merger of the Banco de Lisboa, the first bank founded in Portugal, and the Companhia de Confiança Nacional, an investment company specialised in the financing of the public debt.

The bank was designated by the Portuguese Crown as the emitter of legal tender, at the time the Portuguese real, which it continued producing until 1911.

=== Republic ===
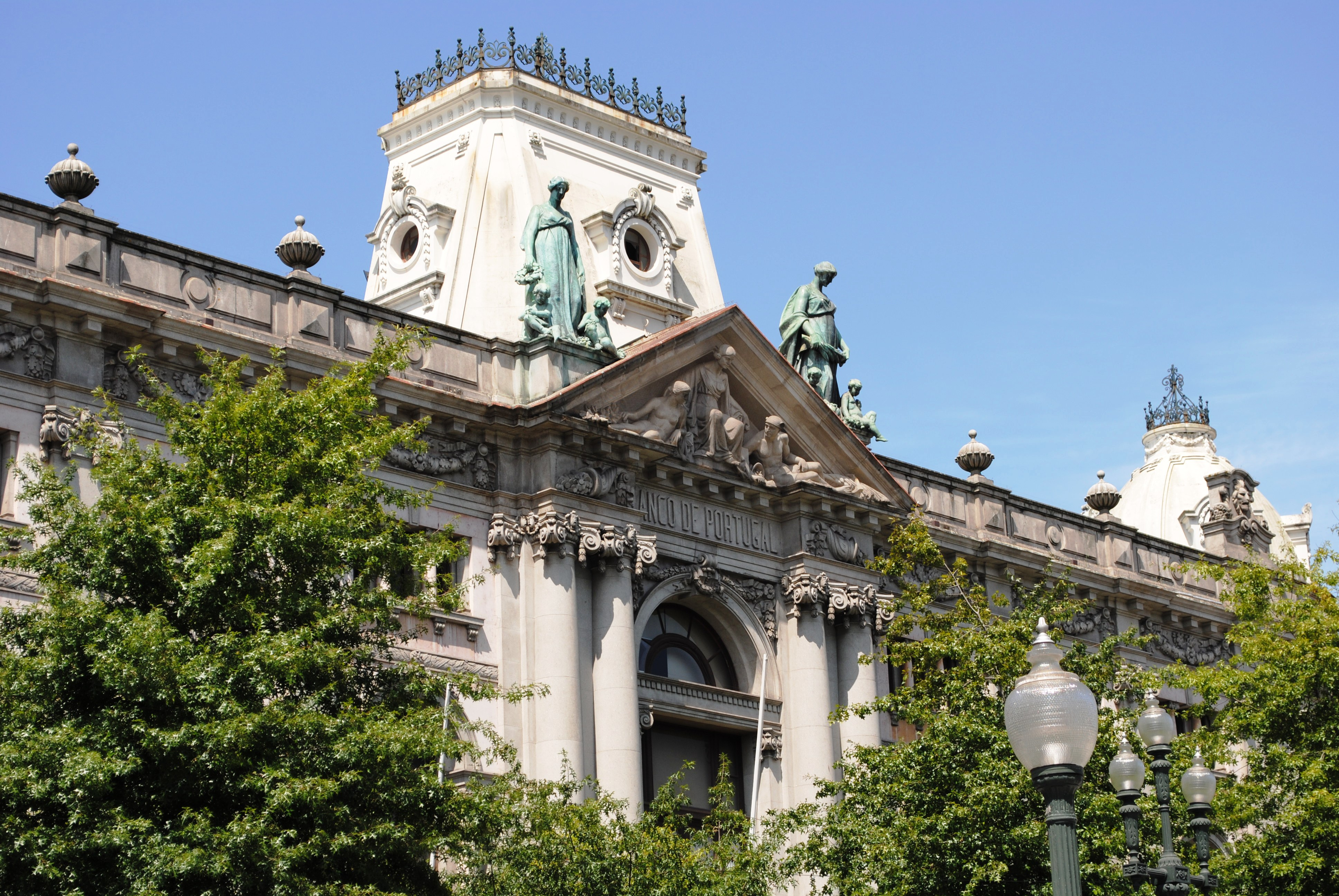
The Banco de Portugal building on the Avenida dos Aliados in Porto.

Following the Implementation of the Republic in 1910, the Banco de Portugal began to emit the Portuguese Escudo.

In 1932, the bank established the Biblioteca do Banco de Portugal, one of the most significant private libraries in Portugal.

In 1946, the institution was bestowed the honor of Grand Cross of the Order of Christ by the President of Portugal.

During the Estado Novo, the bank pursued a vigorous policy of gold acquisition starting in 1957, which has contributed towards Portugal's present-day status of having the 14th largest gold reserve in the world.

=== Nationalization ===
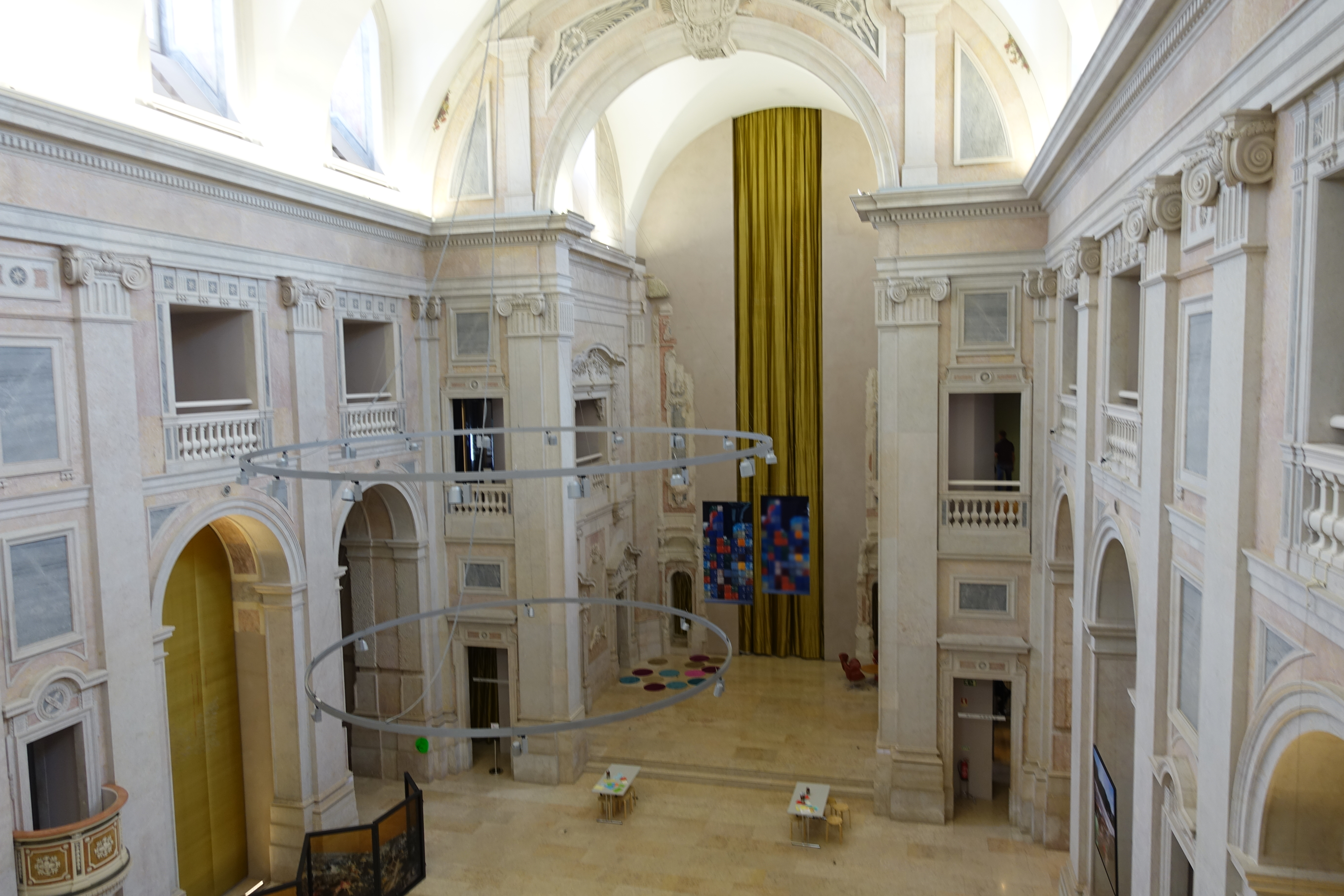
The Museu do Dinheiro (Museum of Money) at the Banco de Portugal's headquarters in Lisbon's Baixa.

Following its nationalisation in September 1974 and its new Organic Law (1975), the Banco de Portugal was, for the first time, responsible for the supervision of the banking system.

It is an integral part of the European System of Central Banks, which was founded in June 1998.

The Banco de Portugal ceased emission of the Portuguese Escudo in 1999, with the country's adoption of the Euro.

=== Contemporary ===
In 2013, the bank announced that it would pay €359 million in dividends, referring to the year of 2012.

In 2014, the bank announced that it would pay €202 million in dividends, referring to the year of 2013, representing a steep decline in comparison to 2012.

In August 2014, Banco de Portugal announced it was restructuring Portugal's second biggest bank, Banco Espírito Santo, by splitting the bank in two. During the bank restructure, one of the lenders, Oak Finance, had its loan liabilities remain with Banco Espírito Santo. This triggered a lawsuit from a group of investors including: hedge funds and the New Zealand Superannuation Fund.

== Governors ==
The Banco de Portugal branch in Braga.

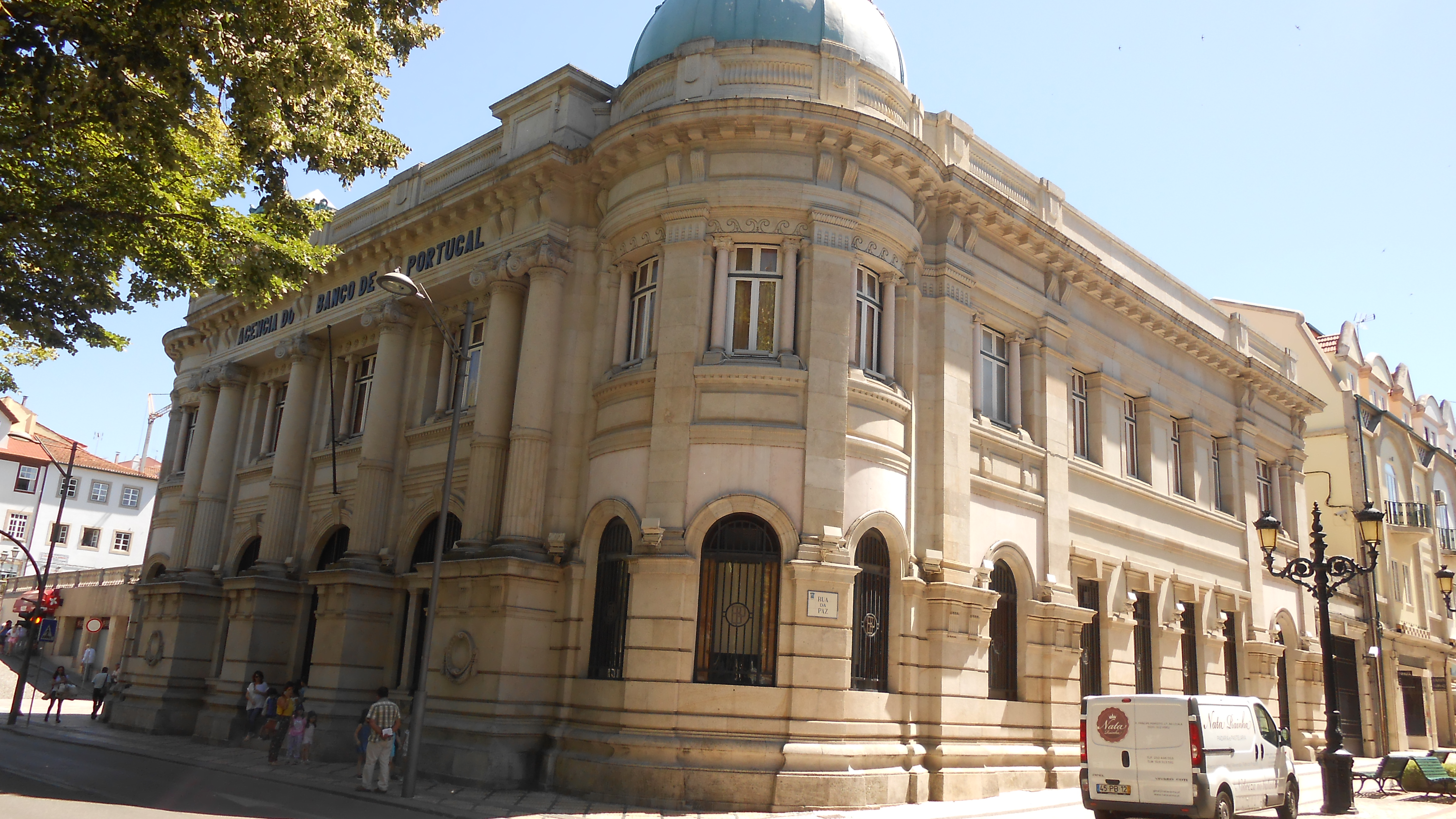
Branch in Viseu.

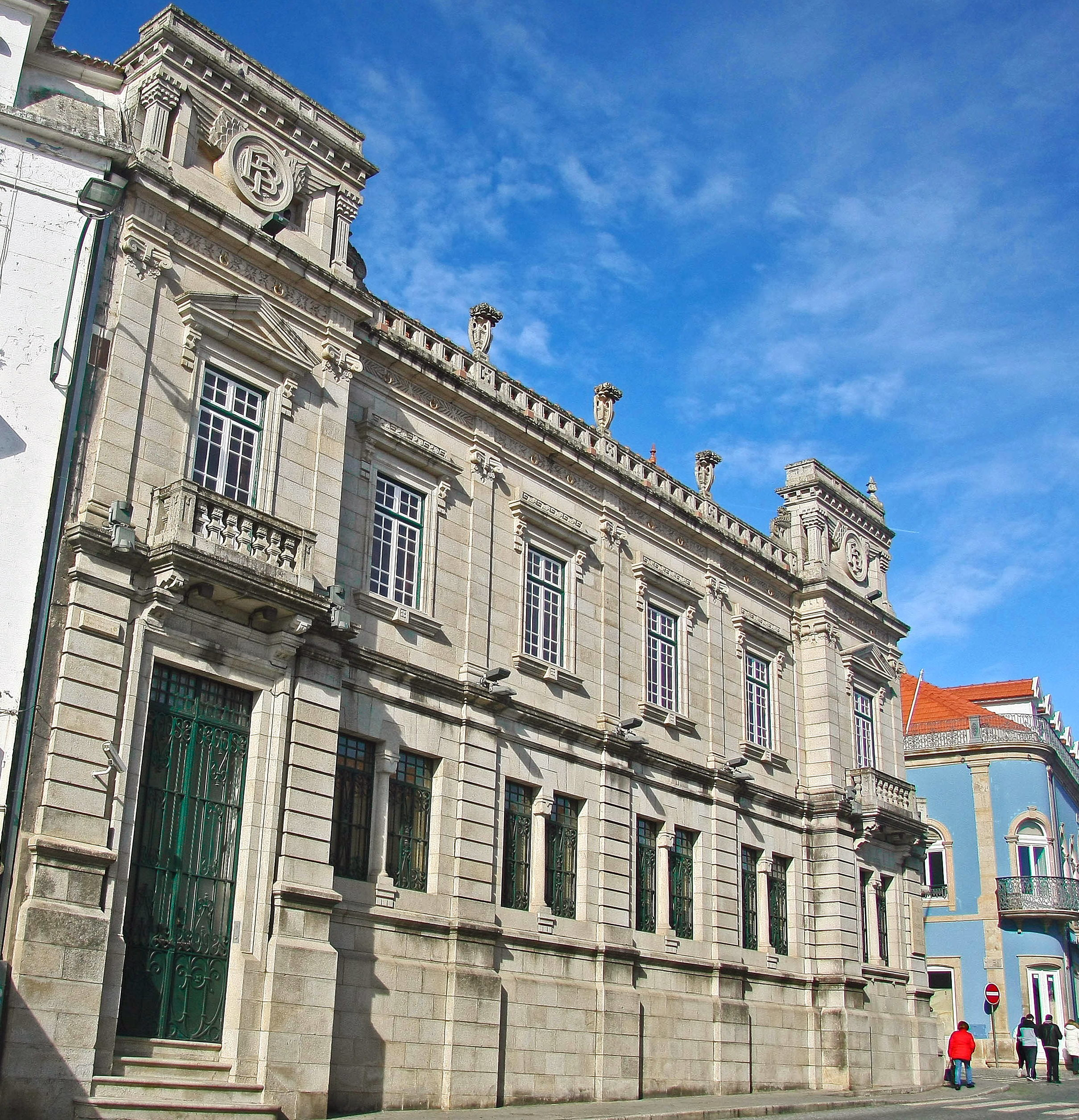
Branch in Castelo Branco.

Branch in Coimbra.

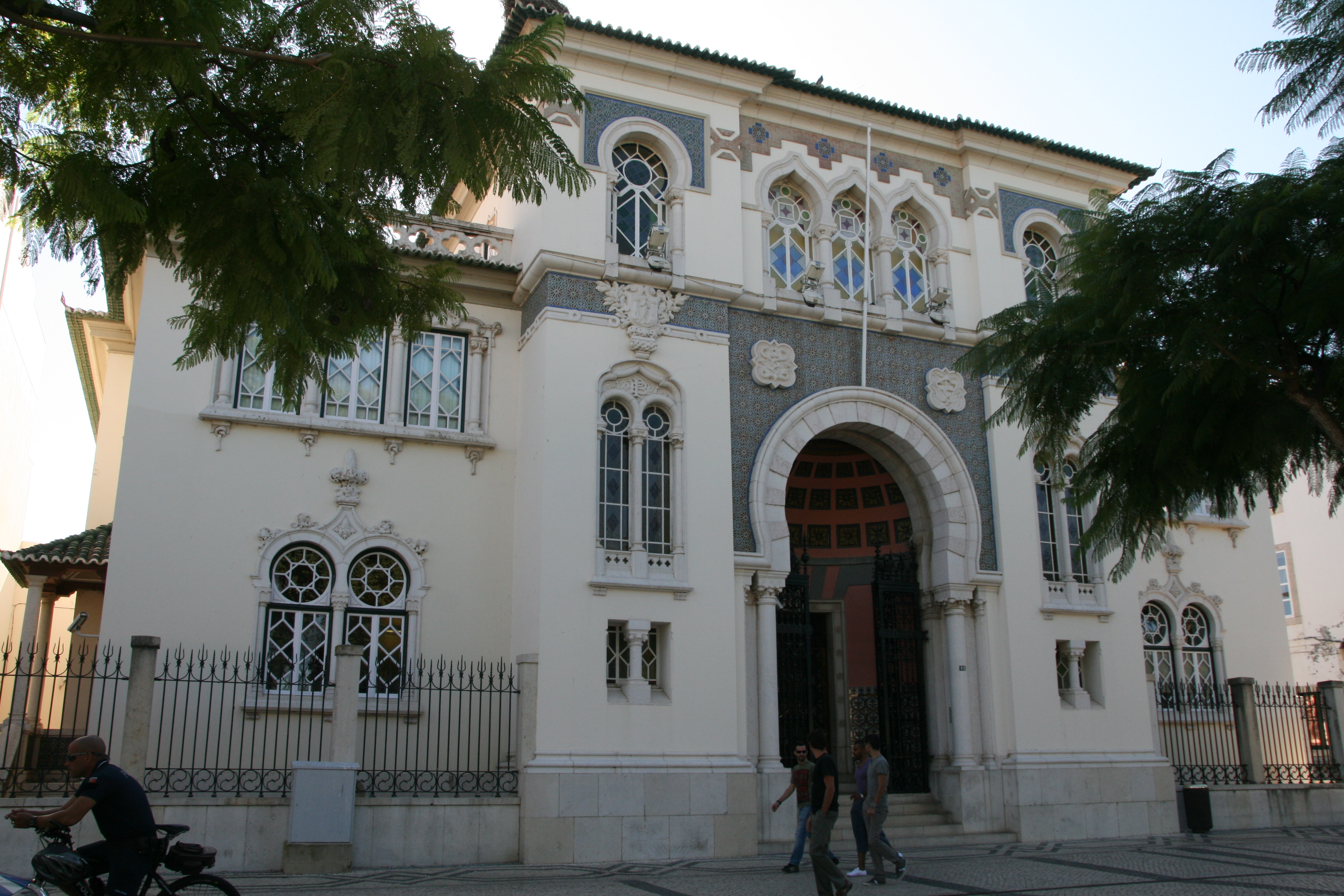
Branch in Faro.

Branch in Évora

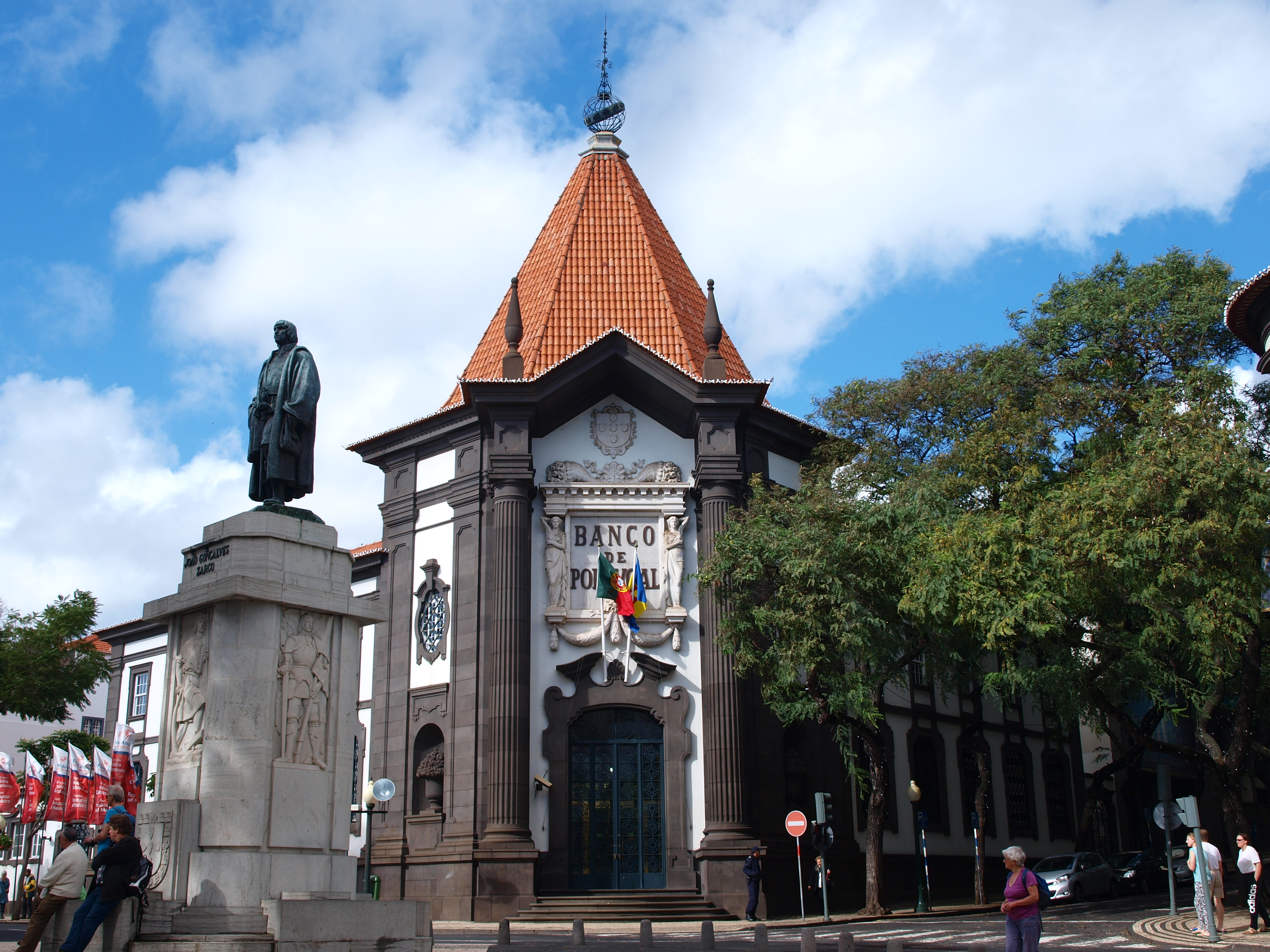
Branch in Funchal.

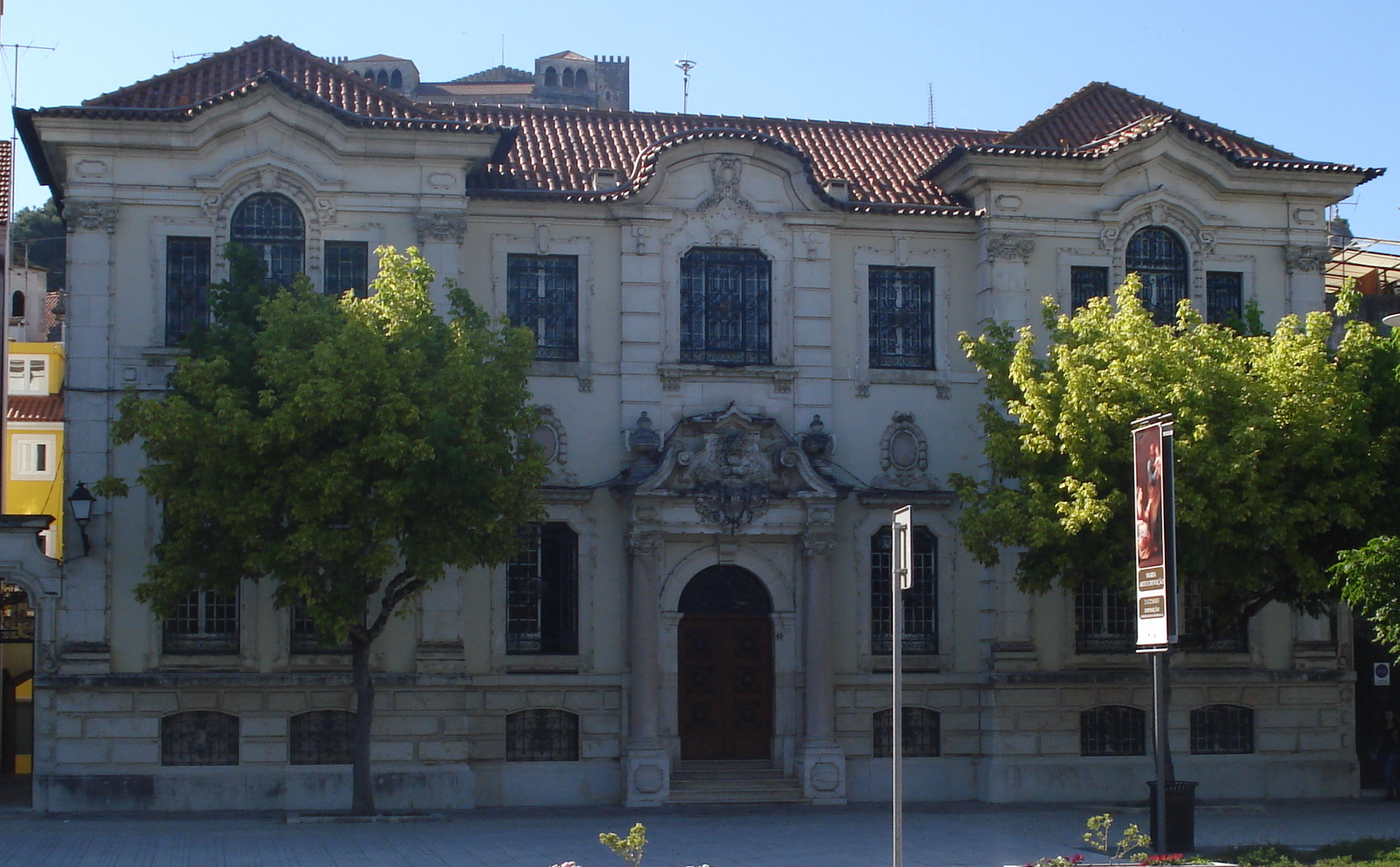
Branch in Leiria.

Prior to 1887, the Banco de Portugal was governed by a chairman of the board. Since then, the administration has been entrusted to the governor of the Banco de Portugal. Central bank governors are proposed by the finance minister and nominated by the cabinet for a five-year term and can be reappointed once.

#	Name	Portrait	Term
1st	António Augusto Pereira de Miranda		1887–1891
2nd	Pedro Augusto de Carvalho		1891–1894
3nd	Júlio de Vilhena		1895–1907
4th	José Adolfo de Mello e Sousa		1907–1910
5th	Inocêncio Camacho		1911–1936
Between 1936 and 1957, the Banco de Portugal operated without a governor.
6th	Rafael da Silva Neves Duque		1957–1963
7th	António Pinto Barbosa		1966–1974
8th	Manuel Jacinto Nunes		1974–1975
9th	José da Silva Lopes		1975–1980
10th	Manuel Jacinto Nunes		1980–1985
11th	Vítor Constâncio		1985–1986
12th	Tavares Moreira		1986–1992
13th	Luís Miguel Couceiro Pizarro Beleza		1992–1994
14th	António José Fernandes de Sousa		1994–2000
15th	Vítor Constâncio		2000–2010
16th	Carlos da Silva Costa		2010–2020
17th	Mário Centeno		2020–2025
18th	Álvaro Santos Pereira		2025–

== See also ==
- Economy of Portugal
- Portuguese escudo, the former currency of Portugal
- Alves dos Reis
- List of central banks
- List of financial supervisory authorities by country
