= European Monetary System =

Organization established in 1979 under the Jenkins European Commission

The European Monetary System (EMS) was a multilateral adjustable exchange rate agreement in which most of the nations of the European Economic Community (EEC) linked their currencies to prevent large fluctuations in relative value. It was initiated in 1979 under then President of the European Commission Roy Jenkins as an agreement among the Member States of the EEC to foster monetary policy co-operation among their central banks for the purpose of managing inter-community exchange rates and financing exchange market interventions.

The EMS functioned by adjusting nominal and real exchange rates, thus establishing closer monetary cooperation and creating a zone of monetary stability. As part of the EMS, the EEC established the first European Exchange Rate Mechanism (ERM) which calculated exchange rates for each currency and a European Currency Unit (ECU): an accounting currency unit that was a weighted average of the currencies of the 12 participating states. The ERM let exchange rates to fluctuate within fixed margins, allowing for some variation while limiting economic risks and maintaining liquidity.

The European Monetary System lasted from 1979 to 1999, when it was succeeded by the Economic and Monetary Union (EMU) and exchange rates for Eurozone countries were fixed against the new currency the Euro. The ERM was replaced at the same time with the current Exchange Rate Mechanism (ERM II).

== History ==
=== Background, 1960 to 1971 ===
The origins of the EMS can be traced back to the end of 1960 when the Heads of the member states of the EEC, known as the European Council today, met in The Hague and agreed to begin moving toward the goal of a single European economy. In 1969, the European Council decided to create an economic and monetary union to be implemented by 1980.

=== 1972: the Werner Report is published and EEC countries peg their currencies ===
A group of experts, led by the Prime Minister and Minister of Finance of Luxembourg, Pierre Werner, met and produced the Werner Report, which was published on 8 October 1970 and outlined the structure and function of the EMS. On the basis of the Werner Report, the EEC began moving to a single economy in three stages. The final stage economy was to have a fixed exchange rate but no single currency. After the abandonment of the Bretton Woods system in 1971, the EEC took action. In October 1972, the EEC's Paris summit adopted the recommendations of the Werner Report and, as a result, the EEC currencies were adjustably pegged to one another in a scheme known as the snake in the tunnel. The currency snake established a single currency fluctuation band of +/-2.25%, however Italy left the snake already in 1973.

=== The EMS is created ===
At a meeting of the EEC in Brussels on 5 December 1978, French President Valéry Giscard d'Estaing and German Chancellor Helmut Schmidt successfully championed the EMS, which was implemented via resolution at the meeting. The EMS officially entered into force on 13 March 1979 with the participation of eight Member States (France, Denmark, Belgium, Luxembourg, Ireland, Netherlands, Germany and Italy).

=== Creation of the European Currency Unit ===
European currency exchange rate stability has been one of the most important objectives of European policymakers since the Second World War. Between 1982 and 1987, European currencies displayed a range of stable and unstable behavior. For example, the Dutch guilder remained quite stable with respect to the Mark, the Italian lira exhibited a sharp downward trend throughout the life of the EMS, and the French franc, the Belgian franc, the Danish krone and the Irish pound all escaped trends of successive devaluations to emerge more stable. At the same time that the EMS was created, the Council of the European Union Ministers created a new monetary unit, the European Currency Unit (ECU). The ECU was the official monetary unit of the EMS, but it was purely a composite accounting unit, not a real currency. The ECU's value was based on the weighted average of a basket of 12 European currencies; the Austrian schilling, Belgian franc, German mark, Spanish peseta, French franc, Finnish markka, Greek drachma, Irish pound, Italian lira, Luxembourgish franc, Dutch guilder, and Portuguese escudo. The exchange rates for member nations' currencies were based on their value relative to the ECU.

=== German monetary policy dominates ===
The EMS was similar to the Bretton Woods system, in that it pegged member currencies within a fluctuation band. Furthermore, the EMS came to be 'de facto' centered on the Deutschmark similarly to how the Bretton Woods system had been based on the US Dollar. Although no currency was designated as an anchor, the Deutsche Mark and German central bank emerged as the anchor of the EMS. Germany emerged as the dominant player within the EMS, setting its monetary policy largely autonomously while other ERM members attempted to converge on the German standard of the Deutsche Mark, causing a power imbalance within the EMS. German monetary policy dictated the policy of the European Monetary System, because of its strong growth rate and the low-inflation policies of the German central bank. The influence of the US dollar also entailed strong disturbances within the EMS. Eventually, this situation led to dissatisfaction in most countries and was one of the primary forces behind the drive to a monetary union.

=== Changing operating principles and preparing for the Euro ===
The EMS went through two distinct phases. During the first period, from 1979 to 1986, the EMS allowed member countries a certain degree of autonomy in monetary policy by restricting the movement of capital. The second period, from 1987 to 1992, the EMS was more rigid. In 1988, a committee was set up under EEC President Jacques Delors to begin changing the EMS to provide favorable starting conditions for the transition to Economic and Monetary Union (EMU). The Delors plan was a three-stage process that led to a single European currency under the control of a European Central Bank.

=== 1992 crisis ===
The year 1990 saw a crisis in the EMS. The European single market had been created in 1986 with the main goal of removing control on capital movements. Periodic adjustments raised the value of strong currencies and lowered those of weaker ones, and national interest rates were changed to keep the currencies within a narrow range. In early 1990, the European Monetary System was strained by the differing economic policies and conditions of its members, especially the newly reunified Germany, and Britain, which had initially declined to join, subsequently joining in 1990. The opt-out of Denmark from the EMU in 1992 and exchange rate adjustments of the currencies from weaker countries by the EMS also contributed to the crisis.

Speculative attacks on the French franc during the following year led to the Brussels compromise in August 1993 which broadened the fluctuation band from +/-2.25% to +/-15% for all the participating currencies. The German central bank reduced interest rates and the UK and Italy were affected by large capital outflows. In the aftermath of the crisis, Italy and the UK both withdrew from the ERM in September 1992.

According to Barry Eichengreen, there were three primary reasons for the crisis: Italy, Spain and the UK had not brought their inflation rates down to the levels of other EMS members, which contributed to competitive imbalances; rising unemployment (stemming in part from German unification) reduced the credibility of the governments with high unemployment rates and weak public support, which led markets to attack the currencies of those countries; and that The Maastricht Treaty provided the conditions for self-fulfilling speculative attacks.

== Criticism ==
Michael J Artis (1987) assessed the credibility of the EMS, stating that the EMS had low credibility during the first eight years of its history. Artis also states that the system demonstrated its resilience despite working relatively non-smoothly. He also remarked that EMS was supposed to have improved the stability of the intra-EMS bilateral exchange rates but that the improvement was less marked for effective rates when compared to nominal rates and stability weakened with the passage of time.

Another criticism was laid by Paul De Grauwe (1987) about the credibility of the EMS policy. In 1979, when EMS entered into force, GDP growth rate, investment growth rate, the stability of exchange rate, and interest rates declined dramatically. In 1980, there was a rise in unemployment after EMS implementation. Both the average EMS unemployment rate and the inflation differential had a significant effect on EMS credibility. Macroeconomically, small EMS countries experienced larger declines in investment, whereas before the EMS they had experienced relatively faster growth rates.

The EMS did not achieve long-term stability in real exchange rates. This is significant because real exchange rates are more important than nominal exchange rates when it comes to investment, output, export, and import decisions. The EMS only succeeded in reducing short-term changes in bilateral exchange rates and nominal exchange rates. Indeed, inflation rates continued to differ widely among EEC countries. For example, Germany experienced an inflation rate of 3 percent while Italy's inflation rate reached 13 percent.

Both nominal and real interest rates increased substantially after 1979 and EMS provided little benefit to its members in terms of monetary and financial stability. Furthermore, there was not enough cooperation among the member states to fully realize the potential benefits of the EMS. The smaller EMS economies such as Belgium, Denmark, and Ireland possessed short-term credibility but lack of long-term credibility. On the other hand, Germany and the Netherlands had the most long-term credibility, due to their low inflation records.

Additionally, Axel A. Weber (1991) claims that the EMS was a de facto Deutsche Mark zone. Moreover, it was often called "tying one's hands" because the policy adopted a fixed exchange rate which had short-run effects. The German central bank independently chose its monetary policy whilst all remaining EMS member countries' hands were tied on monetary policy and they were simply forced to target their exchange rates to the German mark.

== See also ==
- Programme commun
- European Unit of account
- List of currencies in Europe
- Eurosystem
- History of the Euro
- Fixed Exchange rate
