= European Monetary Cooperation Fund =

Economic monetary regulation for EU

The European Monetary Cooperation Fund (EMCF) was a fund established in April 1973 by members of the European Economic Community (EEC) to ensure concerted action for a proper functioning of the Community exchange system. The EMCF was located in Luxembourg. The decision-making body, the Board of Governors, was composed of the governors from the EEC countries' central banks. In contrast to what its name indicates, the fund did not hold any paid-in capital.

The concerted action tasks attributed to the fund were:

- the progressive narrowing of the margins of fluctuation of the Community currencies against each other;
- interventions in Community currencies on the exchange markets;
- settlements between Central Banks leading to a concerted policy on reserves.

This exchange rate system, also called 'the snake', followed the Snake in the tunnel after Nixon's decision to let the dollar float freely. In 1979 the European Monetary System (EMS) was established and replaced 'the snake' and the EMCF took charge of the same tasks within the European Monetary Systems' European Exchange Rate Mechanism (ERM).

It was dissolved in January 1994 and succeeded by the European Monetary Institute which was later replaced by the European Central Bank.

== See also ==
- European Stability Mechanism
