= List of companies of Luxembourg =

Location of Luxembourg

Luxembourg is a landlocked country in Western Europe. It is bordered by Belgium to the west and north, Germany to the east, and France to the south. Luxembourg is a founding member of the European Union, the OECD, the United Nations, NATO, and Benelux, reflecting its political consensus in favour of economic, political, and military integration. The city of Luxembourg, which is the country's capital and largest city, is the seat of several institutions and agencies of the EU. Luxembourg served on the United Nations Security Council for the years 2013 and 2014, which was a first in the country's history. In 2016 Luxembourgish citizens had visa-free or visa-on-arrival access to 172 countries and territories, ranking the Luxembourgish passport 6th in the world, tied with countries such as Canada and Switzerland.

== Largest firms ==
This list shows firms in the Fortune Global 500, which ranks firms by total revenues reported before March 31, 2017. Only the top five firms (if available) are included as a sample.

| Rank | Image | Name | 2016 revenues (US$M) | Employees | Notes |
|---|---|---|---|---|---|
| 156 | | ArcelorMittal | 56,791 | 198,517 | Multinational steel industrial, formed by the merger of Arcelor Steel and the Mittal Steel Company. Peaked at #28 on the list in 2009 but significant drops in revenues have led to a corresponding drop in position. |

== Notable firms ==
This list includes notable companies with primary headquarters located in the country. The industry and sector follow the Industry Classification Benchmark taxonomy. Organizations which have ceased operations are included and noted as defunct.

Notable companies Status: P=Private, S=State; A=Active, D=Defunct
| Name | Industry | Sector | Headquarters | Founded | Notes | Status | |
|---|---|---|---|---|---|---|---|
| Advanzia Bank | Financials | Banks | Munsbach | 2005 | Bank | P | A |
| Aperam | Basic materials | Iron & steel | Luxembourg City | 2011 | Steel | P | A |
| Arcelor | Basic materials | Iron & steel | Luxembourg City | 2002 | Steel, merged into ArcelorMittal 2006 | P | D |
| ArcelorMittal | Basic materials | Iron & steel | Luxembourg City | 2006 | Steel | P | A |
| Artec 3D | Technology | Technology Hardware & Equipment | Luxembourg City | 2007 | Electronic office equipment | P | A |
| Banque de Luxembourg | Financials | Banks | Luxembourg City | 1920 | Bank | P | A |
| Banque et Caisse d'Épargne de l'État | Financials | Banks | Luxembourg City | 1856 | Bank | P | A |
| Banque Raiffeisen | Financials | Banks | Leudelange | 1926 | Bank | P | A |
| BGL BNP Paribas | Financials | Banks | Luxembourg City | 1919 | Bank | P | A |
| BIP Investment Partners | Financials | Investment services | Luxembourg City | 2000 | Investments, financial services | P | A |
| Cactus | Consumer services | Food retailers & wholesalers | Bereldange | 1900 | Supermarkets | P | A |
| Cargolux | Industrials | Delivery services | Sandweiler | 1970 | Cargo airline | P | A |
| Creos Luxembourg | Utilities | Multiutilities | Strassen | 2009 | Electrical and gas distribution | P | A |
| Central Bank of Luxembourg | Financials | Banks | Luxembourg City | 1998 | Central bank | S | A |
| Centre Hospitalier de Luxembourg | Health care | Health care providers | Luxembourg City | 1975 | Healthcare | S | A |
| Ceratizit | Industrials | Diversified industrials | Mamer | 2002 | Industrial manufacturing | P | A |
| CVC Capital Partners | Financials | Asset managers | Luxembourg City | 1981 | Private equity | P | A |
| Editpress | Consumer services | Publishing | Luxembourg City | 1913 | Publishing | P | A |
| Foyer S.A. | Financials | Full line insurance | Luxembourg City | 1922 | Insurance | P | A |
| General Mediterranean Holding | Conglomerates | - | Luxembourg City | 1979 | Financials, construction, hotels | P | A |
| Genii Capital | Financials | Specialty finance | Howald | 2008 | Investments | P | A |
| Gold & Wood | Consumer goods | Personal products | Luxembourg City | 1995 | Eyewear | P | A |
| KBL European Private Bankers | Financials | Banks | Luxembourg City | 1949 | Bank | P | A |
| Kulczyk Investments | Financials | Investment services | Luxembourg City | 2007 | Investments | P | A |
| Lëtzebuerger Journal | Consumer services | Publishing | Luxembourg City | 1948 | Newspaper | P | A |
| Lionair | Consumer services | Airlines | Luxembourg City | 1988 | Airline, defunct 1990 | P | D |
| Luvanis | Consumer goods | Clothing & accessories | Luxembourg City | 2009 | Luxury brands holding | P | A |
| Luxair | Consumer services | Airlines | Sandweiler | 1962 | Airline | S | A |
| Luxembourg Stock Exchange | Financials | Investment services | Luxembourg City | 1928 | Primary exchange | P | A |
| Luxempart | Financials | Investment services | Leudelange | 1988 | Financial holdings | P | A |
| Millicom | Telecommunications | Fixed line telecommunications | Luxembourg City | 1990 | Telecommunications | P | A |
| ORCO | Financials | Real estate holding & development | Capellen | 1991 | Real estate | P | A |
| P&TLuxembourg | Telecommunications | Fixed line telecommunications | Luxembourg City | 1992 | Telecommunications | S | A |
| Radio Luxembourg | Consumer services | Broadcasting & entertainment | Luxembourg City | 1933 | Radio, defunct 1992 | P | D |
| Regus | Industrials | Business support services | Luxembourg City | 1989 | Workplace design | P | A |
| Reinet Investments | Financials | Investment services | Luxembourg City | 2008 | Investments | P | A |
| Rotarex | Industrials | Industrial machinery | Lintgen | 1922 | Gas valves | P | A |
| RTL Group | Consumer services | Broadcasting & entertainment | Kirchberg | 1920 | Media group | P | A |
| Saint-Paul Luxembourg | Consumer services | Publishing | Luxembourg City | 1848 | Publisher | P | A |
| SES S.A. | Telecommunications | Mobile telecommunications | Betzdorf | 1985 | Satellite operator | P | A |
| Société Nationale de Crédit et d'Investissement | Financials | Banks | Luxembourg City | 1978 | Bank | S | A |
| Société Nationale des Chemins de Fer Luxembourgeois | Industrials | Railroads | Luxembourg City | 1946 | National railway | S | A |
| Strategic Airlines Luxembourg | Consumer services | Airlines | Luxembourg City | 2010 | Charter airline, defunct 2012 | P | D |
| Streamworks International | Consumer services | Broadcasting & entertainment | Luxembourg City | 2006 | Streaming media | P | A |
| Techniques d'Avant Garde | Consumer services | Airlines | Luxembourg City | 1977 | Aviation, hospitality | P | A |
| West Air Luxembourg | Industrials | Delivery services | Bertrange | 2002 | Cargo airline | P | A |

== See also ==
- Economy of Luxembourg
- Business entity types in Luxembourg
