= Economy of Luxembourg =

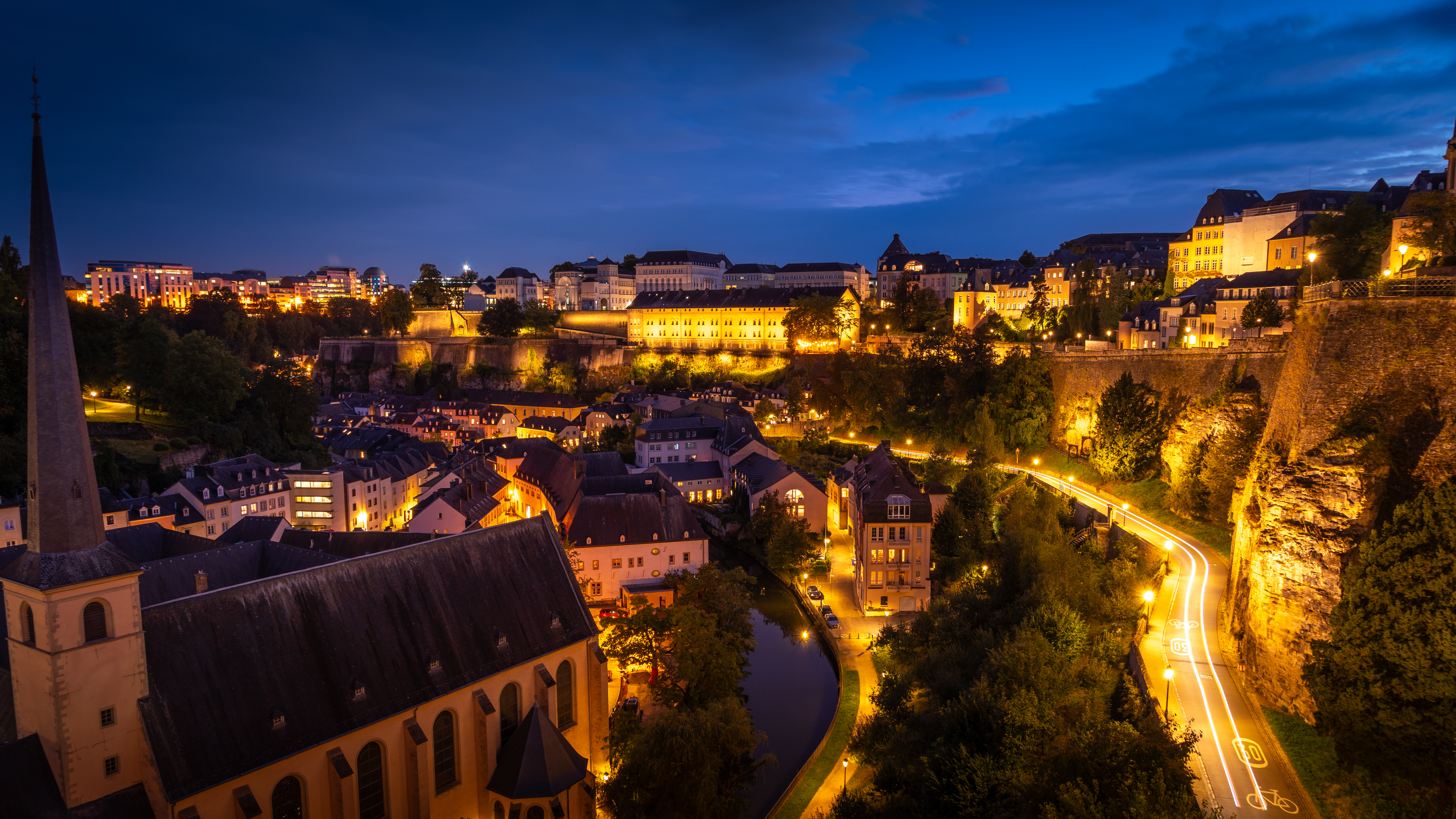
- Currency: Euro (EUR, €)
- Fiscal year: Calendar year
- Trade organisations: EU, WTO and OECD
- Country group: Advanced economy; High-income economy; Welfare state

Statistics
- Population: ▲672,050 (1 January 2024)
- GDP: ▲$96.993 billion (nominal, 2025f); ▲$106.505 billion (PPP, 2025f)
- GDP rank: 74th (nominal, 2024); 101st (PPP, 2024)
- GDP growth: ▼ −1.1% (2023); ▲1.3% (2024f); ▲2.7% (2025f); ▲2.5% (2026f)
- GDP per capita: ▲$141,080 (nominal, 2025f); ▲$154,915 (PPP, 2025f)
- GDP per capita rank: 1st (nominal, 2025); 1st (PPP, 2024)
- GDP by sector: Agriculture: 0.2%; Industry: 10.5%; Services: 80.6%; (2023 est.)
- Inflation (CPI): 2.6% (2025f)
- Population below national poverty line: ▲21.4% at risk of poverty or social exclusion (AROPE, 2023)
- Gini coefficient: ▲30.6 medium (2023, Eurostat)
- Human Development Index: 0.927 very high (2022) (20th); ▼0.839 very high IHDI (22nd) (2022)
- Corruption Perceptions Index: ▲78 out of 100 points (2023) (10th)
- Labour force: ▲335,000 (2023); ▲74.1% employment rate (2023)
- Labour force by occupation: Agriculture: 1.1%; Industry: 20%; Services: 78.9%; (2017 est.)
- Unemployment: ▲5.9% (August 2024); ▲20.4% youth unemployment (August 2024)
- Average gross salary: €6,191 / $7,006 monthly (2024)
- Average net salary: €4,201 / $4,756 monthly (2024)
- Main industries: Banking and financial services, construction, real estate services, iron, metals, and steel, information technology, telecommunications, cargo transportation and logistics, chemicals, engineering, tires, glass, aluminum, tourism, biotechnology

External
- Exports: $100 billion (2022 est.)
- Export goods: Machinery and equipment, steel products, chemicals, rubber products, glass
- Main export partners: Germany 25.6%; Belgium 17.6%; France 14%; Netherlands 5.1%; Italy 4.1%; United Kingdom 4.1%; (2017)
- Imports: $50 billion (2022 est.)
- Import goods: Commercial aircraft, minerals, chemicals, metals, foodstuffs, luxury consumer goods
- Main import partners: Belgium 32%; Germany 24.9%; France 11.1%; United States 5.7%; Netherlands 5.1%; China 4.7%; (2017)
- FDI stock: $50 billion (31 December 2021 est.); Abroad: NA
- Current account: $3.112 billion (2017 est.)
- Gross external debt: $5 trillion (31 March 2022 est.)

Public finance
- Government debt: 15% of GDP (2022); €20 billion (2022)
- Foreign reserves: $1.5 billion (31 December 2021 est.)
- Budget balance: €5 billion surplus (2022); 5% of GDP (2022)
- Revenue: 30% of GDP (2019)
- Spending: 25% of GDP (2019)
- Economic aid: €65 million from European Structural and Investment Funds (2007–2013); €140 million from European Structural and Investment Funds (2014–2020)
- Credit rating: Standard & Poor's: AAA (Domestic); AAA (Foreign); AAA (T&C Assessment); Outlook: Stable; Moody's: Aaa; Outlook: Stable; Fitch: AAA; Outlook: Positive; Scope: AAA; Outlook: Stable
- All values, unless otherwise stated, are in US dollars.

Luxembourg has a developed economy largely dependent on the banking, steel, and industrial sectors. Citizens of Luxembourg enjoy the highest per capita gross domestic product in the world, according to an IMF estimate in 2022. Among OECD nations, Luxembourg has a highly efficient and strong social security system; social welfare expenditure stood at roughly 21.9% of GDP.

Prior to the mid-19th century, Luxembourg was primarily rural and mostly isolated from commerce with neighboring economies. In the late 19th century, Luxembourg's dominant sector was steel industry. Over time, the main economic sector became finance. Due to its reputation for secrecy, it has become an attractive location for individuals and businesses to hold assets for tax avoidance and tax evasion purposes.

== History ==
From 1715 to 1791, Luxembourg was under Austrian rule. At the time, it was predominantly rural. It has been described as largely isolated. It had no road connections to Brussels, which limited its ability to trade with neighbors. Towards the end of the 18th century, long-distance paved roads were constructed, which integrated Luxembourg with neighboring markets.

The first land survey in Luxembourg was conducted after a decree by Maria-Theresa in 1766. The land survey was part of a broader reform effort to abolish certain feudal privileges and encourage more egalitarianism.

Full abolition of feudalism in Luxembourg took place in 1795 when Luxembourg was made part of the French revolutionary regime. It was part of Napoleonic France until 1815 when the Congress of Vienna gave the Eastern part of Luxembourg to Prussia while the remainder formed the Grand Duchy of Luxembourg under Dutch rule. Under Dutch rule, new taxes and customs tariffs were introduced, which harmed commerce in Luxembourg and contributed to it remaining a rural country.

The 1839 Treaty of London divided part of Luxembourg into a province of newly independent Belgium while the remainder became the independent Grand Duchy of Luxembourg. During the first half of the 19th century, Luxembourg remained rural, although there was an emergence of a textile industry. In the second half of the 19th century, Luxembourg developed a steel industry, which would become the dominant sector.

== Sectors ==
The labour productivity level of Luxembourg is one of the highest in Europe. OECD, 2012.

In 2013 the GDP was $60.54 billion of which services, including the financial sector, produced 86%. The financial sector comprised 36% of GDP, industry comprised 13.3% and agriculture only 0.3%.

=== The financial center ===
==== Banking ====
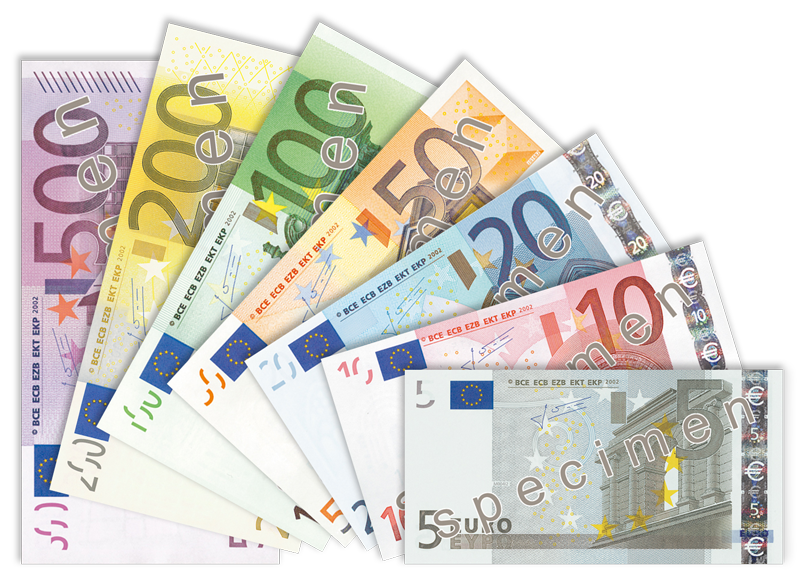
Luxembourg has been part of the eurozone since 1999.

Banking is the largest sector in the Luxembourg economy. In the 2019 Global Financial Centres Index, Luxembourg was ranked as having the 25th most competitive financial center in the world, and third most competitive in Europe after London and Zürich. The country has specialised in the cross-border fund administration business. As Luxembourg's domestic market is relatively small, the country's financial centre is predominantly international. At the end of March 2009, there were 152 banks in Luxembourg, with over 27,000 employees. Political stability, good communications, easy access to other European centres, skilled multilingual staff, a tradition of banking secrecy and cross-border financial expertise have all contributed to the growth of the financial sector. These factors have contributed to a Corruption Perceptions Index of 8.3 and a DAW Index ranking of 10 in 2012; the latter the highest in Europe. Germany accounts for the largest-single grouping of banks, with Scandinavian, Japanese, and major US banks also heavily represented. Total assets exceeded €929 billion at the end of 2008. More than 9,000 holding companies are established in Luxembourg. The European Investment Bank—the financial institution of the European Union—is also located there.

Luxembourg enterprises expected negative investment in 2023 due to slowing economic growth and tighter monetary policy. The net balance of enterprises anticipating an increase in investment minus those expecting a fall is negative at -4%, far lower than the EU average of 14%.

==== Holdings ====
Since the Holding Act of 1929, Luxembourg has been an attractive location for tax avoidance. A network of lawyers, bankers and political elites have since then maintained an infrastructure of regulatory codes, legal expertise and shell companies that enable tax avoidance. Concern about Luxembourg's banking secrecy laws, and its reputation as a tax haven, led in April 2009 to it being added to a "grey list" of nations with questionable banking arrangements by the G20, a list from which it was removed in 2009. This concern has led Luxembourg to modify its tax legislation to avoid conflict with the tax authorities of European Union Members. For example, the classic tax exempt 1929 Holding Company was outlawed 31 December 2010, as it was deemed an illegal state aid by the European Commission.

Nearly 90 percent of companies operating in Luxembourg are foreign. Approximately 40 percent of Luxembourg companies do not engage in any meaningful economic activity in Luxembourg: they just hold assets in Luxembourg.

===== The early beginnings of the financial center =====
Contrary to the belief of a large number of national historians, the financial center of Luxembourg was not a product that simply saw success out of nowhere in the 70s. In their article, Calabrese and Majerus argue that the Holding Law of 1929 (H29) was more than just a historical side note, but rather a foundation that laid the future of the country’s financial success. In essence the law was a legal tool that would help companies in avoiding double taxation on financial assets, mainly by creating a dummy corporations and profiting from the low taxes the country offered for these kinds of companies. The newly introduced Holding regime was successful. Within a span of three years, the capital estimations for the holding companies not only met but exceeded expectations, reaching a total surpassing 2 billion Luxembourg francs. Among the biggest holdings was The Ford Investment Company set up in early 1930. The Holding, enabled by the legislation, could avoid UK tax on the dividends of its subsidiary companies in Europe. This type of company could however, also be used to loan money or make investments, like in the case of Ford by buying factories for European subsidiaries for example. The Law was accompanied by the creation of the Luxembourg Stock Exchange a year earlier, which would constitute another important institution to round off the construction of a national financial center. In the interwar period, the role these Holding companies played as a source of revenue started to materialize. While the discussions on the adoption of the Holding Law saw opposition members argue against it, discussions on later modifications on the Law would not see a strong opposition anymore due to its contribution to the state’s tax revenues.

H29 also enabled the creation of networks and practices. Following its implementation, Luxembourg experienced the establishment of a network involving lawyers, banks, and notaries closely associated with the local political elite. This network successfully developed and maintained an infrastructure comprising regulatory codes, legal expertise, and shell companies, rendering it appealing within the European market for tax avoidance. Additionally, H29 majorly contributed to the establishment of a legal framework that would pave the way for the future use of investment funds, by establishing a positive reputation among investors and proving itself to be a competent key-player on the market. As a result, Luxembourg was chosen in 1963 to list the first and a large part of the Eurobonds on the Luxembourg Stock Exchange, a choice that only could have been made with the awareness of a financial center that could keep up with others such as London, which were also used in the case of Eurobonds.

Consequently, the Holding Law of 1929 had a large and long lasting impact on the construction of a domestic financial place, an impact that should not be disregarded when presenting the economic history of the country.

=== Steel ===
A key event in the economic history of Luxembourg was the 1876 introduction of English metallurgy. The refining process led to the development of the steel industry in Luxembourg and founding of the Arbed company in 1911.

The restructuring of the industry and increasing government ownership in ARBED (31%) began as early as 1974.

In 2002, Arbed merged with Aceralia and Usinor to form Arcelor, which, in 2007, merged with Mittal Steel Company to form ArcelorMittal.

=== Tourism ===
Tourism is an important component of the national economy, representing about 8.3% of GDP in 2009 and employing some 25,000 people or 11.7% of the working population. Despite the current crisis, the Grand Duchy still welcomes over 900,000 visitors a year who spend an average of 2.5 nights in hotels, hostels or on camping sites. Business travel is flourishing representing 44% of overnight stays in the country and 60% in the capital, up 11% and 25% between 2009 and 2010.

=== Agriculture ===
Luxembourg's small but productive agricultural sector is highly subsidized, mainly by the EU and the government. It employs about 1–3% of the workforce. Most farmers are engaged in dairy and meat production. Vineyards in the Moselle Valley annually produce about 15 million litres of dry white wine, most of which is consumed within Luxembourg and also in Germany, France, and Belgium on a lesser scale.

=== Spaceflight and space resource extraction ===
Luxembourg is a member of the European Space Agency where Luxembourg contributed 23 million Euros in 2015.

The world's biggest satellite operator (SES) has its origin and headquarters in Betzdorf, Luxembourg.

In February 2016, the Government of Luxembourg announced that it would attempt to "jump-start an industrial sector to mine asteroid resources in space" by, among other things, creating a "legal framework" and regulatory incentives for companies involved in the industry. By June 2016, announced that it would "invest more than US$200 million in research, technology demonstration, and in the direct purchase of equity in companies relocating to Luxembourg." By April 2017, three space mining corporations had established headquarters in Luxembourg.

Luxembourg's new law took effect in August 2017, ensuring that private operators can be confident about their rights on resources they extract in space. The law provides that space resources can be owned by anyone, not just by Luxembourg citizens or companies."

== Infrastructure ==
=== Transportation ===
Luxembourg has efficient road, rail and air transport facilities and services. The road network has been significantly modernised in recent years with 147 km of motorways connecting the capital to adjacent countries. The advent of the high-speed TGV link to Paris has led to renovation of the city's railway station while a new passenger terminal at Luxembourg Airport has recently been opened. The airport has known a sustained growth in passenger numbers during the last years (2015: 2.7 mio, 2020 : 4 mio expected), and the second stage of expansion is on its way.

Trams have been reintroduced to the capital (first core line operative in end 2017) and further lines are planned, including a tram/light-rail to Esch-sur-Alzette. In 2019, almost all public transport was made free to use for both residents and visitors. The tram reached the airport of Luxembourg in 2025, connecting both the main train station and the airport and thus enabling business travelers to conduct their business in the capital without a car.

=== Energy ===
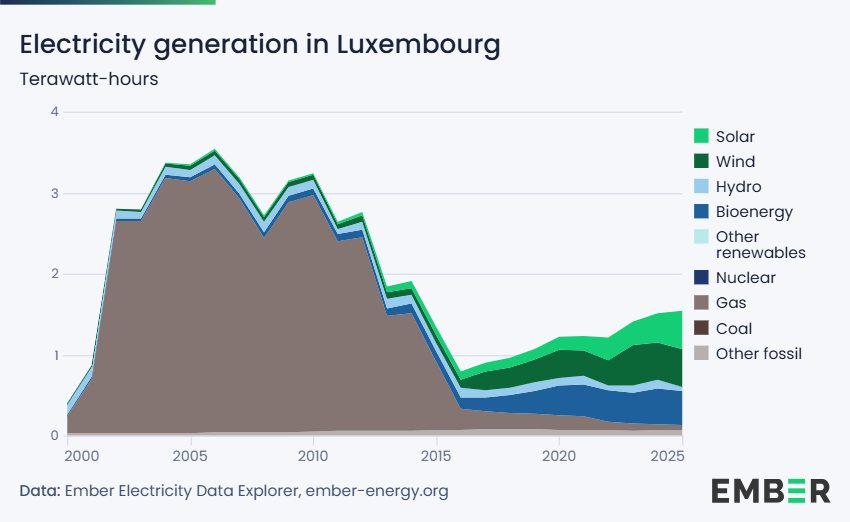
Electricity generation in Luxembourg in terawatt-hours

In 1978, Luxembourg tried to build a 1,200 MW nuclear reactor but dropped the plans after threats of major protests. Luxembourg uses imported oil and natural gas for the majority of its energy generation. The Cattenom Nuclear Power Plant across the border in France's Grand Est region produces more electricity than the entire country of Luxembourg consumes, however, due to the strength of the anti-nuclear movement in Luxembourg, electricity exports directly from France to Luxembourg are hampered by lack of infrastructure.

=== Telecommunications ===
Government policies promote the development of Luxembourg as an audiovisual and communications center. Radio-Television-Luxembourg is Europe's premier private radio and television broadcaster. The government-backed Luxembourg satellite company SES (formerly Société Européenne des Satellites) was created in 1986 to install and operate a satellite telecommunications system for transmission of television programs throughout Europe. The first SES Astra satellite, the 16-channel RCA 4000 Astra 1A, was launched by the Ariane Rocket in December 1988. SES presently [when?] constitutes the world largest satellite services company in terms of revenue.

67% of Luxembourg enterprises use innovative digital technologies. Luxembourg firms choose robots (74%), IoT (43%), and digital platforms (42%), over other digital technologies.

== Macroeconomic statistics ==
Exports of Luxembourg by product category (2019) Chemical products Transportation Machines Mineral products Plastics and rubbers Metals Foodstuffs Precious metals Textiles Instruments Animal products Vegetable products Paper goods Footwear and headwear Miscellaneous Stone and glass Wood products Animal and vegetable bi-products Animal hides Arts and antiques Weapons

In 2022, the sector with the highest number of companies registered in Luxembourg is Finance, Insurance, and Real Estate with 89,748 companies followed by Services and Retail Trade with 31,658 and 6,571 companies respectively.

The following table shows the main economic indicators in 1980–2026. Inflation under 2% is in green.

| Year | GDP (in Bil. US$ PPP) | GDP per capita (in US$ PPP) | GDP (in bil. US$ nominal) | GDP growth (real) | Inflation rate (in Percent) | Unemployment (in Percent) | Government debt (in % of GDP) |
|---|---|---|---|---|---|---|---|
| 1980 | 6.3 | 17,415 | 6.4 | ▲3.2% | ▲6.3% | 0.7% | n/a |
| 1981 | ▲7.0 | ▲19,156 | ▼5.5 | ▲0.8% | ▲8.1% | ▲1.0% | n/a |
| 1982 | ▲7.5 | ▲20,535 | ▼4.6 | ▲1.0% | ▲9.4% | ▲1.3% | n/a |
| 1983 | ▲7.9 | ▲21,741 | ▼4.5 | ▲1.9% | ▲8.7% | ▲1.6% | n/a |
| 1984 | ▲8.6 | ▲23,572 | ▼4.4 | ▲4.7% | ▲5.6% | ▲1.7% | n/a |
| 1985 | ▲9.4 | ▲25,629 | ▲4.5 | ▲5.6% | ▲4.1% | 1.7% | n/a |
| 1986 | ▲10.5 | ▲28,623 | ▲6.6 | ▲10.0% | ▲0.3% | ▼1.5% | n/a |
| 1987 | ▲11.2 | ▲30,294 | ▲8.2 | ▲4.0% | ▼−0.1% | ▲1.7% | n/a |
| 1988 | ▲12.6 | ▲33,725 | ▲9.3 | ▲8.5% | ▲1.4% | ▼1.5% | n/a |
| 1989 | ▲14.4 | ▲38,104 | ▲9.9 | ▲9.8% | ▲3.4% | ▼1.4% | n/a |
| 1990 | ▲15.7 | ▲41,165 | ▲12.6 | ▲5.3% | ▲3.7% | ▼1.3% | n/a |
| 1991 | ▲17.7 | ▲45,615 | ▲13.7 | ▲8.6% | ▲3.1% | ▲1.4% | n/a |
| 1992 | ▲18.4 | ▲46,862 | ▲15.3 | ▲1.8% | ▲3.2% | ▲1.6% | n/a |
| 1993 | ▲19.6 | ▲49,284 | ▲15.7 | ▲4.2% | ▲3.6% | ▲2.1% | n/a |
| 1994 | ▲20.8 | ▲51,509 | ▲17.5 | ▲3.8% | ▲2.2% | ▲2.7% | n/a |
| 1995 | ▲21.5 | ▲53,093 | ▲20.6 | ▲1.4% | ▲1.9% | ▲3.0% | 10.3% |
| 1996 | ▲22.3 | ▲54,097 | ▼20.5 | ▲1.5% | ▲1.2% | ▲3.2% | ▼10.2% |
| 1997 | ▲24.0 | ▲57,556 | ▼18.4 | ▲5.9% | ▲1.4% | ▲3.3% | ▼10.1% |
| 1998 | ▲25.8 | ▲61,218 | ▲19.3 | ▲6.5% | ▲1.0% | ▼3.1% | ▼9.5% |
| 1999 | ▲28.4 | ▲66,478 | ▲21.1 | ▲8.4% | ▲1.0% | ▼2.9% | ▼8.4% |
| 2000 | ▲31.5 | ▲72,668 | ▲21.2 | ▲8.4% | ▲3.8% | ▼2.4% | ▼7.5% |
| 2001 | ▲33.2 | ▲75,647 | ▲21.4 | ▲3.1% | ▲2.4% | ▼2.2% | ▲7.6% |
| 2002 | ▲34.8 | ▲78,407 | ▲23.6 | ▲3.2% | ▲2.1% | ▲2.5% | ▼7.4% |
| 2003 | ▲36.4 | ▲81,262 | ▲29.7 | ▲2.6% | ▲2.5% | ▲3.3% | 7.4% |
| 2004 | ▲39.0 | ▲85,697 | ▲35.0 | ▲4.2% | ▲3.2% | ▲3.7% | ▲7.8% |
| 2005 | ▲41.2 | ▲89,360 | ▲37.7 | ▲2.5% | ▲3.8% | ▲4.1% | ▲8.0% |
| 2006 | ▲45.0 | ▲96,014 | ▲42.9 | ▲6.0% | ▲3.0% | ▲4.2% | ▲8.2% |
| 2007 | ▲50.0 | ▲105,012 | ▲51.6 | ▲8.1% | ▲2.7% | 4.2% | ▼8.1% |
| 2008 | ▲50.8 | ▲105,035 | ▲58.8 | ▼−0.3% | ▲4.1% | ▼4.1% | ▲14.6% |
| 2009 | ▼49.5 | ▼100,250 | ▼54.4 | ▼−3.2% | ▲0.0% | ▲5.5% | ▲15.3% |
| 2010 | ▲52.0 | ▲103,481 | ▲56.3 | ▲3.8% | ▲2.8% | ▲5.8% | ▲19.1% |
| 2011 | ▲53.6 | ▲104,696 | ▲61.7 | ▲1.0% | ▲3.7% | ▼5.7% | ▼18.5% |
| 2012 | ▲55.5 | ▲105,699 | ▼59.8 | ▲1.6% | ▲2.9% | ▲6.1% | ▲20.8% |
| 2013 | ▲58.2 | ▲108,409 | ▲65.2 | ▲3.2% | ▲1.7% | ▲6.8% | ▲22.4% |
| 2014 | ▲60.8 | ▲110,575 | ▲68.8 | ▲2.6% | ▲0.7% | ▲7.1% | ▼21.9% |
| 2015 | ▲62.7 | ▲111,437 | ▼60.1 | ▲2.3% | ▲0.1% | ▼6.6% | ▼21.1% |
| 2016 | ▲66.5 | ▲115,390 | ▲62.2 | ▲5.0% | ▲0.0% | ▼6.3% | ▼19.6% |
| 2017 | ▲68.6 | ▲116,089 | ▲65.7 | ▲1.3% | ▲2.1% | ▼5.8% | ▲21.8% |
| 2018 | ▲70.9 | ▲117,791 | ▲71.1 | ▲1.6% | ▲2.0% | ▼5.1% | ▼20.9% |
| 2019 | ▲75.3 | ▲122,579 | ▼69.9 | ▲2.7% | ▲1.7% | ▲5.4% | ▲22.3% |
| 2020 | ▲77.0 | ▲122,907 | ▲73.6 | ▼−0.5% | ▲0.0% | ▲6.4% | ▲24.5% |
| 2021 | ▲89.1 | ▲140,411 | ▲86.4 | ▲6.9% | ▲3.5% | ▼5.7% | ▼24.2% |
| 2022 | ▲94.4 | ▲146,289 | ▼80.9 | ▼−1.1% | ▲8.1% | ▼4.8% | ▲24.9% |
| 2023 | ▲98.0 | ▲148,311 | ▲88.8 | ▲0.1% | ▲2.9% | ▲5.2% | ▼24.7% |
| 2024 | ▲100.8 | ▲149,986 | ▲93.3 | ▲0.4% | ▲2.3% | ▲5.8% | ▲26.3% |
| 2025 | ▲104.3 | ▲152,966 | ▲101.1 | ▲0.6% | ▲2.5% | ▲6.0% | ▲27.0% |
| 2026 | ▲109.0 | ▲156,719 | ▲110.4 | ▲1.6% | ▲2.1% | ▼5.9% | ▲28.0% |

== See also ==
- List of companies of Luxembourg
- The Integrated Traffic and Landscape Concept for the Grand Duchy of Luxembourg
- Social welfare in Luxembourg
- Luxembourg for Finance
