= Foyer S.A. =

Insurance company based in Leudelange, Luxembourg

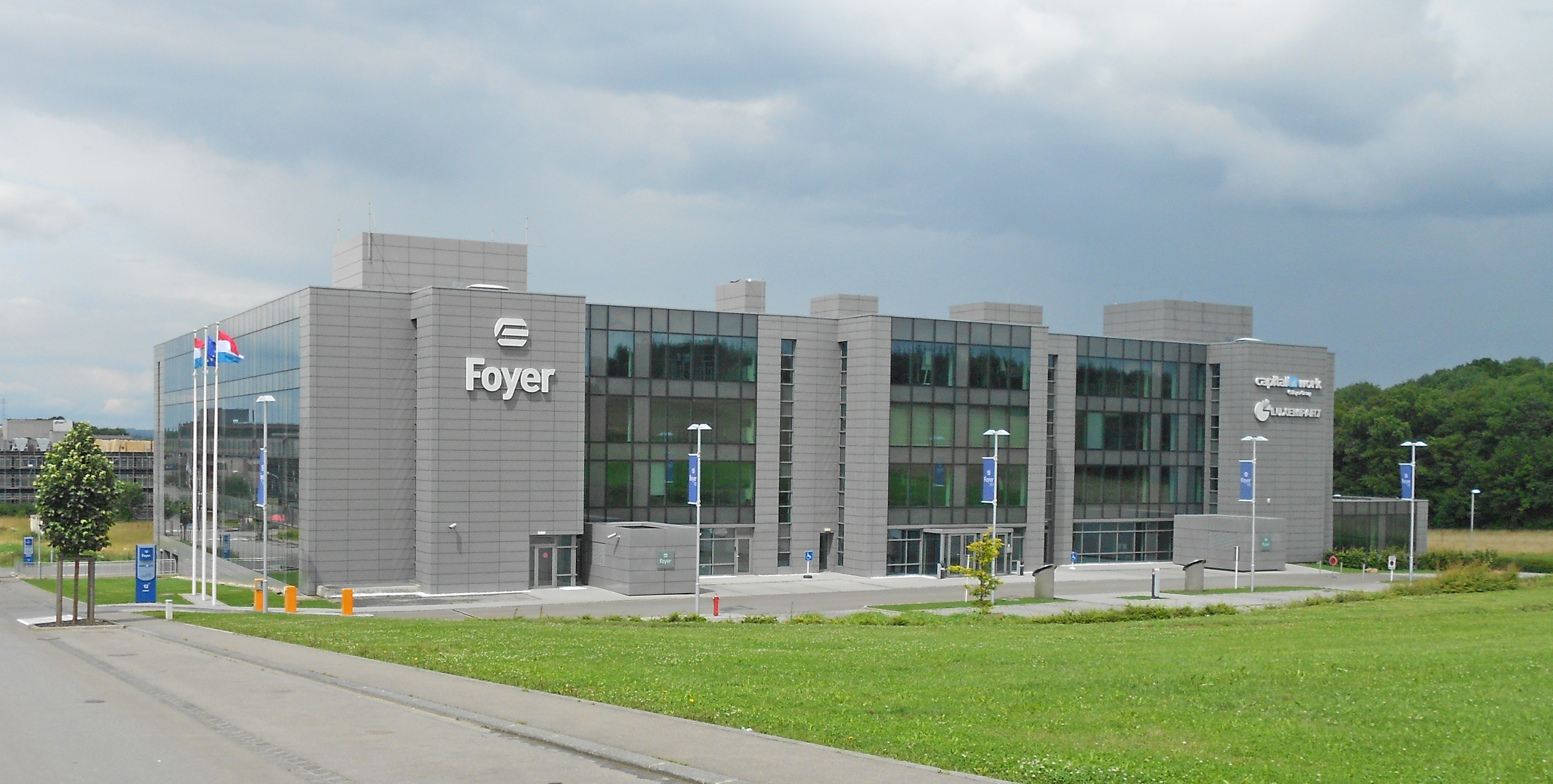
- Type: Société Anonyme
- Traded as: Subsidiary
- Industry: Insurance
- Founded: 28 October 1922
- Founder: Léon Laval, Max Lambert, Joseph Bach and Max Menager
- Fate: Acquired by Luxempart
- Headquarters: Leudelange, Luxembourg
- Key people: Henri Marx (Chairman); François Tesch (Chief Executive Officer)
- Website: www.foyer.lu

Foyer S.A. is an insurance company, based in Leudelange, in south-western Luxembourg.

== History ==
The company was founded in 1922 by Léon Laval, Max Lambert, Joseph Bach and Max Menager as Le Foyer, Compagnie Luxembourgeoise d'Assurances S.A., a name that was changed to 'Foyer' in 2005. Foyer is listed on the Luxembourg Stock Exchange, where it is a smallest of the ten component companies of the main LuxX Index stock market index, and Euronext Brussels.

The company offers services to both individuals and businesses, covering a range of products, including: life insurance, car insurance, home insurance, health insurance, liability insurance, travel insurance, and savings products for individuals; and health insurance, group insurance, and corporate-owned life insurance for businesses.
