= Streamworks International =

Streaming media company

Streamworks International S.A.
- Company type: Private
- Available in: English
- Founded: 2006
- Headquarters: Luxembourg, Luxembourg
- Area served: Worldwide
- Founder: Ray Mia
- Key people: Timur Sardarov (director); Oliver Ripley (director); Ray Mia (Group CEO)
- Industry: Streaming Media
- Employees: 11-50
- Parent: Ocean Group International
- Website: streamworksint.com streamworksinternational.com streamworks.lu
- Launched: 2010

Streamworks International S.A is a privately held company owned by Ocean Group International and headquartered in Luxembourg, Luxembourg, with operational offices located in London, United Kingdom, and New York City, New York, United States.

The streaming media company provides online video through live and on-demand services to several companies, which includes Major League Gaming, The Associated Press, Jamie Oliver, MSN, the International Court of Justice and the United Nations.

== History ==
=== 2006 to 2011 ===
Founded in 2006 by Ray Mia, which went on to become Streamworks International. In June 2010, the company got the backing from Ocean Group International. Their services went live in February 2011.

Jesta Digital, formerly Fox Mobile Entertainment, announced an agreement with Streamworks International for mobile distribution of the Royal Wedding of Catherine Elizabeth Middleton and Prince William Arthur Philip Louis. Streamworks acquired rights from The Associated Press to stream the wedding live and distribute the Video on Demand.

Major League Gaming forms a partnership with Streamworks International in delivering live streams of the 2011 Pro Circuit competitions worldwide. This was a response to adjusting Major League Gaming's delivery infustructure of the live streaming of their competitions.

Streamworks delivers record-breaking audience figures for Major League Gaming's live streaming of the 2011 Pro Circuit video game competition, first at the Anaheim Convention Center, Los Angeles, California, United States with 138,000 concurrent viewers, 181,000 concurrent viewers at the Gaylord Palms Resort & Convention Center, Kissimmee, Florida, United States, and finally, 241,000 concurrent viewers at the Rhode Island Convention Center, Providence, Rhode Island, United States.

Streamworks International announces an ongoing relationship with Jamie Oliver and his Food Revolution, streaming weekly live shows exclusively to US audiences.

The Lawn Tennis Association announced the live streaming of the Davis Cup tie by BNP Paribas between Great Britain and Luxembourg with the association of Streamworks International.

A partnership with World Rally Championships promoter, North One Sport and Streamworks International was formed to offer live streaming of the WRC race of the Rallye de France in Alsace. The project was a pilot with plans for full coverage for races in 2012.

The Associated Press and Streamworks International offers APTN news content to digital publishers as online internet stream.

Elemental Technologies announced a joint solution with Streamworks International to provide The Associated Press Elemental Live products for the real-time streaming of the APTN news content across the internet.

=== 2012 to present ===
An agreement was signed between Streamworks International and Level 3 Communications to use its content delivery network for APTN.

Streamworks International made its Consumer Electronics Show debut in 2012 at the Mandarin Oriental, Paradise, Nevada, United States, demonstrating its technology to members of the media.

Associated Press and Streamworks made the live stream of Whitney Houston's Memorial Service from the New Hope Baptist Church in Newark, New Jersey, available through their APTN Direct premium video service.

The continued partnership between Major League Gaming and Streamworks International brought another record breaking viewership for MLG's 2012 Pro Circuit Spring Championships at the Anaheim Convention Center, Los Angeles, California, United States. Over 4.7 million unique online viewers tuned in during the weekend with concurrent viewers peaking at 437,000 viewers.

Two former Associated Press executives, Markus Ickstadt and Tim Santhouse join Streamworks as part of the streaming technology firm's expansion plans.

Streamworks continued their partnership with Major League Gaming with the broadcast of the MLG's 2012 Pro Circuit Summer Championships at the Greater Raleigh Convention Center, Raleigh, North Carolina, United States.

The United Nations have partnered with Streamworks to launch United Nations Television providing coverage of the 67th session of the General Assembly taking place at the United Nations headquarters in New York City, New York, United States. Content will include live coverage of the Security Council, the General Assembly, press conferences, special events and short-form documentaries produced by the United Nations.

A discussion forum entitled 'The New Live News Paradigm: Anywhere, Any Device' was held at the British Consulate-General in New York City, New York, United States sponsored by Streamworks and the UK Trade & Investment. The event focused on how technology is driving the production, distribution, consumption and commercialization of live news. The panel was led by Merrill Brown, a former editor-in-chief from MSNBC with Roy Sekoff, the president of HuffPost Live at The Huffington Post, Joe Ruffolo, senior vice president of digital media at ABC News, Andrew Heyward the former president of CBS News, and Ray Mia, CEO of Streamworks International.

A new deal between Streamworks International and Associated Press was formed to expand the live news streaming service to Associated Press's AP Video Hub live news service. This allows clients to have access to breaking news events as well as the ability to book and schedule planned live news events on an ad-hoc basis.

BT Sport acquired the television rights to Rio Ferdinand's Manchester United testimonial match with partnership for the game with Streamworks International. The deal between BT and Streamworks International enabled all UK broadband users to view the football match.

== Corporate affairs ==
=== Expansion ===
Streamworks are currently headquartered in Luxembourg, Luxembourg, with operational offices located in London, United Kingdom, and New York City, New York, United States. The company are looking to expand in territories such as Russia, Eastern Europe, the Middle East, and Latin America.

=== Company personnel ===
- Timur Sardarov: Director
- Oliver Ripley: Director
- Ray Mia: Chief Executive Officer
- Rob Peacock: Chief Technical Officer

== Technology ==
Streamworks International uses patented encoding technology on live and on-demand video streams by using video signal processing to optimize video and audio data. This then reduces bandwidth for live video streams, allowing efficient delivery towards end users. The video signal processing happens before compression allowing the technology to be used alongside existing video encoding systems.

Their Universal Delivery Network (uDN) utilizes their own points of presence (PoP) and third-party data centres to achieve delivery of multimedia data globally to multiple content delivery networks (CDNs), mobile network operators, and internet service providers (ISPs).

== Clients and partners ==
Streamworks International's clients and partners include Major League Gaming, Level 3 Communications, Jesta Digital, The Associated Press, North One Sport, The Lawn Tennis Association, Jamie Oliver, MSN, The Daily Telegraph, The Daily Mail, and the United Nations.

== See also ==
- Ocean Group International
