= List of banks in Luxembourg =

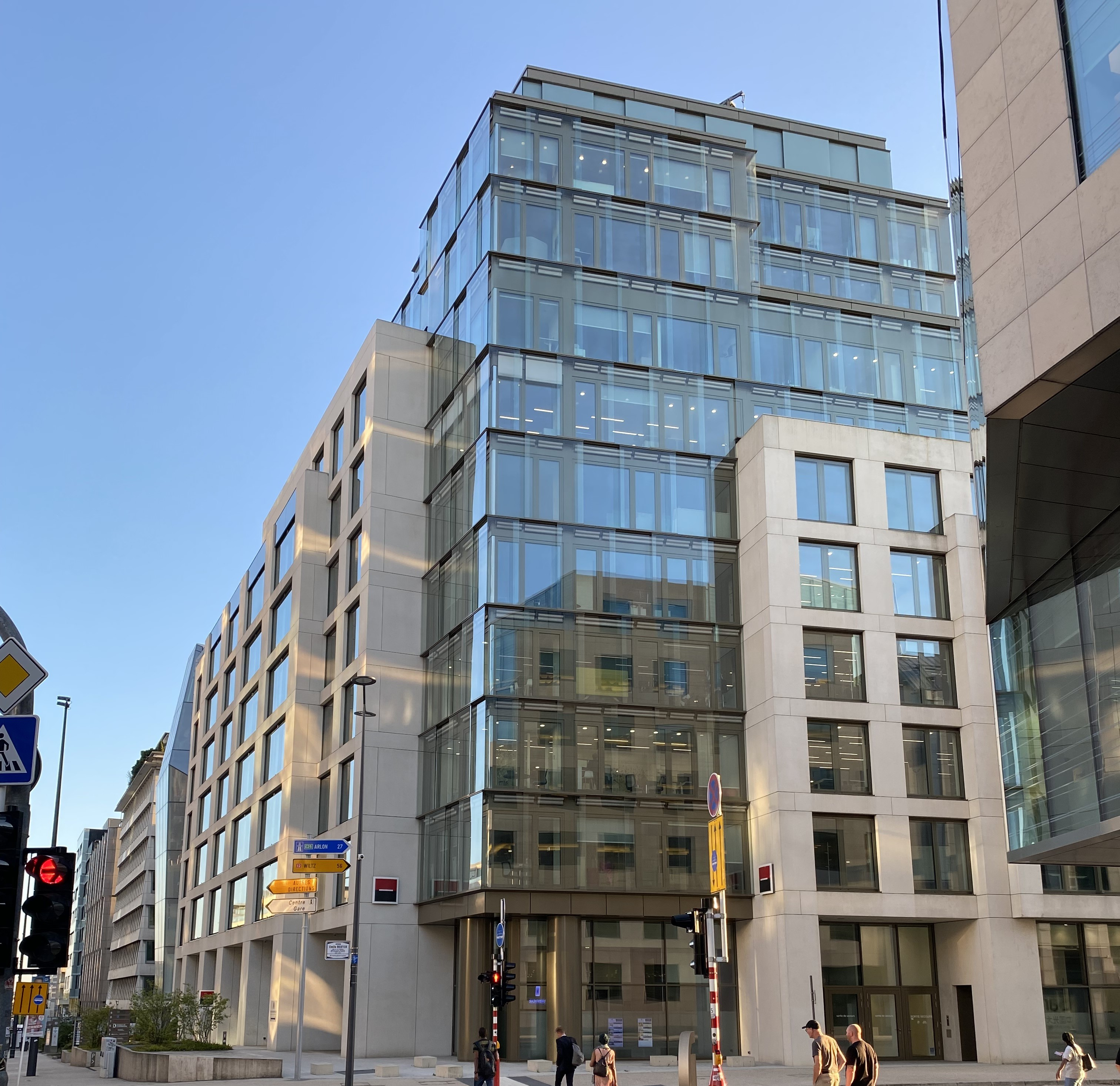
Société Générale Luxembourg head office

BGL BNP Paribas head office, Luxembourg

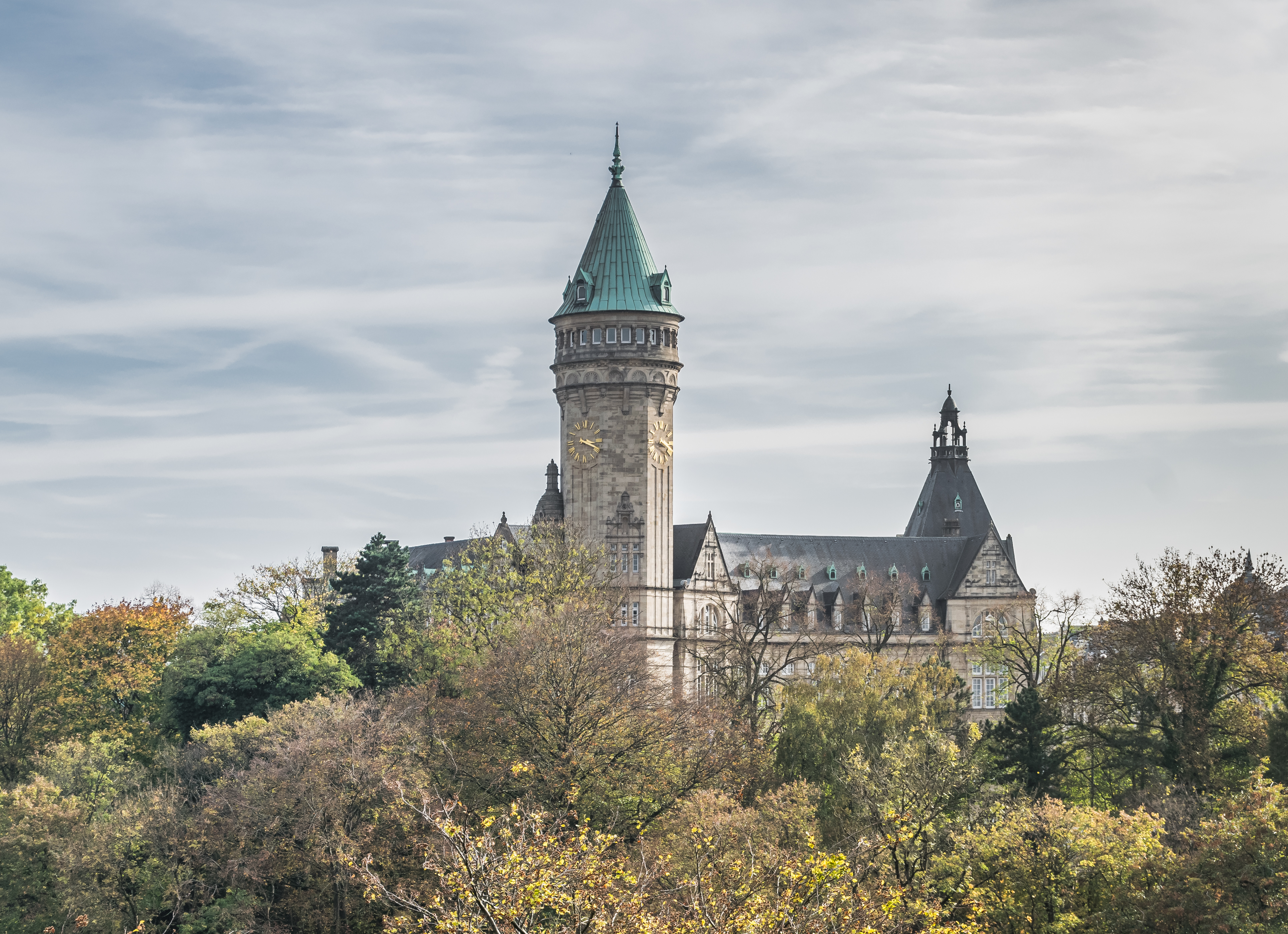
BCEE / Spuerkeess head office, Luxembourg

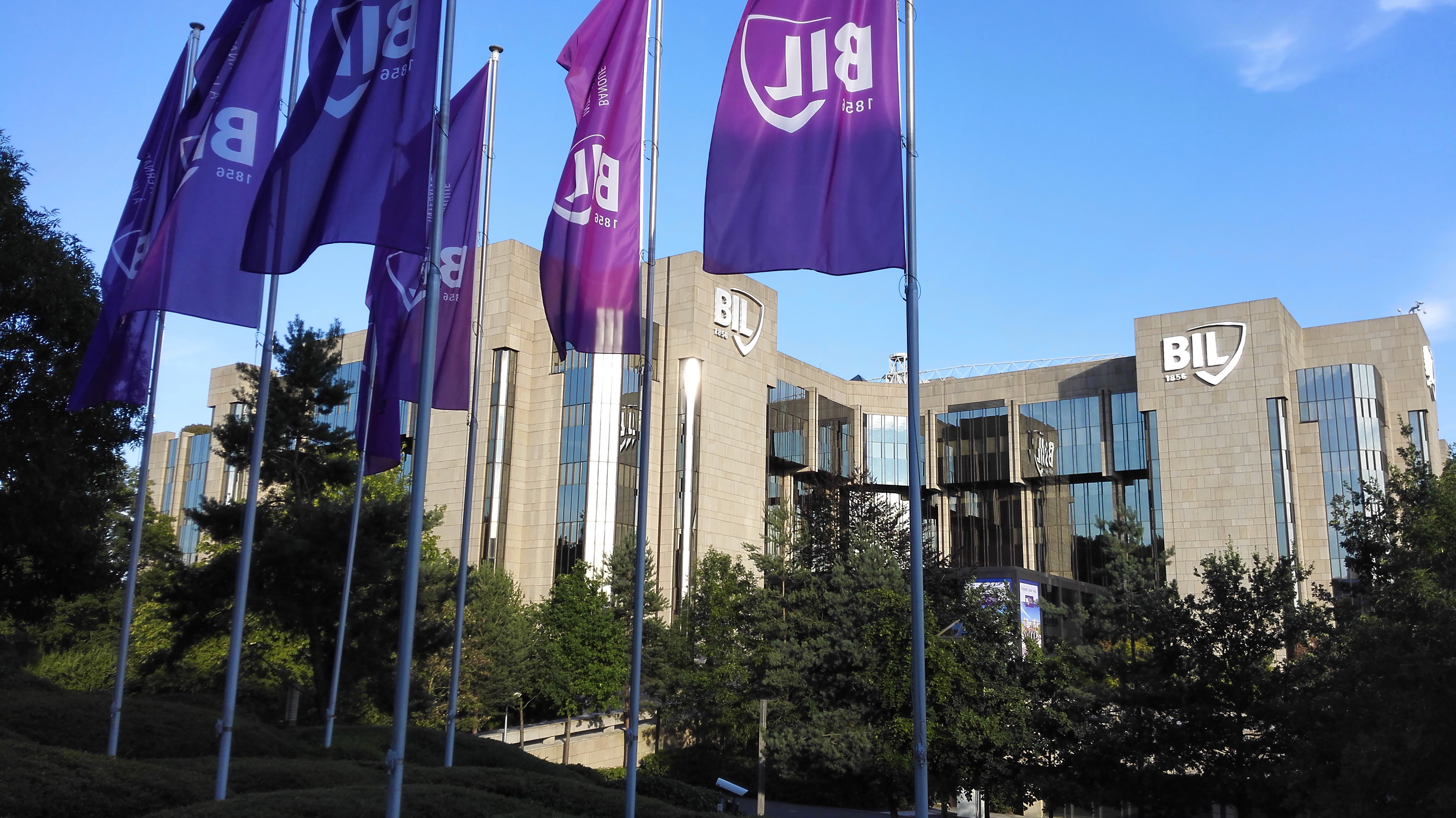
BIL head office, Luxembourg

Banque du Luxembourg head office

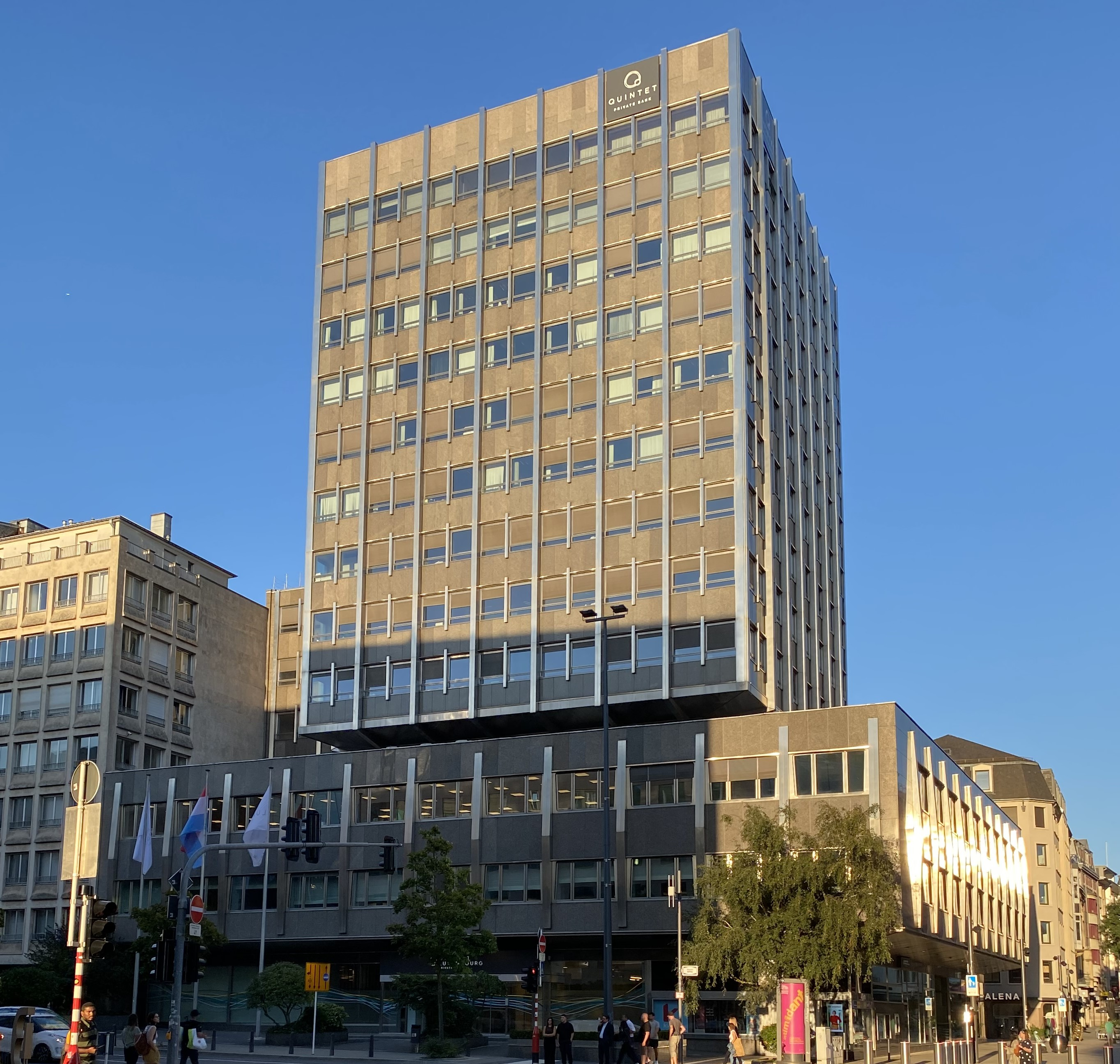
Quintet Private Bank head office, Luxembourg

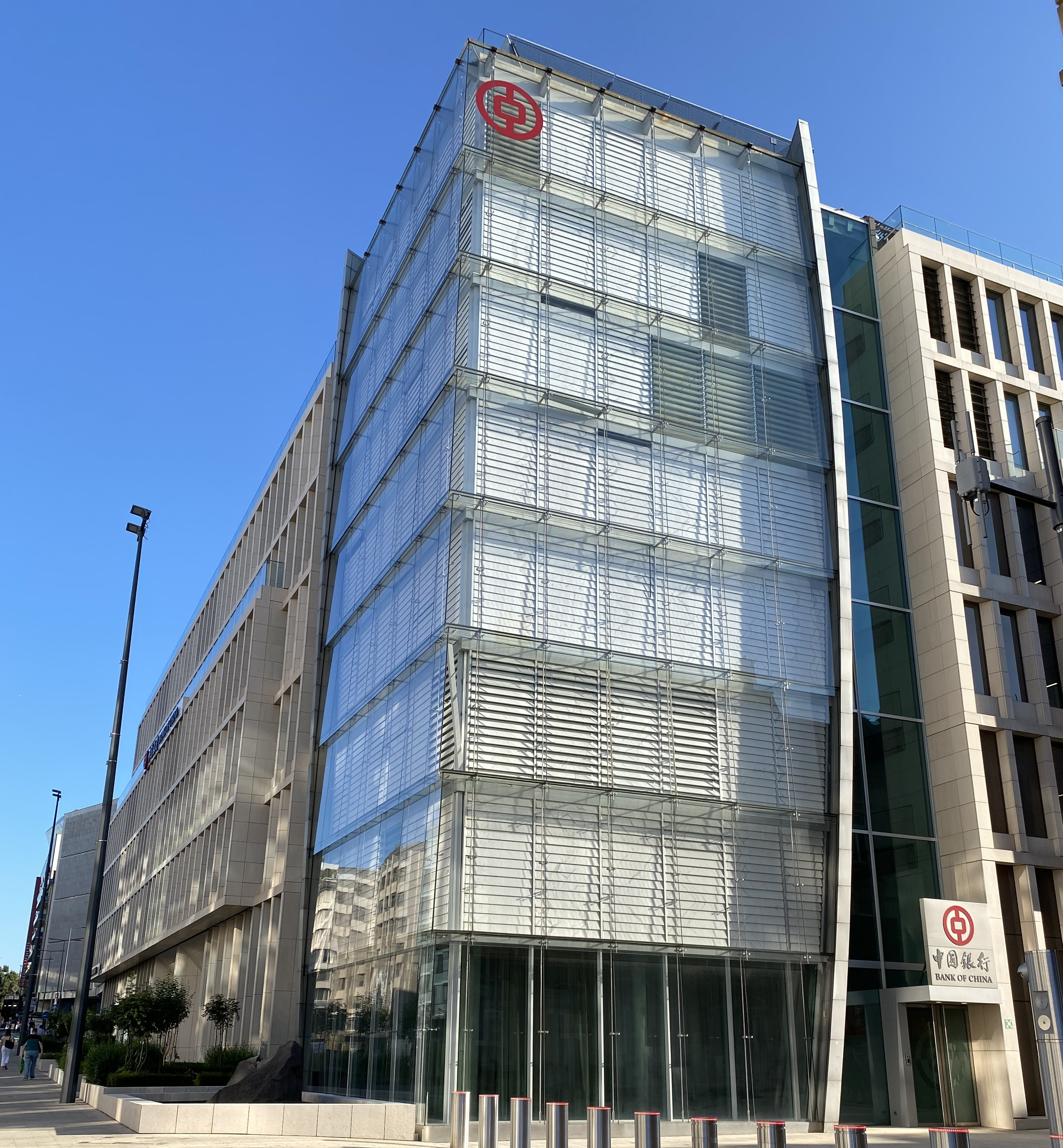
Bank of China Luxembourg head office

The following list of banks in Luxembourg is to be understood within the framework of the European single market and European banking union, which means that Luxembourg's banking system is more open to cross-border banking operations than peers outside of the EU. The list leaves aside the country's National Central Bank within the Eurosystem, the Central Bank of Luxembourg.

== Policy framework ==
European banking supervision distinguishes between significant institutions (SIs) and less significant institutions (LSIs), with SI/LSI designations updated regularly by the European Central Bank (ECB). Significant institutions are directly supervised by the ECB using joint supervisory teams that involve the national competent authorities (NCAs) of individual participating countries. Less significant institutions are supervised by the relevant NCA on a day-to-day basis, under the supervisory oversight of the ECB. In Luxembourg's case, the NCA is the Commission de Surveillance du Secteur Financier.

== Significant institutions ==
As of 1 September 2025, the list of supervised institutions maintained by the ECB included the following two Luxembourg-based banking groups as SIs, with names as indicated by the ECB for each group's consolidating entity:

- Banque et Caisse d'Épargne de l'État (BCEE, also known as Spuerkeess)
- Banque Internationale à Luxembourg SA (BIL)

In addition to these, multiple other euro-area-based banking SI groups have operations in the country. A study published in 2024 assessed that the largest bank by assets in Luxembourg (as opposed to total consolidated assets) at end-2023 was Société Générale (€66.4 billion), followed by BNP Paribas (€63.3 billion, via BGL BNP Paribas), BCEE (€56.2 billion), Deutsche Bank (€32.3 billion), BIL (€30.5 billion), DZ Bank (€25.7 billion), Intesa Sanpaolo (€22.2 billion), ING (€14.4 billion), Crédit Mutuel (€14.1 billion, via Banque de Luxembourg), and Quintet Private Bank (€12.1 billion). Per the September 2025 ECB list, the other SIs based in the euro area that had subsidiaries in Luxembourg are Bankinter, BPER, BPCE, CaixaBank, Commerzbank, Crédit Agricole, Eurobank Ergasias, HSBC Continental Europe, Mediobanca, NORD/LB, RBS Holdings NV (Dutch subsidiary of NatWest), and UniCredit.

Conversely, three SIs in other euro-area countries were under a Luxembourg-based consolidating entity. these are, respectively:

- Atlantic Lux HoldCo Sàrl, parent of Aareal Bank in Germany
- LSF Nani Investments Sàrl, parent of Novo Banco in Portugal
- OTP Luxembourg Sàrl, subsidiary of OTP Group and parent of OTP Banka in Slovenia

== Less significant institutions ==
As of 1 September 2025, the ECB's list of supervised institutions included 53 Luxembourgish LSIs.

=== High-impact LSIs ===
Of these, the following three were designated by the ECB as "high-impact" on the basis of several criteria including size:

- Bank of China (Europe) SA, intermediate parent undertaking of Bank of China in the EU
- Banque Raiffeisen, a local cooperative entity
- PayPal 2 Sàrl, financial holding subsidiary of PayPal

=== Other Luxembourg LSIs under euro-area ownership ===
The remaining five LSIs were:

- Three entities of the Clearstream Group:
  - Clearstream Banking SA
  - Clearstream Fund Centre Holding SA, an intermediate holding entity
  - Clearstream Fund Centre SA
- Delen Private Bank Luxembourg SA, a subsidiary of Belgian LSI Delen Private Bank
- Société Nationale de Crédit et d'Investissement, a public bank

=== Non-euro-area-controlled LSIs ===
Based on the same ECB list, and not counting the two above-listed high-impact LSIs affiliated with Bank of China and PayPal, 37 Luxembourgish LSIs were intermediate holdings and/or subsidiaries or branches of financial groups based outside the euro area:

- Agricultural Bank of China (Luxembourg) SA, subsidiary of Agricultural Bank of China
- (Andorra) Andbank Luxembourg, subsidiary of Andbank
- (Brazil) Banco Bradesco Europa SA, subsidiary of Banco Bradesco
- (Russia) Bank GPB International SA, subsidiary of Gazprombank
- (Switzerland) Bank Julius Baer Europe SA, subsidiary of Julius Baer Group
- (China) Bank of Communications (Luxembourg) SA, subsidiary of Bank of Communications
- (Andorra) Banque de Patrimoines Privés, subsidiary of Creand
- (Lebanon) Bemo Europe - Banque Privée, affiliate of Bemo Bank
- (United States) Brown Brothers Harriman (Luxembourg) SCA, subsidiary of Brown Brothers Harriman & Co.
- (Brazil) BTG Pactual Europe SA, subsidiary of BTG Pactual
- China Construction Bank (Europe) SA, subsidiary of China Construction Bank
- China Everbright Bank (Europe) SA, subsidiary of China Everbright Bank
- China Merchants Bank (Europe) SA, subsidiary of China Merchants Bank
- (Canada) CIBC Capital Markets (Europe) SA, subsidiary of CIBC Capital Markets
- (Norway) DNB Luxembourg SA, subsidiary of DNB Bank
- (Switzerland) Edmond de Rothschild (Europe), part of Edmond de Rothschild Group
- (Switzerland) EFG Investment (Luxembourg) SA, subsidiary of EFG International
  - EFG Bank (Luxembourg) SA
- Industrial and Commercial Bank of China (Europe) SA, subsidiary of ICBC
- (Switzerland) J. Safra Holdings Luxembourg Sàrl, subsidiary of J. Safra Sarasin
  - Banque J. Safra Sarasin (Luxembourg) SA
- (United States) John Deere Bank SA, subsidiary of John Deere
- (Switzerland) Lombard Odier (Europe) SA, subsidiary of Bank Lombard Odier & Co
- (Switzerland) Mirabaud & Cie (Europe) SA, subsidiary of Mirabaud Group
- (Japan) Mitsubishi UFJ Investor Services and Banking (Luxembourg) SA, subsidiary of MUFG
- (Japan) Mizuho Trust & Banking (Luxembourg) SA, subsidiary of Mizuho Financial Group
- (Japan) Nomura Bank (Luxembourg) SA, subsidiary of Nomura Holdings
- (United States) Northern Trust Global Services SE, subsidiary of Northern Trust
- (United States) PayPal (Europe) Sàrl & Cie, SCA, subsidiary of PayPal 2 Sàrl (see above)
- (Japan) Rakuten Europe Bank SA, subsidiary of Rakuten
- (Sweden) Luxembourg branch of Skandinaviska Enskilda Banken AB
- (Japan) SMBC Nikko Bank (Luxembourg) SA, subsidiary of SMBC Group
- (Japan) Sumitomo Mitsui Trust Bank (Luxembourg) SA, subsidiary of Sumitomo Mitsui Trust Holdings
- (Sweden) Luxembourg branch of Svenska Handelsbanken AB
- (Switzerland) Swissquote Bank Europe SA, subsidiary of Swissquote
- (Switzerland) Union Bancaire Privée (Europe) SA, subsidiary of Union Bancaire Privée
- (Liechtenstein) VP Bank (Luxembourg) SA, subsidiary of VP Bank

In addition, 8 Luxembourg LSIs are privately owned by non-euro-area-based individual or funds:

- Advanzia Bank SA, subsidiary of Norway-based Kistefos
- (Sweden) Moneyball BidCo Sàrl, controlled by EQT AB
  - Banking Circle SA, subsidiary of Moneyball BidCo
- European Depositary Bank SA, subsidiary of Bermuda-based Apex Group
- FundBank (Europe) SA, owned by Cayman Islands-based entrepreneur Don Seymour
- (Egypt) March Capital Holding Sàrl, subsidiary of Sawiris Group
  - RiverBank SA, subsidiary of March Capital Holding
- (Qatar) Quintet Private Bank (Europe) SA, controlled by the House of Thani

A number of LSIs in other euro-area countries are similarly owned privately through Luxembourg-based holding entities.

== Third-country branches ==
As of 13 October 2025, the following banks established outside the European Economic Area had branches in Luxembourg ("third-country branches" in EU parlance):

- Agricultural Bank of China
- (Brazil) Banco do Brasil
- (Brazil) Banco Safra
- Bank of China
- (China) Bank of Communications
- (Switzerland) Banque de Commerce et de Placements
- China Construction Bank
- China Everbright Bank
- China Merchants Bank
- (United Kingdom) HSBC Holdings
- Industrial and Commercial Bank of China
- (United Kingdom) NatWest Group
- (Brazil) Banco Votorantim

== Defunct banks ==
A number of former Luxembourg banks, defined as having been based in the present-day territory of Luxembourg, are documented on Wikipedia. They are listed below in chronological order of establishment.

- Banque Nationale du Grand-Duché de Luxembourg (1873-1881)
- Société Générale Alsacienne de Banque (1893-1940 and 1956-1995)
- Banque Fortuna (1920-2022)
- Alfred Levy & Company (1926-1940)
- Banque Européenne du Luxembourg (1961-1979)
- Compagnie luxembourgeoise de banque (1967-2009)
- Bank of Credit and Commerce International (1972-1991)
- East-West United Bank (1974-2024)
- Institut Monétaire Luxembourgeois (1983-1998)
- Compagnie de Banque Privée (2007-2011)
- Banque Havilland (2009-2024)

== See also ==
- List of banks in the euro area
- List of banks in Europe
