= BIP Investment Partners =

BIP Investment Partners S.A.
- Type: Public
- Traded as: LuxSE: BIP
- Industry: Finance
- Founded: April 2000; 26 years ago
- Headquarters: 1, rue des Coquelicots, Luxembourg City, Luxembourg
- Area served: Luxembourg
- Key people: Michel Wurth, Chairman; Bruno Lambert, General Manager
- Services: Investment, private equity
- Website: www.bip.lu

BIP Investment Partners S.A. is an investment company based in Luxembourg City, in southern Luxembourg. Its activities are divided between providing private equity to businesses, particularly venture capital to startups, and investing in large, well-established Luxembourg-based businesses

The company was founded in 2000 as a joint venture between Banque Générale du Luxembourg (BGL), later a part of Fortis Group, and now as the newly re-formed BGL and several smaller partners, under the name BGL Investment Partners, which was changed to 'BIP Investment Partners' in February 2006 after the rebranding of BGL. BIP is listed on the Luxembourg Stock Exchange, where it is one of the ten component companies of the main LuxX Index stock market index.
