= Trilantic Capital Partners =

Global private equity firm

- Company type: Private
- Industry: Private equity
- Predecessor: Lehman Brothers Merchant Banking
- Founded: 2009; 17 years ago
- Headquarters: New York, New York, U.S. London, England, UK
- Key people: Charles Ayres, chairman, Trilantic executive committee Vittorio Pignatti-Morano, chairman, Trilantic Europe
- Products: Leveraged buyout, growth capital
- Total assets: $9.7 billion
- Number of employees: 60+
- Website: www.trilantic.com

Trilantic Capital Partners is a global private equity firm focused on control and significant minority investments across a range of industries in North America and Europe managed by Trilantic North America and Trilantic Europe. The firm specializes in management buyouts, recapitalizations, growth equity, middle market investments and corporate divestitures investments. Trilantic invests through equity and equity-linked securities transactions.

Trilantic North America primarily targets investments in the business services, consumer, energy and financial services sectors; Trilantic Europe primarily targets investments in business services, consumer and leisure, healthcare, industrial and TMT sectors. The firm has managed six institutional private equity funds with aggregate capital commitments of $9.7 billion, as of July 2019.

== History ==
Trilantic was spun out from Lehman Brothers Merchant Banking (LBMB), in 2009, by five founding partners, each of whom had workers at LBMB, which had been founded as the private equity arm of Lehman Brothers, in 1986, during the 1980s leveraged buyout boom.In April 2009, Trilantic acquired LBMB out of the bankruptcy estate of Lehman Brothers with the support of Reinet Investments S.C.A, a Luxembourg securitization vehicle controlled by the Rupert family and listed on the Luxembourg Stock Exchange.

In May 2022, it was announced that Trilantic Europe would acquire the polling company Kantar Public (previously part of the Kantar Group) in the third quarter of 2022. Kantar Public subsequently rebranded as Verian.

== See also ==
- Lehman Brothers Venture Partners
