= Reinet =

Reinet may refer to:

- Reinet Investments, a Luxembourg-based investment company
- Graaff Reinet, a town in Eastern Cape province, South Africa
