= The Alyona Show =

- Title card
- Presented by: Alyona Minkovski

Production
- Production location: Washington, DC
- Running time: 60 minutes

Original release
- Network: RT
- Release: October 9, 2009 – July 30, 2012

The Alyona Show was a current affairs television program hosted by Alyona Minkovski that aired on RT from 2009 to 2012. The show featured in-depth analysis of news stories and also frequently criticizes the mainstream media, national politics in the United States, and the U.S. financial industry.

The show's final edition aired on July 30, 2012, after which Minkovski left RT to join HuffPost Live.

== History ==
Alyona Minkovski joined RT as a producer in December 2008 and was given an on-air assignment on Inauguration Day in January 2009. After doing a second pilot show, she was then tapped to become host of RT's first live show. The hour-long show premiered in October, 2009, airing weekdays.

In April 2010, the show was one of the first to interview Julian Assange, before his organization WikiLeaks received global attention for leaking U.S. diplomatic cables later in the year. The interview has been described as one of the most sympathetic to Assange. Minkovski has said that she would have done the interview differently with "5 million more questions about him and about WikiLeaks."

In the 2010 Halloween broadcast, Minkovski spent the entire episode parodying the Glenn Beck program on Fox News. While covering the Republican primaries in June 2011, Minkovski called Sarah Palin—who announced she was not running—a "money-grabbing media whore" for taking attention away from other candidates.

== Format ==
The Alyona Show's editorial premise was "bringing you the real headlines with none of the mercy". The show began with a segment where Minkovski pointed out news stories under-covered or over-covered by the mainstream media. She wanted to bring her generation, which ignores mainstream reporting and goes online for hard news, back to television. Minkovski has said that the show's sarcastic and satirical tone is aimed at a younger audience. The programs focus on topics like government spying, the Federal Reserve, and America's undeclared wars, as well as media laziness, Washington corruption, Wall Street tomfoolery because, according to Minkovski, "there is a need to open people’s eyes. I think that unfortunately some people don’t always want to hear the truth, and it might not be pretty, but unless you put it in their face and make them hear that truth, there can’t be change. I think that’s the way the country becomes better."

The show's main segments feature in-depth discussions on news stories with guests and monologue "rants" by Minkovski expressing her views on current affairs. It ends with a five-minute "Happy Hour" segment for stories "[she doesn't] believe deserve this whole epic showing like on CNN."

== Reception ==
Tracy Quan in The Daily Beast described The Alyona Show as "one of RT's most popular vehicles" and wrote that it is one "where girl-power aesthetic meets American liberalism." Jesse Zwick in The New Republic wrote that one journalist told him Minkovski is "probably the best interviewer on cable news."

Benjamin R. Freed wrote in the avant-garde culture magazine SOMA that the show was "one of the most refreshing" primetime news and commentary programs. He also wrote that "equal parts Daily Show and cable news arena, The Alyona Show does political talk with razor-sharp wit."

David Weigel called the show "an in-house attempt at a newsy cult hit" and noted that "her meatiest segments were about government spying, and the Federal Reserve, and America's undeclared wars".

Minkovski complained about an interview program that introduced her as "a hard-left, Russian-born, 'blah blah blah' who works for the Russian-funded" (RT), saying it made her sound like "Putin's girl in Washington." She believes such critics are just trying to discredit her but that it only bothers her when they call her "anti-American," because she is not. (Minkovski is a registered Democrat who calls herself liberal.) She has responded by suggesting "people are just so scared of an 'other,' something that might be unknown to them and they can't see past that. So in their eyes, working for RT de-legitimizes you." At the same time, when she has been denouncing very harshly Republicans and the Fox Network for having a homophobic agenda, she has refused to answer what her opinion is regarding the anti-homosexual laws passed in Russia under Vladimir Putin in 2013.

Julia Ioffe in the Columbia Journalism Review described how Minkovski had attacked Glenn Beck for asking why RT was in "lock-step with the Obama Administration". Minkovski argued that Beck was "not on the side of America. And the fact that my channel is more honest with the American people is something you should be ashamed of." Ioffe asked "Since when does Russia Today defend the policies of any American president? Or the informational needs of the American public, for that matter?"
