= Ocean Group =

Ocean Group may refer to:

- Ocean Group International, holding company
- Ocean Group plc, former British transport company
- Ocean Productions, Canadian media company
