= Alfred Levy & Company =

Luxembourgish bank

Alfred Levy & Company was a Luxembourg private bank founded in Luxembourg City in 1926. It was a comparatively small bank within the wider interwar banking sector, but also as an important actor in the market for holding companies that emerged after Luxembourg’s 1929 holding legislation. The bank is also notable for its place in the history of Jewish refugee assistance before the Second World War and for its liquidation under Nazi occupation in 1940.

The bank was created in 1926 through cooperation between Alfred Lévy and two foreign financial institutions, A. Spitzer et Compagnie from Paris and the Privatbank Glarus from Glarus. By the early 1930s it operated from rue Philippe in Luxembourg City. Contemporary promotional literature presented Banque Alfred Lévy & Cie. as one of Luxembourg’s principal private banks and emphasized its international connections with Paris, Brussels, and larger German, Dutch, and American financial houses.

Although it was smaller than Banque Internationale à Luxembourg, the bank played a meaningful role in the interwar holding-company business. Alfred Lévy & Cie. was one of the banks that helped provide the infrastructure for Luxembourg holding companies by domiciling companies at the bank’s address and supplying nominee directors. The bank was also one of the founding members of the Luxembourg Stock Exchange and of the ABBL (Association of Banks and Bankers, Luxembourg). The bank was therefore part of the institutional network that helped transform Luxembourg into an international financial centre during the interwar period.

Alfred Lévy and his bank was an important actor in the Jewish refugee history as is documented in numerous articles by the Memorial de la Shoah Luxembourg. Alfred Levy’s name appears repeatedly in reports about refugee aid and places him in the orbit of ESRA, the local Jewish relief organisation.

The position of the bank changed decisively after the German invasion of Luxembourg in May 1940. The German authorities regarded Banque Alfred Lévy and Banque Commerciale as “Jewish banks.” Part of Alfred Lévy’s capital had already been transferred to the United States from September 1939 and his departure on the day of the occupation placed the bank “immediately in liquidation.” Deutsche Bank took over its premises.
