= Alyona Minkovski =

American journalist

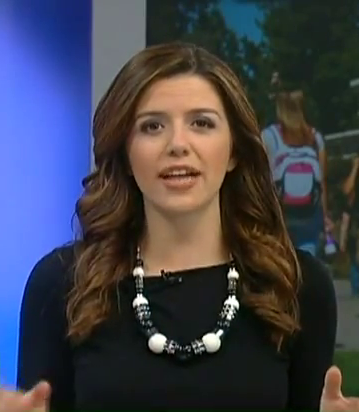
- Born: Alyona Leonidovna Minkovski; 30 January 1986 (age 40); Moscow, Russian SFSR, Soviet Union
- Education: University of California, Santa Cruz
- Parents: Leonid Minkovski; Irina Rodnina

Alyona Leonidovna Minkovski (Russian: Алёна Леони́довна Минько́вская; born 30 January 1986) is an American journalist, television host and commentator. In 2011, she was named on the Forbes 30 under 30 media list.

Minkovski is currently a producer of American Metamorphosis.

== Early life and education ==
Born in Moscow, Minkovski was raised in California. She is a daughter of the United Russia politician and figure skater Irina Rodnina and entrepreneur Leonid Minkovski, from a Russian Jewish family. When she was 4, she immigrated to the United States with her family. She graduated with a B.A degree in politics from the University of California, Santa Cruz.

== Career ==
In 2017, she profiled opposition activists running for office in Moscow's municipal elections for The Nation and wrote about anti-Trump Russian-Americans for Fusion (now Splinter).

=== RT (2009–2012) ===
From 2009 to 2012, Minkovski hosted a political commentary program called The Alyona Show on RT America, which premiered when she was only 23 years old. The final edition of the program aired on 30 July 2012.

=== HuffPost Live (2012–2016) ===
From August 2012 to December 2016, Minkovski was a host for HuffPost Live, The Huffington Post's online network. In 2016, she covered the US election, traveling the country for primaries, conventions, and Presidential debates. She also created the branded programs Political Junkies and Free Speech Zone, and produced and hosted documentary and short form videos. In August 2016, Minkovski produced a documentary for HuffPost about wrongful conviction titled Stolen Time: Injustice in Brooklyn. In 2014, she was nominated for a GLAAD Media Award for Outstanding Digital Journalism in coverage of bisexual activists holding a first ever forum at the White House.

=== Salon (2017) ===
In October 2017, Minkovski joined Salon as a host for the live interview show Salon Talks and as the producer and host of the Salon Now video series.
