= Charles Ayres =

American businessman

- Education: Duke University; Dartmouth College
- Occupation: Financier
- Known for: Chairman of Trilantic Capital Partners

Charles "Charlie" Ayres is a managing partner, Chairman of the Board and Chairman of the Executive Committee of Trilantic Capital Partners, formerly known as Lehman Brothers Merchant Banking.

== Early life ==
Ayres obtained a B.A. in economics, magna cum laude, from Duke University and an M.B.A. from the Tuck School of Business.

== Career ==
Before entering private equity leadership roles, Ayres worked in the M&A department of Lazard and in the corporate finance group of Kidder, Peabody & Co.. From 1987 to 1991 he was a managing partner at HMA Investments, Inc.,a private investment firm focused on middle-market management buyouts, and he was later a managing partner at McCown De Leeuw & Co., a $1.2 billion private equity fund.

He then became head of DB Capital Partners North America, part of Deutsche Bank,where he was a member of the Americas Regional Executive Committee and oversaw $1.2 billion of investments and a 25-member investment team. In February 2003 he was a founding partner of MidOcean Partners, and later that year he joined Lehman Brothers Merchant Banking, where he became a managing director and member of its investment committee. In April 2009 Lehman Brothers named him head of its global merchant banking business.

== Trilantic ==
Following Lehman Brothers' 2008 bankruptcy, the merchant banking unit was bought from the Lehman estate and spun out in early 2009 as Trilantic Capital Partners under Ayres's leadership. A 2012 Pennsylvania Public School Employees' Retirement System board document described Trilantic Capital Partners V as the firm's first independent fundraise after the spin-out, and named Ayres among its five partners, all of whom had previously worked together at Lehman. The firm later separated into Trilantic North America and Trilantic Europe, and Ayres is chairman and a partner of Trilantic North America, as well as a member of its executive and investment committees.

== Other activities ==
Ayres serves on the board of trustees of the Hotchkiss School and is a member of the Trinity College Board of Visitors of Duke University. He previously served on the board of overseers of the Amos Tuck School and is a former member of the Young Presidents' Organization, Gotham chapter.
