= Société Nationale de Crédit et d'Investissement =

Bank of Luxembourg

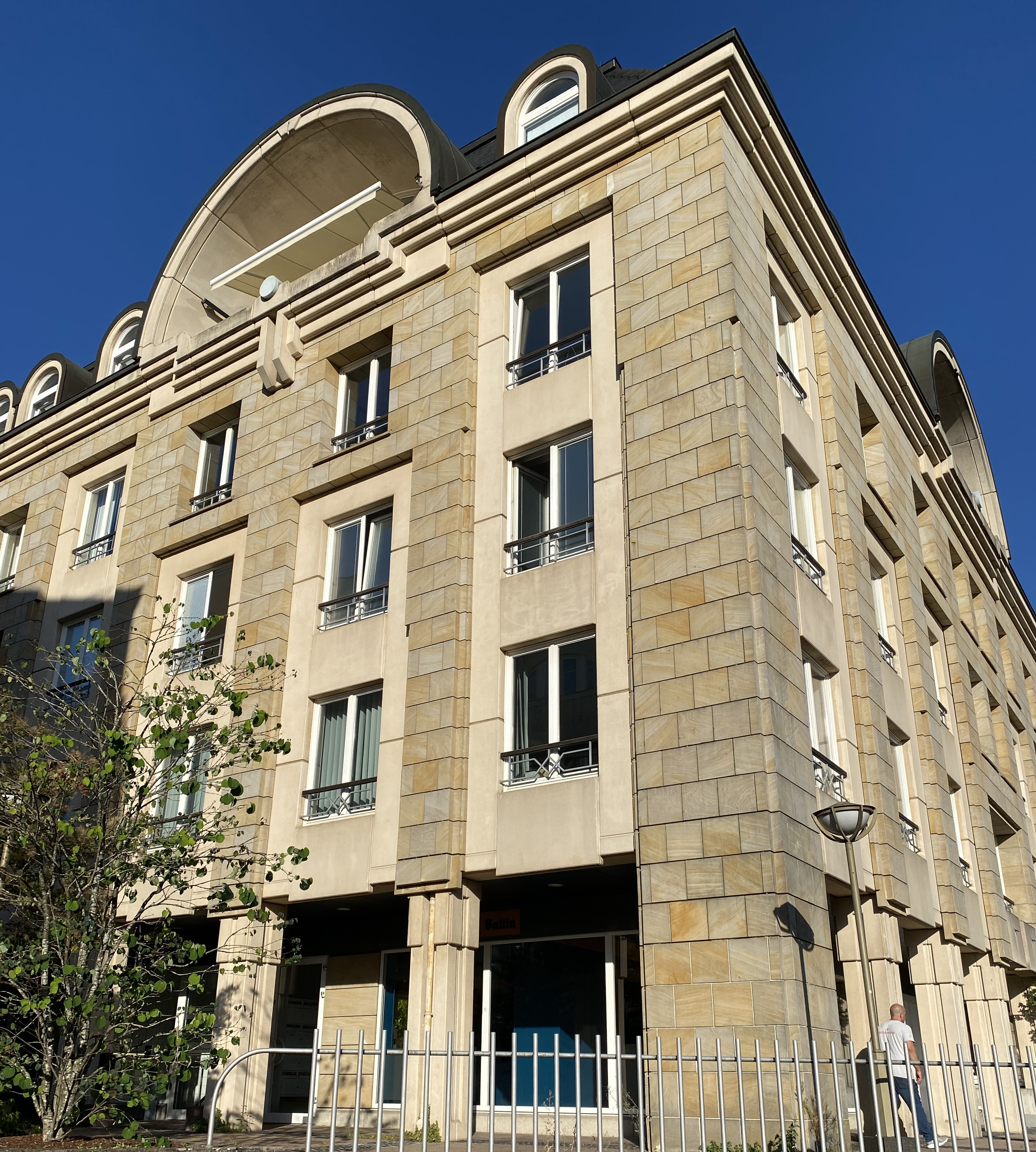
- Head office building of SNCI in Luxembourg City
- Founded: 1977
- Net income: €47.00 mln (2014)
- Total assets: €1333.00 mln (2014)
- Number of employees: 14 (2014)
- Website: snci.lu

Société Nationale de Crédit et d'Investissement (SNCI) is a public-law banking institution in Luxembourg City. According to its website, it is designed to encourage business investments, start-ups, and research initiatives. Founded in 1977, it is wholly owned by the State of Luxembourg.

== Financial services ==
SNCI provides medium and long-term financing for investments made by Luxembourg-based companies, including Luxembourg companies operating abroad, and start-up loans for small and medium-sized enterprises. SNCI also provides loans for financing professional equipment including equipment for safety or environmental protection. It also offers innovation loans for research-and-development programmes or projects of industrial enterprises and service providers; foreign investments financing; and equity loans for limited liability companies. On average, SNCI loans cover some 25% of investments in fixed assets for industrial projects while up to 75% of eligible start-up investments can be covered for young craftsmen, traders, hoteliers, or restaurant owners.

=== Equipment loans ===
Equipment loans are for investments relating to the creation, extension, reorientation, or takeover of Luxembourg SMEs in the skilled-craft, commercial, hotel, or industrial sectors. They are granted by decision of the SNCI Board of Directors, via an authorized bank, for financing intangible assets (patents, licenses, or software), tangible assets (equipment for the production or provision of services), and land, buildings or parts of buildings to be used for professional purposes. The fixed-rate loans, with a duration of 10 years and to be reimbursed quarterly, usually start at €12,500 and may not exceed €2.5 million. They normally cover from 25 to 60% of eligible costs (75% for a first business) depending on the sector.

=== Start-up loans ===
Start-up loans, designed to encourage new entrepreneurs to create or acquire SMEs, can cover the financing of business plans, land, and buildings to be used for professional activities, working capital, equipment, intangibles (licenses, software), and start-up activities (advertising, studies). Support ranges between €5,000 and €250,000 but may not exceed 40% of eligible costs. The duration is decided on a case-by-case basis depending on the nature of the costs. Reimbursement at quarterly intervals must start within five years but repayments can be made earlier without penalty.

=== Medium and long-term loans ===
Medium-term and long-term loans can be granted to industrial enterprises and service providers, with equity of at least €25,000, for financing tangible and intangible assets and for land to be used for professional purposes. Projects to be financed must have a value of at least €100,000. Loans are usually for 25 to 30% of the investment. They start at €25,000 and may not exceed €10 million unless ministerial authorization is received. Interest is at the "SNCI prime rate" at the time the loan contract is signed and is free of commissions and additional charges. The rate is fixed by the SNCI's Board of Directors based on refinancing costs. Medium-term loans are for five years, and long-term loans are for six to 10 years. They are to be repaid in fixed quarterly payments.

=== Innovation loans ===
Innovation loans are designed to assist industrial enterprises and service providers in financing research and development programmes or projects introducing new products, techniques, or services. They usually cover 25% of the eligible costs and have a duration of three to five years. Quarterly repayments must start within a maximum of two years.

=== Equity loans ===
Equity loans are designed to assist Luxembourg limited liability companies in promoting the creation, extension, conversion, reorientation, and rationalization of industrial, craft, and commercial enterprises. Amounts are fixed on a case-by-case basis by the SNCI's Board of Directors and require approval by the competent ministers. The duration is normally no more than 10 years but a forbearance period for repayment of the capital may be accorded. The return is identical to that of the shareholders or partners but with a contractually fixed minimum.

=== Export credits ===
Export credits may be granted to Luxembourg-based industrial and skilled-craft enterprises or enterprises in their efforts to export goods or services. The SNCI may take a stake of between 25% and 75% of the eligible value of the operation to be financed. The duration usually ranges from six months to five years and the interest rate is linked to the cost of refinancing.

== Recent activities ==
In 2009, the SNCI Board granted loans amounting to EUR 83.6 million, an increase of 63% over the previous year despite the difficult economic climate. Equipment loans, which were already on the rise in 2008 with the financing of EUR 28.9 million for 108 projects, again rose in 2009 to EUR 32.1 million for 104 projects, most being granted to the skilled-craft sector. Large companies were granted nine loans for a total of EUR 18.7 million, compared to six in 2008 (EUR 6.4 million). For start-ups and takeovers, there were 20 loans amounting to EUR 1.7 million compared to 27 in 2008. Most were for very small companies and led to the creation or support of 110 jobs. As a result of non-recurring transactions, overall results for the year were substantially down in 2008 with a profit of EUR 38.13 million compared to EUR 75.2 million.

== Applicable legislation ==
SNCI's operations are defined in Regulations of the Grand Duchy of Luxembourg, in particular "Crédits d'équipements" (Equipment Loans) and "Prêts à moyen et long terme de la SNCI" (Medium and Long-Term Loans by the SNCI).

== See also ==
- List of national development banks
- List of banks in Luxembourg
