= Compagnie luxembourgeoise de banque =

Compagnie luxembourgeoise de banque was a Luxembourg-based bank founded on 11 April 1967. It was created as a subsidiary of the German Dresdner Bank, which held 99.76% of its shares. At the time of its foundation, Maurice Sevenig was the only Luxembourgish member of the board of directors.

The creation of the bank marked an important stage in the internationalisation of the Luxembourg financial centre. Dresdner Bank was the first German bank to establish a banking presence in Luxembourg after the Second World War, at a moment when Luxembourg was beginning to emerge as a European financial centre. In 1967, the Luxembourg banking sector still counted only 26 institutions, most of them foreign-owned.

Dresdner Bank was followed by Commerzbank International S.A. in 1969 and by the Compagnie Financière de la Deutsche Bank in 1970. The arrival of German banks in Luxembourg was closely linked to the development of the Euromarkets. German banking regulation required banks to place part of their deposits with the Bundesbank as non-remunerated reserves, while Luxembourg, which had no central bank of its own, did not impose such a requirement. This made Luxembourg attractive for international eurocurrency operations, including credits in euro-Deutsche Marks. The solvency rules were also less restrictive in Luxembourg than in Germany. the arrival of the German banks gave a significant impetus to Luxembourg's euro-market activities and contributed to the growth of the financial centre.

The bank was one of the founding members of Cedel (today Clearstream). Cedel, the Centrale de Livraison de Valeurs Mobilières, was created in Luxembourg in 1970 by 71 banks from 15 countries and became operational in January 1971. It was established in response to the rapid growth of the Eurobond market and allowed securities settlement to be handled by book entry rather than by the costly physical transfer of certificates.

The bank's first registered office was located at 34a rue Philippe II in Luxembourg City. Around 1970, it moved its headquarters to the so-called Wiltheim House, at the corner of rue Nicolas and rue du Marché-aux-Herbes, which had been rebuilt or remodelled by the architect René Mailliet.

In 1972, the Luxembourg bank opened a branch in Switzerland.

By the mid-1980s, the bank had also developed private banking activities. The bank offered not only account and securities-deposit services but also a developed wealth-management business.

Following the merger of Dresdner Bank into Commerzbank in Germany in May 2009, the Dresdner Bank name disappeared as an independent banking entity; its Luxembourg activities were integrated into the Commerzbank group.
