= LuxX Index =

Luxembourgish main stock market index

The LuxX Price is the main stock market index of the Luxembourg Stock Exchange, the stock exchange based in Luxembourg City, in southern Luxembourg. The LuxX is a weighted index of the nine most valuable listed stocks by free floated market capitalisation (ten until the collapse of Fortis in 2008). The index was fixed at 1,000 on 4 January 1999: the first day of trading after Luxembourg adopted the euro. The nine companies currently included in the index are:

Company	Industry	Country	Weighting
Aperam ne	Metals	LUX	15.82%
Arcelor Mittal	Steel	LUX	20.04%
Brederode	Investment	LUX	4.56%
Luxempart	Investment	LUX	3.69%
Reinet Investments	Investment	LUX	14.40%
RTL Group	Media	LUX	20.63%
SES	Telecommunications	LUX	19.55%
Socfinaf	Resource extraction	LUX	0.68%
Socfinasia	Resource extraction	LUX	0.59%
Source: Luxembourg Stock Exchange

== Historical quotes ==
Year end	Close	Annual change (%)
Start	1,000	-
1999	1,397	▲ +39.7%
2000	1,388	▼ –0.7%
2001	1,116	▼ –19.6%
2002	790	▼ –29.2%
2003	1,019	▲ +29.0%
2004	1,292	▲ +26.8%
2005	1,637	▲ +26.7%
2006	2,177	▲ +33.0%
2007	2,419	▲ +11.1%
2008	981	▼ –59.4%
2009	1,371	▲ +40.0%
2010	1,542	▲ +12.4%
2011	1,135	▼ -26.4%
2012	1,248	▲ +10.0%
2013	1,451	▲ +16.1%
2014	1,520	▲
2015	1,391	▼
2016	1,669	▲
2017	1,638	▼
Source: Luxembourg Stock Exchange
