= Gold & Wood =

Gold and Wood is a Luxembourg eyewear brand specialising in handcrafted optical frames and sunglasses made from natural and precious materials, including wood, buffalo horn and gold.

History

Ahead of the 2026 SILMO Paris optical fair, ownership of the Gold & Wood trademark was transferred to Régis Poussin. A new company was established in September 2026 under his leadership to develop the brand.

An optometrist with a background in visual health and ophthalmic optics, Régis grew up around his grandfather’s workshop, which produced prototypes and custom metal components for the metallurgical industry. Its activities included bonding materials to metal substrates, machining and precision cutting.

During the year preceding the establishment of the new company, Régis Poussin and his collaborators supported opticians seeking maintenance and repair solutions for existing Gold & Wood frames, including products they had not themselves sold.

Materials and craftsmanship

The brand’s development focuses on natural and precious materials, particularly buffalo horn, with attention to its textures, translucency and natural colour variations, alongside the development of exclusive colours.

Its approach combines traditional frame craftsmanship with precision ophthalmic optics. Lens cutting, faceting, polishing and careful mounting form part of the finishing process. Frames and lenses are considered together, with attention to fit, balance, comfort and visual performance.

Independence and artistic collaborations

Gold & Wood operates as an independent eyewear brand and collaborates with illustrators, photographers, designers, ceramic artists and sculptors.

Artists, craftspeople and supporters associated with the brand form a circle known as “Friends of the House”. These relationships contribute to its creative projects and its exploration of forms, materials, colours and textures.

== Awards ==
Gold & Wood has been nominated for and won numerous industry awards, like the prestigious Silmo d'Or for its "Moon" and "Star" sunglasses.

== Celebrities ==
Celebrities known for wearing the brand have included Angelina Jolie, Jamie Foxx, Shaquille O'Neal, Jose Canseco, Shane West, Traci Bingham, Tommy Davidson, Tim Cook, Samuel L. Jackson, Snoop Dogg and fashion designer Christian Siriano, to name a few.
