= Advanzia Bank =

Online bank from Luxemburg

Advanzia Bank S.A.

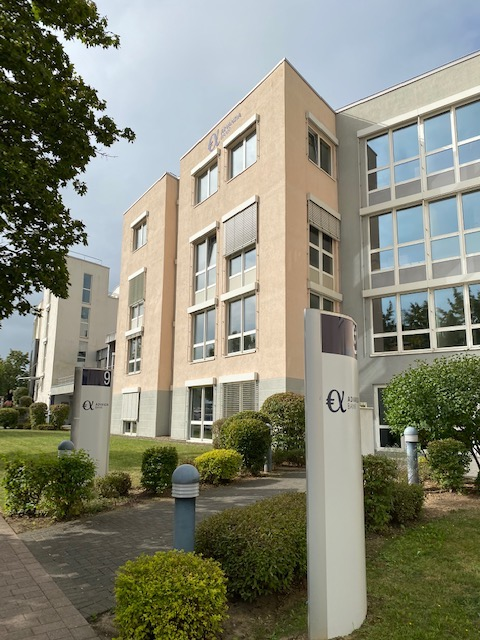
- Headquarters of Advanzia Bank
- Company type: private (Société Anonyme)
- Founded: 2005; 21 years ago in Luxembourg
- Headquarters: Munsbach, Luxembourg
- Area served: Europe
- Key people: Nishant Fafalia, CEO
- Products: Credit cards, savings accounts
- Owner: Kistefos
- Website: advanzia.com

Advanzia Bank is a European digital bank based in Munsbach, Luxembourg. It offers no-fee credit cards and deposit accounts for private customers. Its service portfolio also contains co-branded credit cards and charge cards for business partners and other financial institutions, an area in which it is one of the largest actors in the market. Advanzia Bank is subject to the supervision of Luxembourg’s national financial supervisory authority.

== History ==
Advanzia Bank was founded at the initiative of former founders of the Norwegian Bankia Bank ASA, a bank that was sold to Banco Santander in 2005. The new company was issued a banking license by the Luxembourg Ministry of Finance in late 2005 and went on to launch its business operations in 2006. Advanzia Bank also entered the German market in the same year in a development seen as an example of the increasing competition between national and foreign financial institutions at that time.

Ever since its formation, Advanzia Bank has been a digital or virtual bank with no physical branches. It initially focused its activities on two products: a no-fee credit card and a deposit account as an investment option with an above-average interest rate. Advanzia Bank overcame the 2008 financial crisis without any major problems, recording its first profit in 2009.".

From 2010 onwards, Advanzia Bank set out to make its business activities more international. This approach was made possible thanks to a European directive concerning the distance marketing of financial services, i.e., banking without branches in the target markets. The bank launched operations in France in 2012, Austria in 2015, Spain in 2019 and Italy in 2021. In 2018/2019, Advanzia Bank acquired the credit card portfolio of the Swedish Catella Bank.

Advanzia Bank rolled out mobile payments for its no-fee credit cards in 2020, for example via Google Pay. In addition to issuing credit cards from Mastercard, the bank now also has a corresponding license from Visa.

== Corporate structure ==
Advanzia Bank operates as a Société Anonyme (SA), a public limited company according to Luxembourg law. Its business purpose involves executing banking transactions, especially issuing credit cards, granting loans to credit card holders and handling cash deposits.

Advanzia Bank is owned by private investors. The majority of its shares, a total of about 60%, have been owned by Norwegian company Kistefos since 2006, and they list Advanzia bank as a consolidated business in their financial statements.

== See also ==
- List of banks in Luxembourg
