= HuffPost Live =

Former video streaming network

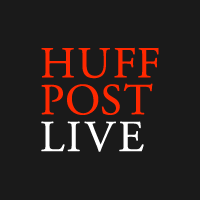
- Type: Internet streaming
- Country: United States
- Revenue: $243.79 thousand
- Owner: The Huffington Post Media Group
- Key people: Roy Sekoff, Former president and co-creator
- Launch date: August 13, 2012; 14 years ago
- Official website: HuffPost Video

HuffPost Live was an Internet-based video streaming network run by HuffPost, a news website in the United States. The network produced original programming as well as live conversations among users via platforms such as Skype and Google+. Live content was previously streamed for eight hours each weekday, from 10 a.m. to 6 p.m. EST. Instead of the usual TV news format of individual shows, the network was divided into shorter segments covering an individual story or topic from the parent website as well as other segments pertaining to a specific part of the site itself, such as politics, money, front page, and the like.

It launched on August 13, 2012. On January 8, 2016, Arianna Huffington announced that HuffPost Live would be scaled back to reorganize The Huffington Post's video strategy toward more shareable online content. Ever since this reorganization, HuffPost Live's programming has consisted of rerun content from previous truly live shows combined with a varying number of new live celebrity interviews per day before the cessation of new live content on March 28, 2016.

== History ==
The Huffington Post co-founder Arianna Huffington announced plans in February 2012 to launch a "breakthrough project" in a blog post to mark a year since the news website was acquired by AOL. The project, then called "HuffPost Streaming Network", was described by Huffington as a "more relaxed, more free-flowing, and much more spontaneous and interactive" platform to disseminate content, unlike television. The project was later renamed "HuffPost Live". Huffington Post founding editor Roy Sekoff and Gabriel Lewis, head of AOL Studios, co-created and developed the project. The third member of the senior management team is Mitch Semel, Executive Editor of HuffPost Live. Sekoff described it as "CNN meets YouTube". He said the project intends to take advantage of the Huffington Post's "engaged" community which produced 54 million comments on the site in 2011.

The company held a demonstration to showcase the interactive components of the network on February 2, 2012 at a press conference in Manhattan. During the press conference, Huffington noted that the network will launch with 100-strong staff.

The site launched on August 13, 2012 with Verizon and Cadillac listed as founding partners.

In December 2014, HuffPost Live and Kosiner Venture Capital made an application to the Canadian Radio-Television and Telecommunications Commission to bring the service to conventional television in Canada.

Beginning on January 11, 2016 the live portion of HuffPost Live was significantly scaled back as a part of a reorganization effort announced on January 8, 2016. HuffPost Live's programming is now made up of mostly old content being re-aired. The live component continues to exist, though the emphasis on news and politics has been removed, instead being replaced with a few celebrity interviews per day at scheduled times.

On March 25, 2016 HuffPost Live aired its final segment, an interview with Ric Flair and Charlotte Flair. As a replacement, the same format will be attempted utilizing Facebook's new Facebook Live feature. The first segment, under the HuffPost Entertainment Facebook Page, featured Tom Hiddleston and Wrenn Schmidt being interviewed by Caroline Modarressy-Tehrani on the HuffPost Live set but featured no branding and utilized a single roving camera rather than the previous multi-camera format.

== Former hosts ==
- Alyona Minkovski
- Caroline Modarressy-Tehrani
- Josh Zepps
- Marc Lamont Hill
- Nancy Redd
- Ricky Camilleri
- Caitlyn Becker
- Janet Varney

== Content ==
In its restructured format, HuffPost Live only covered celebrity interviews, select segments and special live events. HuffPost Live formerly featured 8 hours of daily programming for five days a week, on-demand, on mobile and online. Currently, programming only features previously aired segments.

Since its launch, HuffPost Live concentrated on driving viewer engagement. “The news is no longer about a few people telling everyone else what happened—it's about everyone telling everyone what's happening right now. And now. And now… This shift from presentation to participation is what fuels HuffPost Live,” said Huffington Post in the launch press release. Segments often feature viewers and other members of the Huffington Post universe, including reporters and members of the Huffington Post community. Segments are open to participants joining the conversation via webcam, smart phones and tablet computers using Skype, Google+ and other video communication platforms. Programming is produced from AOL/Huffington Post studios in New York City. Although there was initially a staff in Los Angeles as well, the LA production site was shut down on Aug 30, 2013, with some of the LA staff relocating to NY. The live stream is interrupted by promos for HuffPost Live after which a still promoting the next program replaces the video for the ongoing program. The viewer must click on the website to get the video back.

Advertising on the network consists of pre-roll commercials on video-on-demand clips. The network is also backed by "premium" sponsors that will integrate their advertising into the network's content.

Videos produced by HuffPost Live are available on over-the-top services including Boxee, Roku, PlayStation 3 and Apple TV.

== Awards ==
2012: Mashable's "Biggest Innovation in Media"

2013: Webby Awards – News & Information Channel; The Webbys – Media Streaming (Nominee); Tellys – Online Video, News Features (Bronze); Appy – Entertainment: Professional Content; Cine Golden Eagle – Original Digital Division, Non-Fiction – Documentary; NABJ – Digital Media Interactive: News – Chicago Killing Field

2014: Digiday – Best Video Platform; Gracie – Outstanding Online Producer, "Special Series on Gun Violence"; The Webbys – News & Information Channel; EPPY Award – Best Webcast

== HuffPost Live Conversations ==
HuffPost Live Conversations is an hour-long program featuring HuffPost Live interviews with celebrities, politicians, journalists and more. Episodes are available for viewing on Hulu, through a partnership that launched on November 10, 2014. Every day, new episodes of HuffPost Live Conversations are added to HuffPost Live's page on Hulu and airs twice a day on MGM's diginet. The Works, where the programming is formatted into a two-hour block, features a wide-ranging mix of contents ranging from politics, entertainment, to international news.
