= Luxembourg for Finance =

Financial agency

- La place financiere de Luxembourg
- Abbreviation: LLF
- Formation: 2008; 18 years ago
- Legal status: Public-private partnership
- Headquarters: Luxembourg-Kirchberg
- Location: Luxembourg
- Key people: Nicolas Mackel, CEO
- Website: www.luxembourgforfinance.com

Luxembourg for Finance is an agency dedicated to the promotion and development of Luxembourg's Financial Centre. The agency is a public-private partnership between the government of Luxembourg and Luxembourg Financial Industry Federation. It brings together the various trade bodies of the Luxembourg financial sector including Luxembourg Banker’s Association, the Association of the Luxembourg Fund Industry, and the Association of Insurance and Reinsurance Companies

== History ==
Founded in 2008, the objective of Luxembourg for Finance is to help develop and diversify Luxembourg’s financial services industry, position the financial centre abroad, and identify new business opportunities. It connects international investors to the range of financial services provided in Luxembourg, such as investment funds, wealth management, capital market operations, and advisory services.

== Rankings ==
Luxembourg Financial Centre has been ranked as the leading financial centre in the Eurozone and 3rd in Europe after London and Zurich.
