= Social welfare in Luxembourg =

Luxembourg has an extensive welfare system. It comprises social security, health, and pension funds. The labour market is highly regulated, and Luxembourg is a corporatist welfare state. Enrollment is mandatory in one of the welfare schemes for any employed person. Luxembourg's social security system is the Centre Commun de la Securite Sociale (CCSS). Both employees and employers make contributions to the fund at a rate of 25% of total salary, which cannot eclipse more than five times the minimum wage. Social spending accounts for 21.9% of GDP.

== Statistics ==
Luxembourg scores highly in the Human Development Index, a measure that takes into account educational attainment, life expectancy, and per capita income. The country has a relatively low GINI coefficient, a measure of income inequality. The country's per capita income is $117,700 as of 2022, one of the highest in the world. It offers one of the highest replacement rates in the OECD owing in part to immigration. This has ensured a steady stream of contributors into the system. There are some strains on the system, such as high youth unemployment with 16.3% of males, and 14.1% of females between the ages of 15–24 not participating in the labor force. Luxembourg has a low birth rate with a fertility rate of 1.63 children born per woman. The number of contributors has steadily increased relative to the number of pensioners which is helping to ensure the system's long-term solvency. As of 2024, 47.2% of the country's population are foreigners. Only one-quarter of the country's labor force are Luxembourgers, with the rest being foreigners residing in Luxembourg and those commuting from the neighboring countries of Germany, Belgium, and France. The rate of immigration has increased from 36.34% in 2008 to 48.08% in 2022.

== Welfare programs ==
The social welfare system comprises many benefits, namely maternity, illness, work-related accidents, pension, disability, basic minimum income, child and family benefits, survivors' insurance, early retirement, and long-term care insurance. The broad entitlement programs of Luxembourg's citizens are managed by the state. The pension scheme has multiple types of users: children (orphans), the disabled, surviving partners, and insured elderly. Since 2009, the National Insurance Fund has taken over activities of four pension funds from the general social welfare system scheme: the Old-age and Invalidity Retirement Fund, Retirement Fund for Skilled Workers, Retirement for Private Employees, and the Agricultural Retirement Fund. The childcare benefits give monthly payments to families depending on the number of children they have, and birth allowances allow three payments to women who have met the compulsory medical visits.
