= The Integrated Traffic and Landscape Concept for the Grand Duchy of Luxembourg =

The integrated traffic and landscape concept is a spatial development plan which has been created in order to improve the spatial framework in terms of housing, economy, landscape and traffic in Luxembourg. It was introduced in the year 2004 and has a long-term perspective with a horizon of 2020. This concept has been developed by several Luxembourgish governmental ministries in cooperation with other spatial planning agencies.

== Conceptualization of the IVL ==
The IVL has been developed by several Luxembourgish Ministries including the Ministries of Interior, Transport, Public Buildings, Environment, Housing and Economy. The national administration of road construction was also involved in the conceptualization process. Several other stakeholders were included in the IVL development, including the CIAT (Inter ministerial committee of spatial development), the CSAT (Superior council of spatial development) and the Syvicol (Syndic of Luxembourgish towns and municipalities). The conceptualization has been debated during four different workshops by several international groups of experts.

== Implementation strategy ==
In order to implement the IVL strategy, the Luxembourgish government focuses on several important municipalities around which urban development is predicted to increase. This action avoids further urban sprawl in the rural areas of Luxembourg by planning growth in those municipalities located near main transport arteries. It is hoped to increase the number of people using public transportation.

== Possibilities ==
Two future scenarios for Luxembourg are well documented in the IVL. The first scenario is the 'cross-border commuter scenario,' in which most jobs created in the future will be held by foreign residents who do not live in Luxembourg but travel to it each day from their respective countries. The second scenario is the so-called 'inhabitant scenario,' in which most jobs created in the future will be held by people who reside in Luxembourg.

== Spatial models ==
Based on the two future scenarios for Luxembourg, the IVL describes five additional models for a sustainable spatial development. The first model presented in the IVL is the ‘Laissez-faire’ model, which doesn't indicate any changes which should be implemented in order to change the spatial development in Luxembourg. The second possibility reveals a model which concentrates only on Luxembourg-city. Another model follows the ‘Main traffic axes’ scenario, which indicates a higher urban settlement in the future around the main traffic axes and next to good public transport connections. Another model is the so-called ‘Tripol’, which focuses the concentration of working and housing possibilities on the three main urban areas in Luxembourg: Esch-sur-Alzette, Luxembourg-city and the Nordstad. The last model is the ‘Region centers’ model, which is based on a number of municipalities that should increase their population and attractiveness in order to represent urban centers for the several regions of Luxembourg.
