= Ocean Group International =

Private holding company

- Company type: Private
- Available in: English
- Founded: 2005
- Area served: Worldwide
- Founders: Timur Sardarov; Oliver Ripley
- Website: oceangroup.com

Ocean Group International is a private holding company founded in 2005. Ocean Group's activities include aviation, agriculture, corporate finance and fiduciary services, real estate, Internet, and mining. Geographically, the company is active in Europe, the United States, and Russia. It focuses on the investment, creation, and hands-on operations of new businesses and the acquisition and restructuring of existing businesses in high-growth sectors. The business was set up by entrepreneurs Timur Sardarov and Oliver Ripley.

The group's companies included Ocean Sky UK, a jet air charter company in Europe. Ocean Sky sponsored the James Bond movie Quantum of Solace, one of the largest film sponsorships in history. Ocean Sky UK was liquidated in 2012.

The other companies inside Ocean Group include Natural Farming Ltd, a farming business operating arable and dairy operations in Southern Russia, and Black Ocean Group, a technology and Internet holding company, active in operating and building companies in high growth-markets, comprising sectors spanning video, e-commerce, and social networking.
