= Roy Sekoff =

Roy Sekoff is the founding editor of The Huffington Post. He was born and raised in Coral Gables, Florida.

Before helping launch The Huffington Post, he was a writer, producer, and on-air correspondent for Michael Moore’s Emmy-winning TV Nation. Sekoff served as the head writer for the 2000 Shadow Conventions, and as Communications Director for Arianna Huffington’s 2003 gubernatorial campaign.

He has also worked as a screenwriter, penning scripts for 20th Century Fox, Universal Pictures, Disney, Caravan, and Sony Pictures. As a freelance journalist, his work has appeared in The Village Voice, The Times, Elle, Redbook, and Rock Magazine. His authorial debut, Lacks Self-Control: True Stories I Waited Until My Parents Died to Tell, releases June 2018.

Sekoff is a frequent guest on TV and radio shows, and has appeared on The Ed Show, The Joy Behar Show, Larry King Live, The O’Reilly Factor, Entertainment Tonight, and Anderson Cooper/360, among others.

In 2010, he was one of the executive producers of Freshmen, a pilot for ABC created by Greg Malins.

Sekoff is a graduate of Coral Gables Senior High School (Class of 1977). In college at the University of Miami, he was voted "Funniest Man on Campus". He starred in a "B" movie Animal-House-type comedy "King Frat" filmed in Miami and Coral Gables.
