= Reinet Investments =

Luxembourg-based investment company

Reinet Investments S.C.A.
- Type: Public
- Traded as: LuxSE: REIN
- Industry: Finance
- Founded: 20 October 2008; 17 years ago
- Headquarters: Luxembourg City, Luxembourg
- Area served: Luxembourg
- Key people: Johann Rupert (Chairman)
- Services: Investment; Private equity
- Website: reinet.com

Reinet Investments S.C.A., sometimes simply referred to as Reinet, is a Luxembourg-based investment vehicle that was demerged from the Swiss luxury goods company Richemont on 20 October 2008.

The company is listed on the Luxembourg Stock Exchange (LuxSE), and was the third-largest component of the LuxX Index in 2020.

== History ==
Upon formation, Reinet controlled €350m in cash, €50m in miscellaneous investments, and a 4% stake (84.3 million shares) in British American Tobacco (BAT). On the first day of Reinet trading, BAT's share price opened at £17.31, valuing Reinet's stake at £1.46bn (€1.88bn).

The formation of Reinet allowed the Rupert family to spin off all non-luxuries related activities, and allow Richemont to focus purely on its core investments.

In January 2009, Reinet entered into negotiations to purchase the private equity business of Lehman Brothers, which is now known as Trilantic Capital Partners.

== Investment Strategy ==
Reinet states that its investment strategy is to take a long-term view of investment opportunities, to invest in a wide range of asset classes (including listed and unlisted equities, bonds, real estate and derivative instruments), while emphasis will at all times be on the protection of shareholders' capital.

== See also ==
- Lehman Brothers Merchant Banking
