= Luxempart =

Luxempart S.A.
- Type: Public
- Traded as: LuxSE: LXMPR
- Industry: Finance
- Founded: 25 April 1988
- Headquarters: 12, rue Léon Laval, Leudelange, Luxembourg
- Services: Investment, private equity
- Website: www.luxempart.lu

Luxempart is a Luxembourg investment company listed on the Luxembourg Stock Exchange under the ticker symbol LXMPR. The company specialises in direct investments, primarily in Luxembourg, Belgium, France and Germany, as well as investments in private equity funds. It is one of the companies included in the LuxX Index, the benchmark index of the Luxembourg Stock Exchange.

== History ==
Luxempart was founded in Luxembourg on 25 April 1988. The company has been listed on the Luxembourg Stock Exchange since 1992. It is one of the companies included in the LuxX Index, the benchmark index of the Luxembourg Stock Exchange.

== Headquarters and locations ==
Luxempart's registered office is located in Leudelange, Luxembourg. The group also has offices in Paris, France, and Munich, Germany.

== Activities and strategy ==
Luxempart organises its investment activities around two main pillars:

Direct Investments: majority or active minority investments in listed or privately held companies, generally ranging from €25 million to €100 million per investment. The company primarily targets France, the Benelux region, the DACH region (Germany, Austria and Switzerland) and Northern Italy. It does not have a strict sector focus, although it has particular exposure to financial services and insurance, telecommunications, security, healthcare and industrial companies.

Investment Funds: commitments to private equity funds, including buyout, growth equity, venture capital and secondary strategies. These investments are mainly focused on Europe and North America and are managed by third-party investment teams with which Luxempart seeks to establish long-term relationships.

== Governance ==
Luxempart is governed by a Board of Directors, supported by a Group Executive Committee, which assists with the day-to-day management of the company under the responsibility of the Managing Director.

The Board of Directors is supported by three permanent specialised committees:

the Audit, Compliance and Risk Committee; the Nomination and Remuneration Committee; the Sustainability Committee.

== Stock exchange listing ==
Luxempart shares are traded on the Luxembourg Stock Exchange under the ticker symbol LXMPR and the ISIN LU2605908552.
