= Luxembourg Stock Exchange =

Stock exchange located in Luxembourg

- Bourse de Luxembourg; Bourse vu Lëtzebuerg; Börse Luxemburg

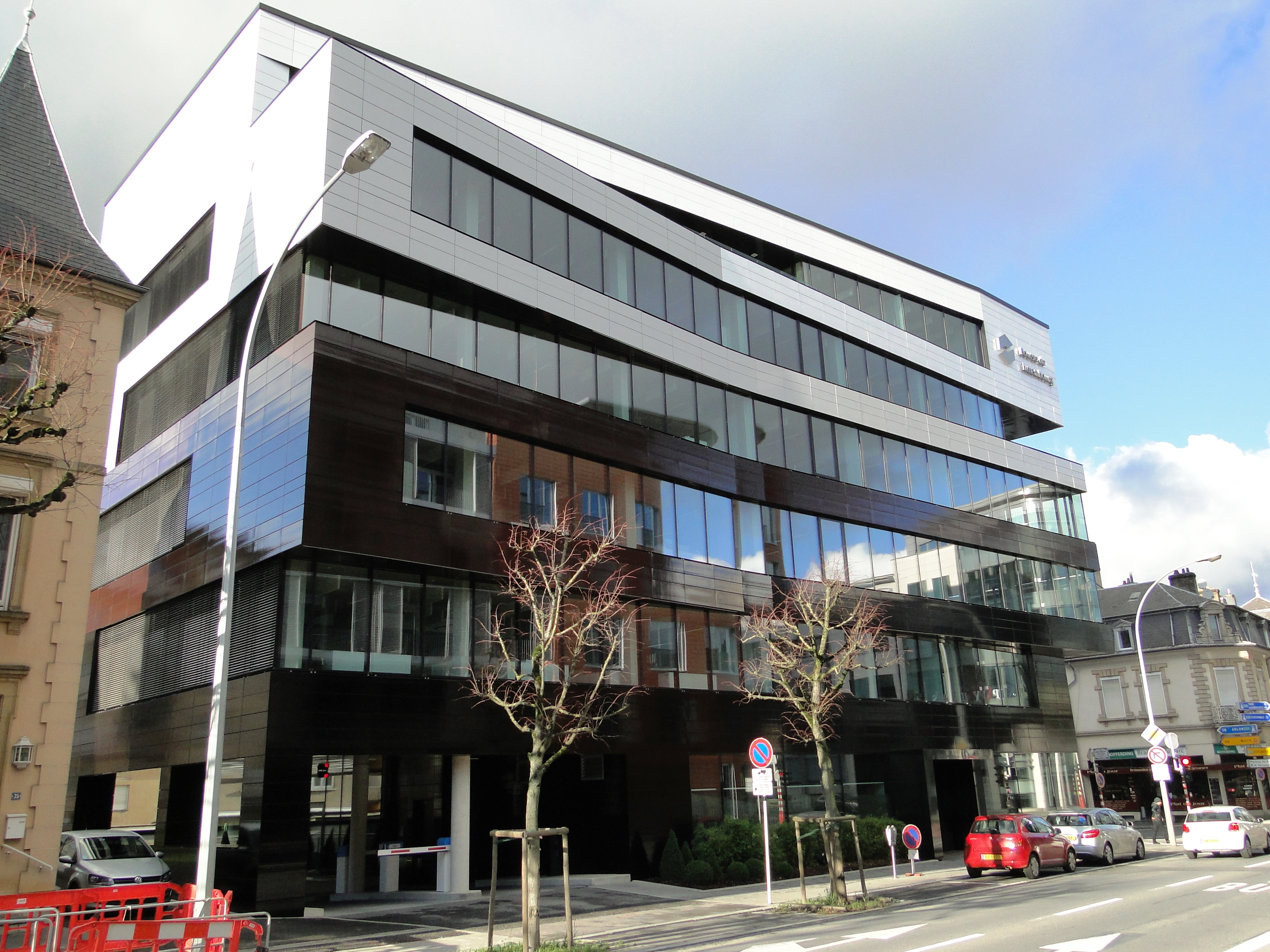
- Type: Stock Exchange
- Location: Luxembourg City, Luxembourg
- Coordinates: 49°36′46.0″N 06°07′14.5″E
- Founded: 5 April 1928
- Owner: Société de la Bourse de Luxembourg S.A.
- Key people: Alain Kinsch (Chairman); Julie Becker (CEO)
- No. of listings: 49,994 (31 December 2025)
- Market cap: €80.76 billion (12 August 2026)
- Indices: LuxX Index, Lux General Price, Lux GDRs India, Lux GDRs Taiwan, Lux RI Fund Index
- Website: https://www.luxse.com/

The Luxembourg Stock Exchange (LuxSE; French: Bourse de Luxembourg) is based in Luxembourg City at 35A boulevard Joseph II.

The chairman of the board is Alain Kinsch and the chief executive officer is Julie Becker.

== History ==
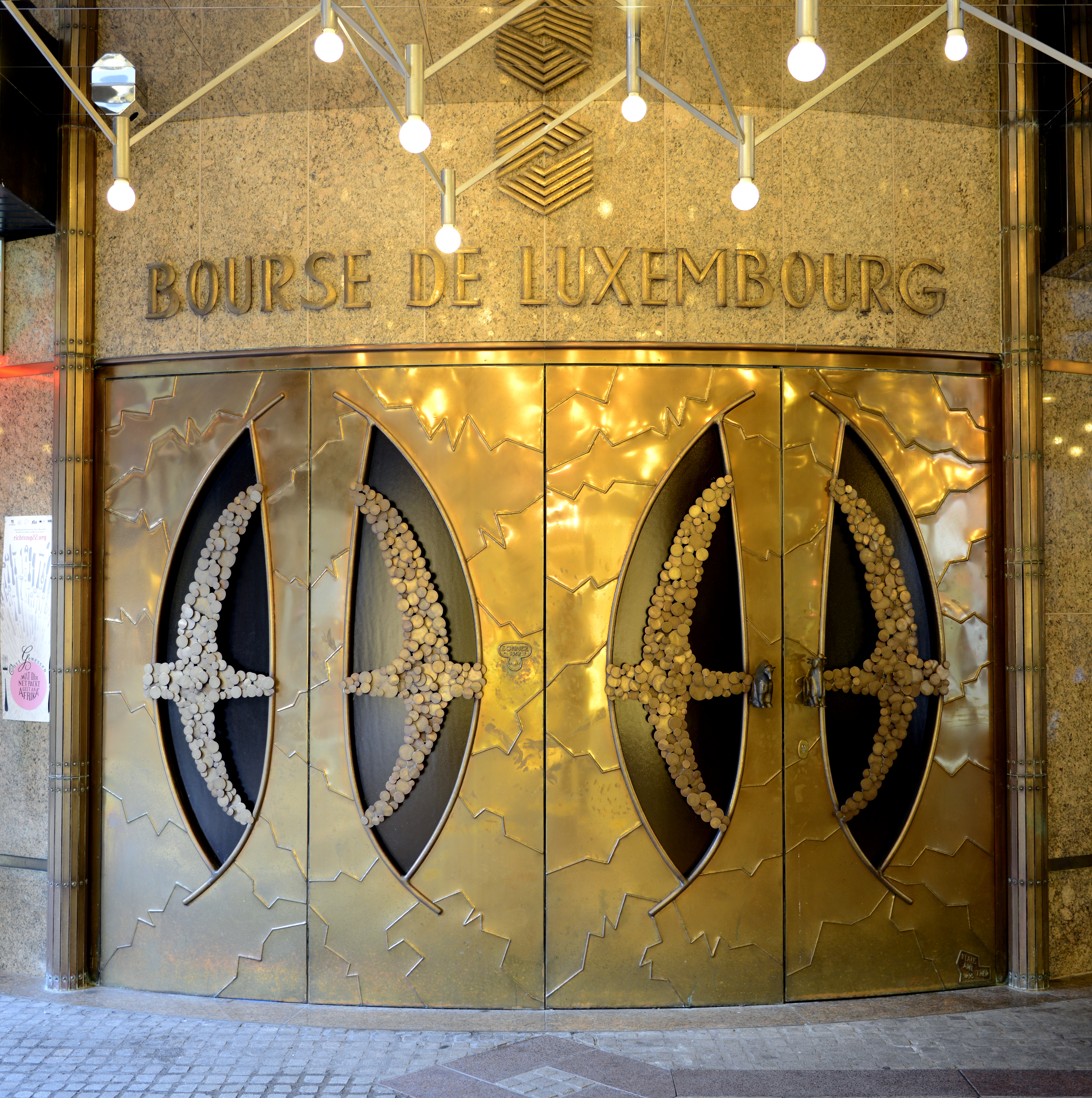
Entrance of the Bourse de Luxembourg at its former location

A law establishing a stock exchange in Luxembourg was passed on 30 January 1927. The company was incorporated as Société Anonyme de la Bourse de Luxembourg on 5 April 1928, with an initial issue of 7,000 shares, each valued at 1000 francs.^{[10]}

In March 2014, LuxSE moved to its new headquarters – the Aurora building– erected in line with the green construction concept.

In 2015, the exchange celebrated the 10th anniversary of its Euro MTF Market.

== Agreements with other exchanges ==
In November 2000, LuxSE signed a cooperation agreement with Euronext. As part of the agreement, trades in Luxembourg are generated through Euronext's Universal Trading Platform (UTP) allowing existing Euronext members to activate a cross-membership status on LuxSE.

On January 13, 2020 Chongwa (Macau) Financial Assets Exchange Co., Ltd. and the Luxembourg Stock Exchange signed a memorandum of understanding on cooperation in Macau. The two parties will carry out two-way bond listing, assets and investment funds and other cooperation to promote cross-border investment and offshore Liquidity in the RMB bond market.

On 23 August 2023, the company formed EuroCTP as a joint venture with 13 other bourses, in an effort to provide a consolidated tape for the European Union, as part of the Capital Markets Union proposed by the European Commission.

== Exchange members ==
As of August 2016, the LuxSE has 53 members of which 28 have a trading status. There are nine approved market makers.

== Bonds ==
The Luxembourg Stock Exchange specialises primarily in the listing of international bonds, in which it ranks first in Europe with 25,831 debt securities listed as of August 2016.^{[2]} In 1963, with the issue of Italian Autostrade bonds, it became the first exchange globally to list a Eurobond, an international bond denominated in a currency not native to the country where it was issued.^{[2]} To this day, Luxembourg has maintained a dominant position in European bond issues with approximately 40% of all cross-border securities in Europe listed in Luxembourg.^{[3]}

Over 70 countries list at least some of their sovereign debt in Luxembourg. Luxembourg is also a preferred debt market for supranational entities such as the European Bank for Reconstruction and Development, European Commission, European Investment Bank and World Bank.^{[2]}

In 2007, the LuxSE was the first stock exchange in the world to list a bond labelled green, i.e. a "climate awareness bond" ^{[4]} issued by the European Investment Bank. In 2015, the Exchange listed green bonds worth $11.7 billion, followed by a $9.6 billion-worth issuance in the first seven months of 2016.

== Luxembourg Green Exchange ==
In September 2016, LuxSE became the first stock exchange globally to introduce a platform for green financial instruments – the Luxembourg Green Exchange (LGX). LGX gathers issuers that dedicate 100% of the raised funding to green investments. It requires green securities to adhere to strict eligibility criteria, including:

- Declaring the security green, based on the ICMA GBP or CBI taxonomy, or equivalent. During the application process the issuer has to clearly state the intended green nature of the security.
- Use of proceeds. Clear disclosure that the proceeds are exclusively used for financing or refinancing projects that are 100% green, according to the GBP or CBI eligibility taxonomy.
- Ex-ante review and ex-post reporting. Issuer's commitment to provide both independent external review and ex-post reporting.

As of January 2017, LGX displays green securities worth over EUR 45 billion, including the world's first sovereign green bond issued by the Republic of Poland. As of January 2018, LGX accounted for 50% of the world's green bond market, which represent 1% of the global debt market.

== Equities ==
The Luxembourg Stock Exchange's main company shares index is the LuxX Index – a weighted index of nine most valuable stocks by free float market capitalisation.^{[9]} The index was fixed at 1,000 on 4 January 1999, the first trading day after Luxembourg adopted the Euro.^{[9]} The nine companies currently composing the listing are:

Company	Industry	Country	Weighting
Aperam ne	Metals	LUX	15.82%
ArcelorMittal	Steel	LUX	20.04%
Brederode	Investment	LUX	4.56%
Luxempart	Investment	LUX	3.69%
Reinet Investments	Investment	LUX	14.40%
RTL Group	Media	LUX	20.63%
SES	Telecommunications	LUX	19.55%
Socfinaf	Resource extraction	LUX	0.68%
Socfinasia	Resource extraction	LUX	0.59%
Source: Luxembourg Stock Exchange

== Trading hours ==
The exchange has pre-opening sessions from 7:15 am to 9:00 am and normal trading sessions from 9:00 am to 5:35 pm from Monday to Friday included, except for holidays declared by the Exchange in advance.
