= Politics of Luxembourg =

- Coat of arms of Luxembourg
- Polity type: Parliamentary constitutional monarchy
- Constitution: Constitution of Luxembourg

Legislative branch
- Name: Chamber of Deputies
- Type: Unicameral
- Meeting place: Hôtel de la Chambre

Executive branch
- Head of state
- Title: Monarch
- Currently: Guillaume V
- Head of government
- Title: Prime Minister
- Currently: Luc Frieden
- Cabinet
- Name: Council of Government
- Leader: Prime Minister

Judicial branch
- Name: Judiciary of Luxembourg
- Superior Court of Justice
- Constitutional Court

Luxembourg is a parliamentary representative democratic monarchy, whereby the prime minister is the head of government, and the multi-party system. Executive power is under the constitution of 1868, as amended, exercised by the government, by the grand duke and the Council of Government (cabinet), which consists of a prime minister and several other ministers. Usually, the prime minister is the leader of the political party or coalition of parties having the most seats in parliament. Legislative power is vested in both the government and parliament. The judiciary is independent of the executive and the legislature.

Legislative power is vested in the Chamber of Deputies, elected directly to five-year terms.

The Economist Intelligence Unit rated Luxembourg a "full democracy" in 2022. According to the V-Dem Democracy indices Luxembourg was 2023 the 9th most electoral democratic country in the world.

== Recent political history ==
Since the end of World War II, the Christian Social People's Party (CSV) has been the senior partner in all governing coalitions with two exceptions: between 1974–79 (DP–LSAP coalition) and between 2013-2023 (DP–LSAP–Green coalition). The Catholic-oriented CSV resembles Christian democratic political parties in other West European nations, and enjoys broad popular support making it the strongest party in the country and the second strongest in those regions where it is not the "number one".

The Democratic Party (DP) is a social-liberal party, drawing support from self-employed persons, the business community and the urban upper-middle class. Like other West European liberal parties, it advocates a mixture of basic social legislation and minimum government involvement in the economy. It is strongly pro-NATO and defends the idea of a secular state in which religion should not play any role in public life. The DP had been a junior partner in coalition governments with the CSV in 1979–1984 and 1999–2004, and senior partner in a coalition government with the LSAP in 1974–1979. The traditional stronghold of the party is the City of Luxembourg, the Buergermeeschter (Mayor) of the nation's capital coming usually from the ranks of the DP.

The Luxembourg Socialist Workers' Party (LSAP) is a party of social-democratic orientation which has been a junior partner in most governments since 1974 either with the CSV in 1984–1999 and 2004–2013, or the Democratic Party in 1974–1979. Its stronghold lies in the industrial belt in the south of the country (the Minette Region, which is mainly the canton of Esch). Since the elections of October 2023 it has been in opposition.

The Greens have received growing support since it was officially formed in 1983. It opposes both nuclear weapons and nuclear power and supports environmental and ecological preservation measures. This party generally opposes Luxembourg's military policies, including its membership in the North Atlantic Treaty Organization.

The Alternative Democratic Reform Party (ADR) is a national conservative political party. It endorses a softly eurosceptic line and advocates and promotes intensely the preservation and use of the Luxembourgish language. It is sometimes described as a mildly populist right-wing party.

The Left is a democratic socialist party. It was formed in 1999. It won its first seat in the Chamber of Deputies in 1999. It currently holds two seats in the Chamber and has done so since 2013.

The Pirate Party Luxembourg was formed in October 2009. It won its first two seats in the Chamber of Deputies in 2018 with 6.45% of the vote.

The Communist Party (KPL), which received 10%–18% of the vote in national elections from World War II to the 1960s, won two seats in the 1984 elections, one in 1989, and none in 1994. The last election it won a seat in Luxembourg's national legislature was in 1999 with 3.3% of the vote. It lost this single seat in 2004 and has held no seats in Luxembourg's national legislature since. It also holds no seats in the EU Parliament. Its small remaining support lies in the heavily industrialised south.

In the June 2004 parliamentary elections, the CSV won 24 seats, the LSAP 14, the DP 10, the Greens 7, and the Alternative Democratic Reform Party 5. The Left and the Communist Party each lost its single seat in part due to their separate campaigns. The Democratic Party which had become the junior coalition partner in 1999 registered heavy losses. The long-reigning CSV was the main winner, partly due to the personal popularity of the prime minister Jean-Claude Juncker (CSV). In July 2004, it chose the LSAP as its coalition partner. Jean Asselborn (LSAP) was appointed as the Vice Prime Minister and Minister of Foreign Affairs and Immigration. In 2013, the CSV lost one seat (23 seats instead of 24).

A complete list of all governments is maintained on the website of the Government of Luxembourg.

In 2008, the bitter controversy over euthanasia had parliament pass a measure which would restrict the legislative veto powers of the grand duke, who had opposed the pro-euthanasia law on the grounds of his personal moral standards based on the Christian faith, a problem of private conscience very similar to what had occurred in Belgium in the early 1990s when King Baudouin expressed his opposition to a law liberalizing abortion.

In July 2013, Prime Minister Jean-Claude Juncker announced his resignation following a secret service scandal. He had been prime minister since 1995.

In December 2013, openly gay Xavier Bettel was sworn in as the new prime minister to succeed Juncker. Bettel of Democratic Party (DP), formed a coalition of Liberals, Social Democrats and Greens who won a combined majority of 32 out of 60 seats in Luxembourg's snap election on 20 October 2013. However, Juncker's Christian Democrats (CSV) remained the biggest party with 23 seats.

In July 2014, European Parliament elected former Luxembourg prime minister Jean-Claude Juncker as the President of the European Commission on 1 November 2014, succeeding Portugal's Jose Manuel Barroso, who had held the post since 2004.

In December 2018, Prime Minister Xavier Bettel was sworn in for a second term, following the narrow victory of his liberal-led coalition in 2018 parliamentary election.

On 12 July the Luxembourg Parliament supported the expansion of NATO.

In October 2023, the Christian Social People's Party (CSV) won the general election, meaning Prime Minister Xavier Bettel's ruling liberal coalition lost its clear majority. In November 2023, Luc Frieden, leader of CSV, became new Prime minister of Luxembourg. He formed a coalition with the liberal Democratic Party (DP), meaning outgoing Prime Minister Xavier Bettel remained in government as foreign minister and deputy prime minister.

== Executive branch ==
Main office-holders
| Office | Name | Party | Since |
|---|---|---|---|
| Grand Duke | Guillaume V | - | 3 October 2025 |
| Prime Minister | Luc Frieden | CSV | 17 November 2023 |
| Deputy Prime Minister | Xavier Bettel | DP | 17 November 2023 |

Luxembourg has a parliamentary form of government with a constitutional monarchy operating according to absolute primogeniture.

According to the constitution of 1868, executive power is exercised by the Grand Duke or Grand Duchess and the cabinet, which consists of a prime minister and a variable number of government branch ministers. The Grand Duke has the power to dissolve the legislature and reinstate a new one. However, since 1919, sovereignty has resided with the nation.

The monarchy is hereditary within the ruling dynasty of Luxembourg-Nassau.

The prime minister and vice prime minister are appointed by the monarch, following popular elections to the Chamber of Deputies. All government members are responsible to the Chamber of Deputies. The government is currently a coalition of the CSV and DP.

== Legislative branch ==
The Chamber of Deputies (Luxembourgish: D'Chamber; French: Chambre des Députés) has 60 members, elected for a five-year term by proportional representation in four multi-seat constituencies.

The Council of State (Luxembourgish: Staatsrot; French: Conseil d'État) is an advisory body composed of 21 citizens (usually politicians or senior public servants with good political ties) proposed, in order by the Government, Parliament and the Council of State and appointed by the Grand Duke. Traditionally the heir of the throne is also one of its members. Its role is to advise the Chamber of Deputies as well as the Government in the drafting of legislation and government regulations. The function of the councilor ends after a continuous or discontinuous period of twelve years or when the relevant person reaches the age of seventy-two. The responsibilities of the members of the Council of State are extracurricular to their normal professional duties.

== Judicial branch ==
Luxembourgish civil law is based upon the Code Napoléon with numerous updates, modernization, and modifications. The apex of the judicial system is the Superior Court of Justice (Luxembourgish: Iewechte Geriichtshaff; French: Cour Supérieure de Justice), whose judges are appointed by the Grand Duke. The same goes for the Administrative Court (Luxembourgish: Verwaltungsgeriicht; French: Cour Administrative).

== Administrative divisions ==
The Grand Duchy is divided into twelve cantons:

- Luxembourg/Lëtzebuerg
- Esch-Sur-Alzette
- Capellen
- Remich/Réimech
- Grevenmacher/Gréiwemaacher
- Echternach/Iechternach
- Mersch/Miersch
- Redange/Réiden
- Diekirch/Dikrech
- Wiltz/Wolz
- Clervaux/Klierf
- Vianden/Veianen

Two judicial districts:

- Diekirch/Dikrech
- Luxembourg/Lëtzebuerg

Four electoral constituencies (multi-seated):

- North/Norden/Nord
- East/Osten/Est
- Centre/Zentrum
- South/Süden/Sud

== Military ==
Luxembourg's contribution to its defense and to NATO consists of a small but well-equipped army of volunteers of Luxembourgish and foreign nationality. Its operational headquarters are at the Haerebierg Military Center in Diekirch.

Being a landlocked country, it has no navy. It also has no air force. According to an agreement with neighboring Belgium, its airspace is protected by the Belgian Air Force. Also, 18 NATO Airborne Warning And Control System (AWACS) airplanes are registered as aircraft of Luxembourg based on a decision of the NATO Authorities.

== International organization membership ==
Luxembourg is a member of ACCT, Australia Group, Benelux, CE, EAPC, EBRD, ECE, EIB, EMU, EU, FAO, IAEA, IBRD, ICAO, ICCt, ICC, ICRM, IDA, IEA, IFAD, IFC, IFRCS, ILO, IMF, IMO, Intelsat, Interpol, IOC, IOM, ISO, ITU, ITUC, NATO, NEA, NSG, OECD, OPCW, OSCE, PCA, UN, UNCTAD, UNESCO, UNIDO, UPU, WCO, WEU, WHO, WIPO, WMO, WTrO, and the Zangger Committee.

== See also ==
- List of political parties in Luxembourg
- Foreign relations of Luxembourg
- History of Luxembourg (1984—present)
