= History of Luxembourg (1984—present) =

Luxembourg — Contemporary Era
- 1984–present
Postwar Luxembourg (1945—1984), World War II
- Abdication of Grand Duke Henri (left) in favour of his son Guillaume V at the Chamber of Deputies, 3 October 2025
- Location: Luxembourg
- Monarch(s): Jean; Henri; Guillaume V
- Prime Minister(s): Jacques Santer; Jean-Claude Juncker; Xavier Bettel; Luc Frieden

The recent history of Luxembourg (1984—present) began with the 1984 general election, which saw Jacques Santer take office as prime minister.

Major economic and social changes took place during this time. The steel industry, still significant at the beginning of the period, continued its decline from the 1970s and steadily lost importance in the wider economy.

At the same time, the period saw the rapid rise of the banking and financial sector, and of services in general, taking a dominant role in place of steel. This led to social changes, such as the massively increased role of cross-border commuters in the economy, and a substantial rise in the number of foreign residents, attracted by opportunities in its finance sector and by the small country's many international institutions.

Politically, the period saw great stability in governments. From 1984 to 2023, there were only three prime ministers (Jacques Santer, Jean-Claude Juncker, and Xavier Bettel), each in office for at least 10 years. The Christian Social People's Party (CSV) broadly speaking continued its post-World War II dominance of the country's political scene, as the major coalition partner in all governments of the 1984–present period, with the notable exception of the 2013-2023 Bettel governments, when the CSV was in opposition.

Luxembourg continued to become ever more involved in European integration during the period, with Santer (1995-1999) and Juncker (2014-2019) each serving as President of the European Commission. In terms of wages and industrial relations, the "Luxembourg model" and the tradition of consensus, illustrated by the Tripartite Committee between government, employers and trade unions, remained in effect. Despite the CSV's general dominance, the period saw wide-ranging social reforms in areas such as same-sex marriage, euthanasia, abortion, and church-state relations.

== Monarchy ==
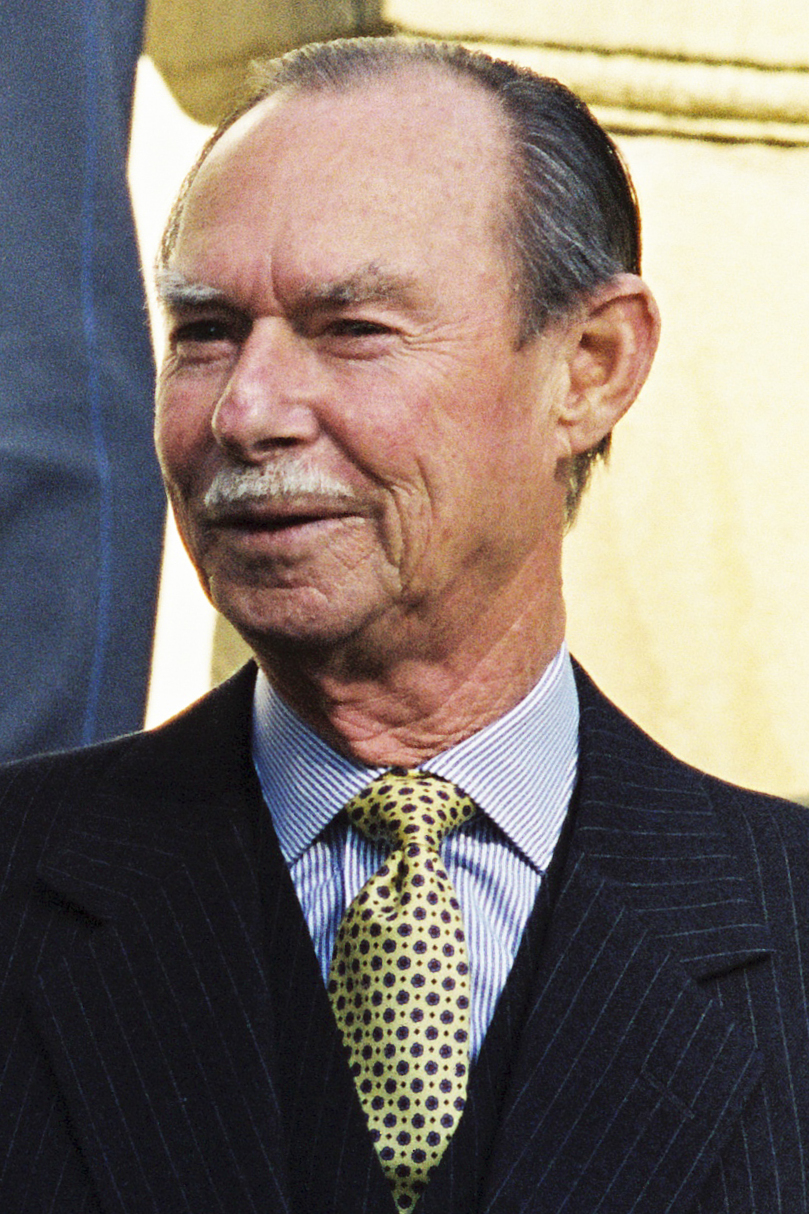
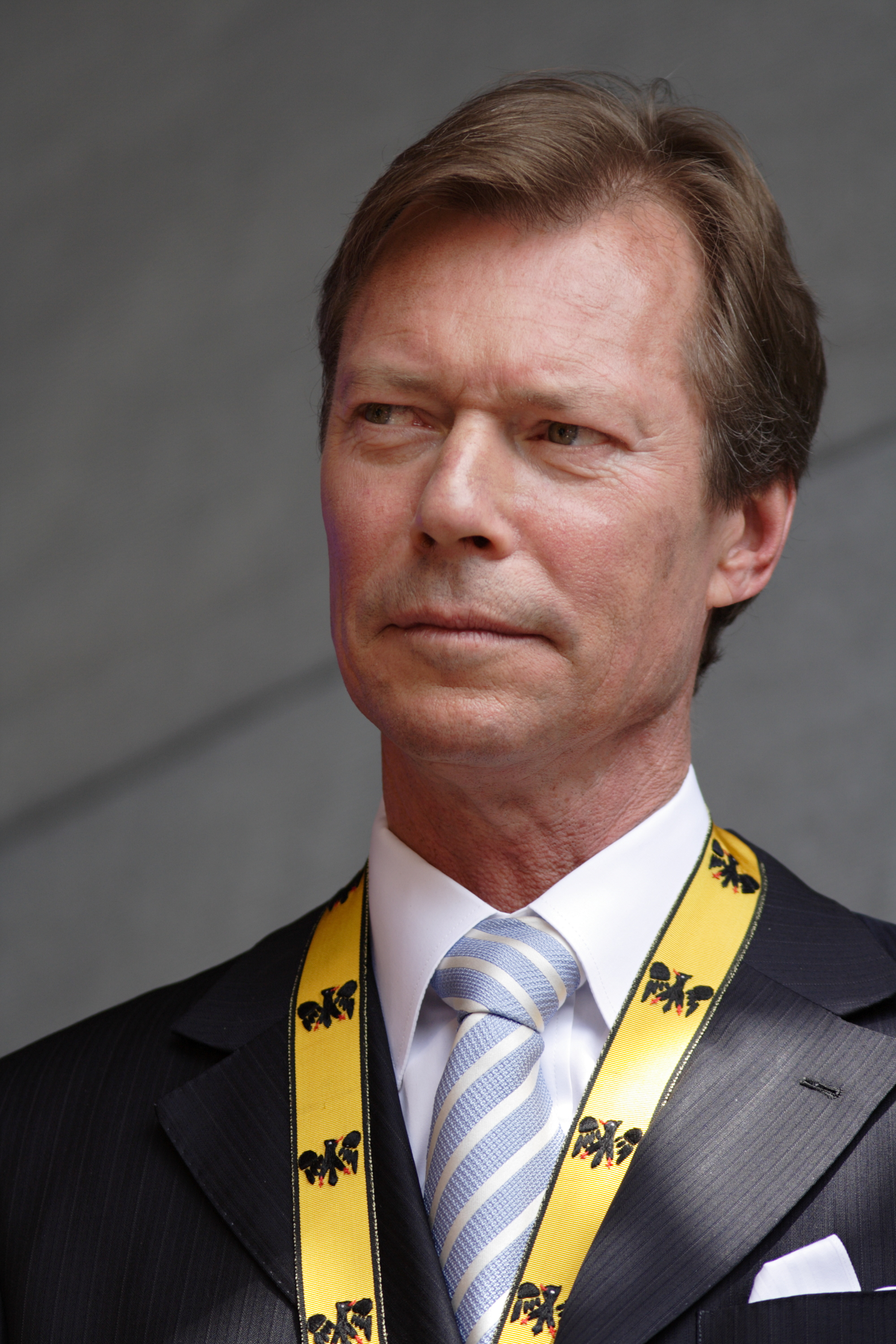
Grand Dukes Jean (left), Henri (middle), and Guillaume V (right)

Grand Duke Jean had been the monarch since 1964 when he succeeded his mother, Charlotte. On 24 December 1999, he announced his decision to abdicate the Luxembourgish throne in favour of his son, Henri, who had already served as regent since 4 March 1998. Henri was sworn in as Grand Duke on 7 October 2000, ending the 36-year reign of Jean, over which Luxembourg had seen major transformations.

In 2008, when the legislature passed a law decriminalising euthanasia, a major constitutional crisis threatened to materialise, as Grand Duke Henri announced that he could not in conscience give his assent to this law. This was averted through the adoption in that month of an amendment to the Constitution that removed the need for the Grand Duke's assent to legislation altogether, ending his role in the legislating process.

During his Christmas address in 2024, Henri announced his pending abdication from the throne of Luxembourg. He abdicated on 3 October 2025, and was succeeded by his eldest son, Guillaume V.

== Politics ==
=== 1984 election and political changes ===
The mid-1980s, and the 1984 election specifically, saw several changes to Luxembourg's political landscape. Pierre Werner, the long-running CSV prime minister, stepped down at the election. The CSV maintained its status as the biggest party. Its coalition partner the DP lost only one seat, which was however their first electoral decline in 20 years. The LSAP jumped from 14 to 21 seats — a huge increase — putting it close to the CSV's tally of 25. This was partly due to the LSAP's newly-found unity and the end of its competitor, the Social Democratic Party.

The 1980s also saw the emergence of minor parties, with tiny seat numbers at first, which would however increase over the next decades. The 1984 election saw the first Green Deputies: the "Green Alternative Party", founded after campaigns in the 1970s against the Remerschen nuclear power plant planned by Gaston Thorn's LSAP-DP government, obtained two seats. The precursor of the Alternative Democratic Reform (ADR) party was founded in 1987, as a single-issue party campaigning on equality of state pensions between civil servants and others. They would receive 4 seats at the next election in 1989.

In another broad trend, from the middle of the decade, the CSV started to become less conservative and more centrist and ‘social’. The DP on the other hand returned to a classic form of economic liberalism. The LSAP, for its part moved in a less traditionally socialist direction and became more social democratic in outlook, reflecting broader changes happening in other socialist parties in Western Europe.

=== Santer-Poos: CSV-LSAP coalition ===
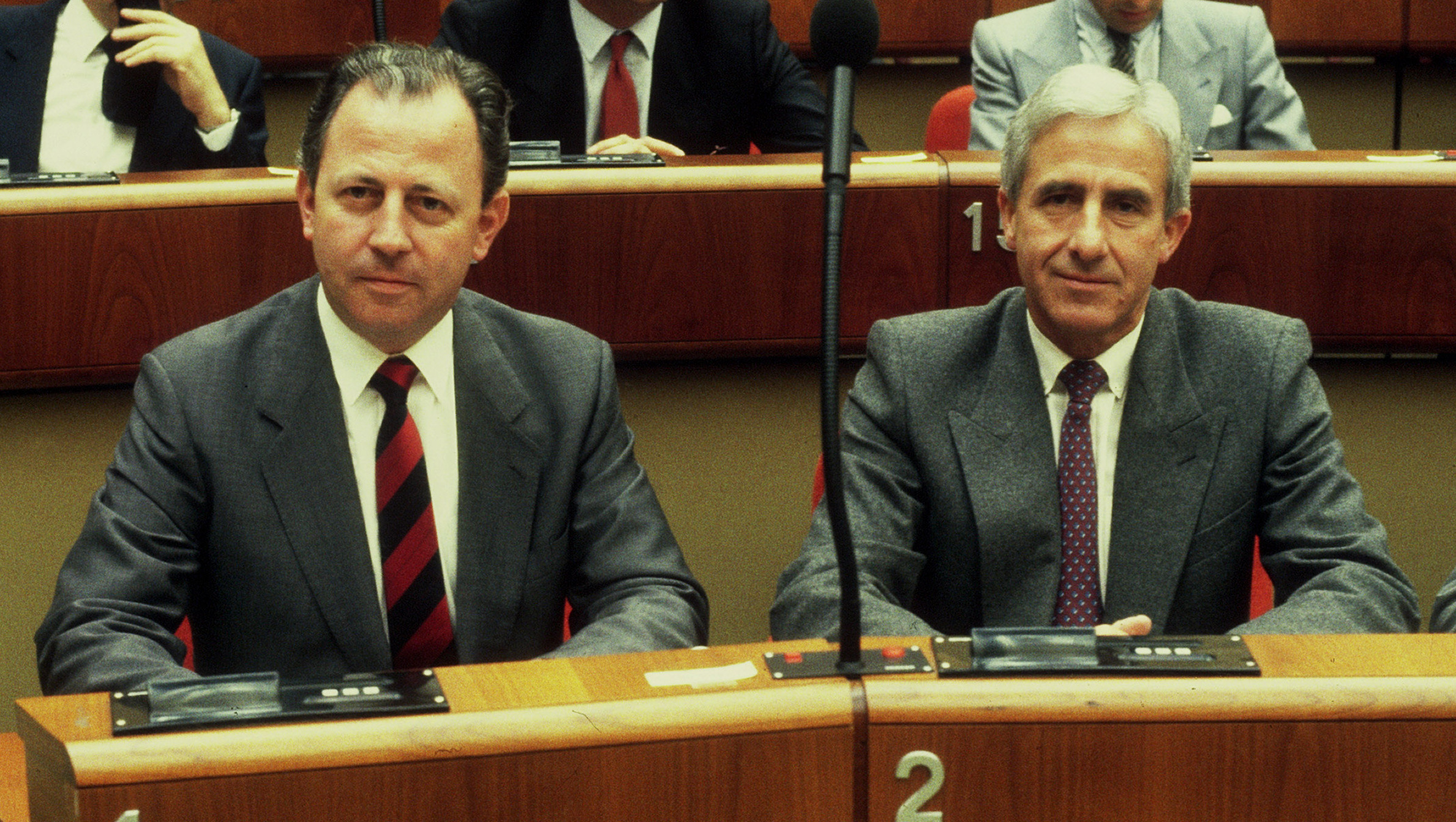
Jacques Santer (left) and Jacques Poos (right) led three successive CSV-LSAP coalition governments from 1984 to 1995.

The CSV's Jacques Santer formed a coalition with the newly strengthened LSAP, with the Socialist Jacques Poos as his deputy prime minister. The DP returned to opposition. The CSV-LSAP coalition was to govern Luxembourg until 1999.

==== Crisis management and social policy ====
The structural crisis of the steel industry remained a major economic challenge for the government, although there was some let-up. 1985 was the last of the crisis years: the late 1980s in Luxembourg saw a GDP boom, linked to the expansion of the financial centre and of the services sector generally. Growth rates reached a spectacular 10% in 1986 and 1989, and averaged 7% per year for 1985–1989. The slightly better economic outlook led the government to relax its austerity policy it had led since the beginning of the crisis. In 1984 and 1986 the government expanded the system of automatic indexation of wages and salaries.

By the 1990s, the future of the steel industry seemed assured in the medium term, albeit employment continued to decline in this industry sector. ARBED continued with its plan to improve productivity and refocus on its strategic activities.

In the social sphere, the government followed a policy aiming to strengthen national solidarity. It increased family allowances as well as pensions. Of particular note was the introduction of a guaranteed minimum income.

==== Economic diversification ====
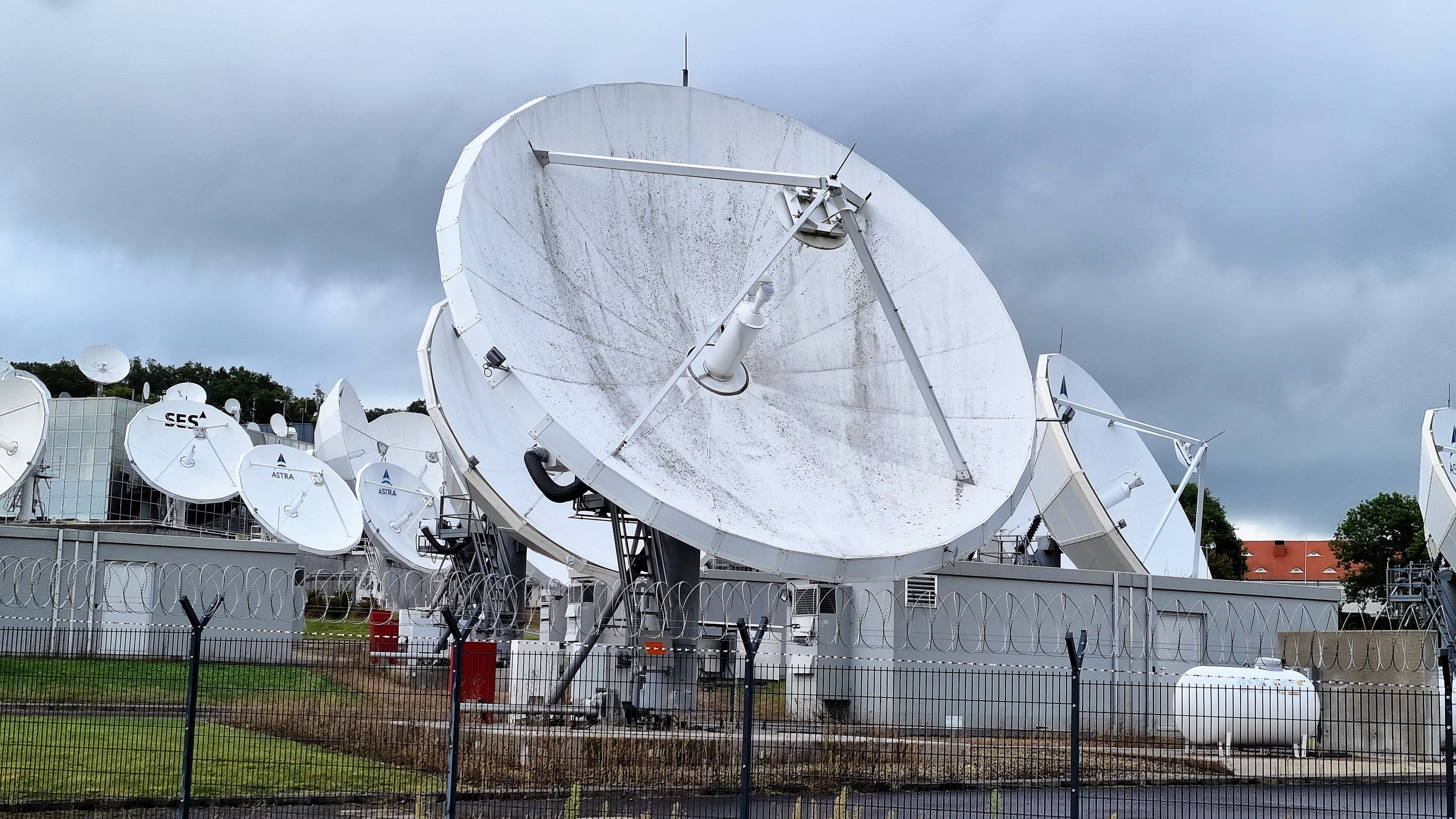
Uplink dishes at the SES headquarters in Betzdorf, Luxembourg

The CSV-LSAP government continued its predecessors' policy of diversification, to compensate for the decline of steel by promoting other branches. It set up a legal environment to benefit the growth of the finance and media sectors. In 1985, the communications satellite company SES was created through a concession by the Luxembourgish state, and received a state guarantee allowing it to finance Astra satellites.

In addition, Luxembourgish authorities supported the audio-visual industry through tax exemptions in 1988. The same year, it adapted into law a European directive on the regulation of "undertakings for collective investment in transferable securities" (UCITS), providing extra momentum to the investment funds sector.

Once the steel crisis seemed dealt with from the late 1980s, the government concentrated its economic efforts on regional aid, SMEs and research and development. The decline of steel jobs was partly compensated by the creation of 45 businesses from 1989 to 1993. Particular attention was given to the media and audio-visual sector, with the government hoping to position the country favourably with regards to this market with a high growth potential.

The financial centre, which continued to grow and diversify, now made up a growing share of the economy. In 1992, the reintroduction of a withholding tax (Quellensteuer) in Germany led to the establishment of new German banks in Luxembourg. At the same time, public finances grew increasingly dependent on the financial sector. In 1994, banks paid a quarter of all withholding tax on salaries, even though it only employed one tenth of salaried employees. Similarly, taxes paid by collective investment undertakings and holding companies made up a significant part of public revenue. Facing attacks from the foreign press aiming to discredit Luxembourg's banking activities, the government took steps intended to strengthen regulation and supervision of the financial centre. Laws were passed to combat money laundering, restrict banking secrecy, impose know your customer requirements on lending institutions, and combat tax fraud. Additionally, the authorities' powers of surveillance were strengthened; this had the goal of safeguarding the moral reputation of Luxembourg's financial centre internationally.

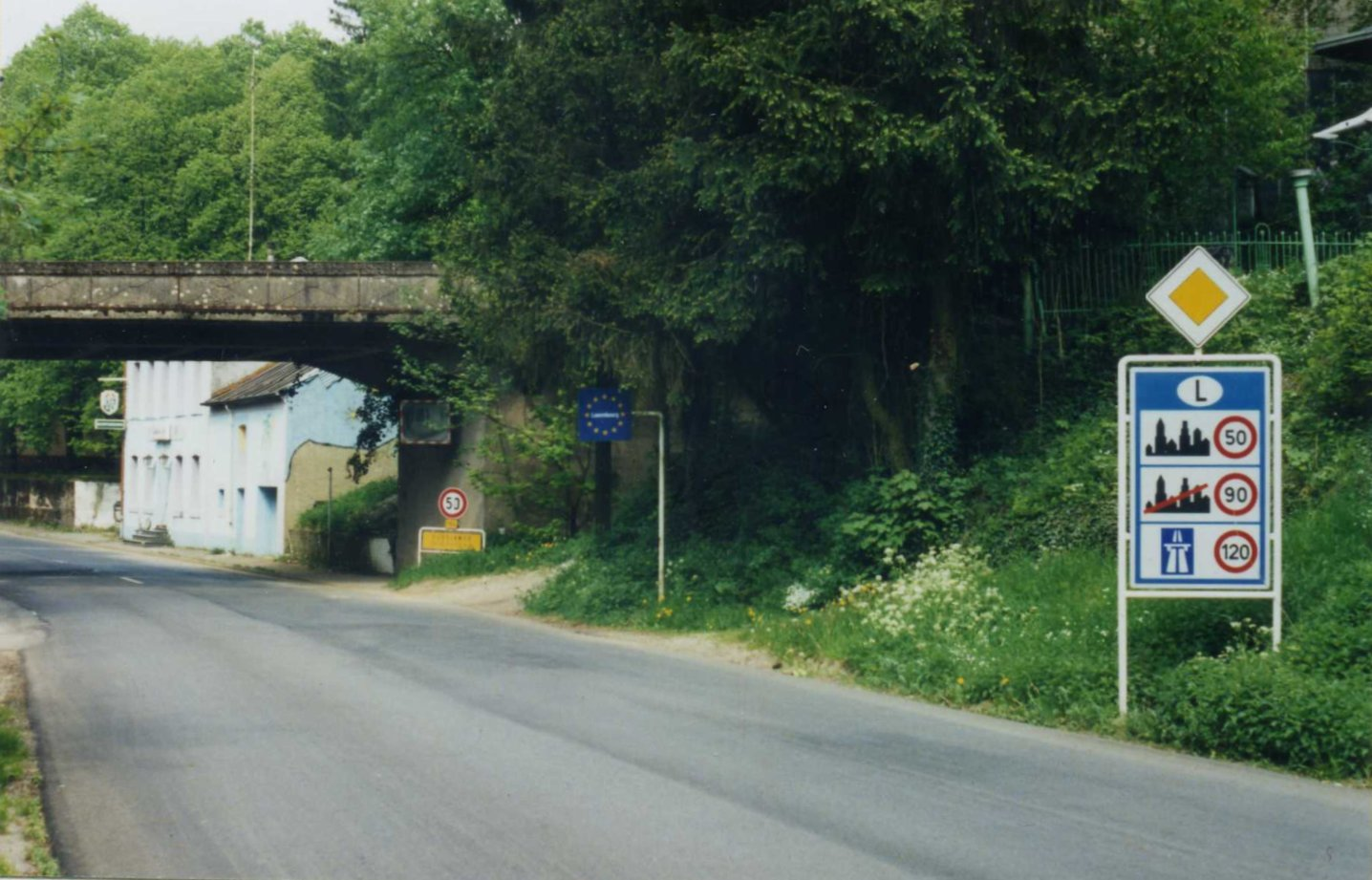
Luxembourg-France border, Dudelange, 1995

==== Cross-border integration ====
The early 1990s were marked by the creation of the European single market (1993) and Luxembourg's integration into the European Community's economic area. There was an increase of cross-border flows, which benefited the Luxembourgish economy and supported growth. For its economic development, Luxembourg was strongly dependent on exchanges with its neighbouring regions. The Greater Region not only provided an increasing proportion of the workforce, but also contributed in a major way to the Grand Duchy's public revenue through direct and indirect taxes paid by cross-border commuters.

==== Infrastructure ====
In the mid-1990s, the government faced a considerable need for public investment, especially with regards to road transport, the health sector, waste management and water treatment. Aside from infrastructure, the focus points of government action were education reform, environmental protection, the modernisation of public administration, family policy, and social solidarity.

==== 1989 and 1994 elections ====
The June 1989 election confirmed the ruling coalition in power, although both the CSV and LSAP lost seats. The government had a solid coalition faced with a divided opposition. There were 7 parties represented in the Chamber, which now included the ADR and two ecological parties.

The 1994 election saw little change in power dynamics, with minor losses for the governing coalition. The CSV-LSAP partnership continued for another parliamentary term.

=== European politics ===
Describing Luxembourgish national politics in this period separately from European politics is difficult, as both were closely interlinked, personally and thematically.

- After Gaston Thorn and Jacques Santer, Juncker was the third former Luxembourgish prime minister to become head of the European Commission, making Luxembourg the only country so far to provide three Commission presidents.
- There was a highly visible degree of personal involvement by Luxembourgish prime ministers in European affairs. Major reforms in this period became strongly associated with the prime minister, such as the 2005 EU Constitution referendum, where Juncker staked his reputation on the outcome. In addition to his post as prime minister, Juncker also held the roles of finance minister and president of the Eurogroup, granting him even more influence and the nickname "Mr. Euro".
- National elections and EU Parliament elections were generally held on the same day.
- There was a broad political consensus across the spectrum among the major parties over European issues and in favour of integration.
- Luxembourgish society was highly "Europeanised". European policies and institutions had a direct influence on people's everyday lives in Luxembourg during this period.
  - The various European bodies headquartered in Luxembourg were a major source of employment, and also caused an influx of foreign workers.
  - The economic transformation since the 1980s, moving from a steel-based economy to one focused on services and the financial sector, would have been impossible without the deepening European integration
  - The many daily cross-border commuters that supported a large part of Luxembourg's economy depended on the freedom of movement provided by the Schengen Treaty

The history of Luxembourg's international relations from 1984 to the present is mostly its engagement with European integration. As its ambassador to France stated in 2006: "Luxembourg concentrates most of its diplomatic efforts on the European Union sphere."

=== Juncker tenure ===
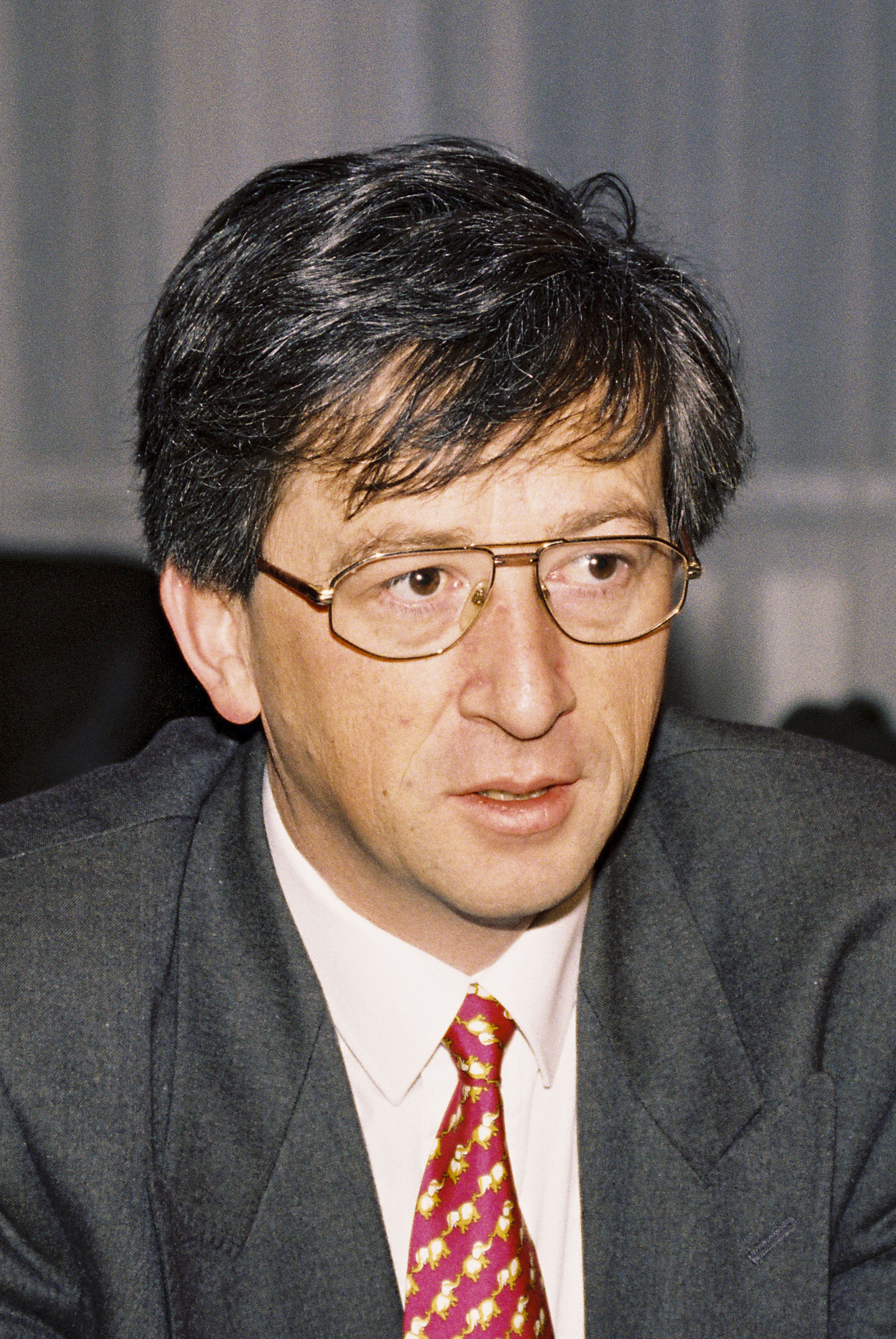
Jean-Claude Juncker succeeded Jacques Santer as prime minister in 1995.

Jean-Claude Juncker was appointed prime minister in 1995 to replace Santer, who assumed the presidency of the European Commission.

After becoming CSV party leader, Juncker attempted to reform the party and shed its image as the political wing of the Catholic Church. The party decided to keep ‘Christian’ in its name, but its 2002 manifesto described its Christian orientation rather vaguely, referring to a world view of Christian humanism, and its dedication to ‘Christian values ensuring peace in Europe’ by ‘forgiving, tolerance, respect and solidarity’. In its last sentence, God was described as the ‘unfathomable prime cause of Being’. By the time of the 2016 revised version, the party merely drew on Christian social doctrine, defined by ‘solidarity, subsidiarity, personality, social justice and the common good’. With regards to social policy, Juncker admitted preferring a coalition with socialists rather than liberals, and was described by Daniel Cohn-Bendit as "the most social-democratic of all Christian Democrats."

==== Juncker-Poos: CSV-LSAP coalition ====
===== Infrastructure expansion =====
During the period 1995–1999, Luxembourg saw strong economic growth, reaching 5,7% in 1998, with inflation at a record low of 1%. This was the effect of the stability policy linked to entry to the European economic and monetary union. From 1995 to 1998, 29,700 new jobs were created, although the unemployment rate stayed relatively high at 3%. If these trends continued, Grand Duchy was projected to count 400,000 jobs and 700,000 inhabitants by 2025. The political authorities used this to argue for an ambitious policy of infrastructure investment. Between 1994 and 1998, the Luxembourgish state invested 74 billion francs in the economy.

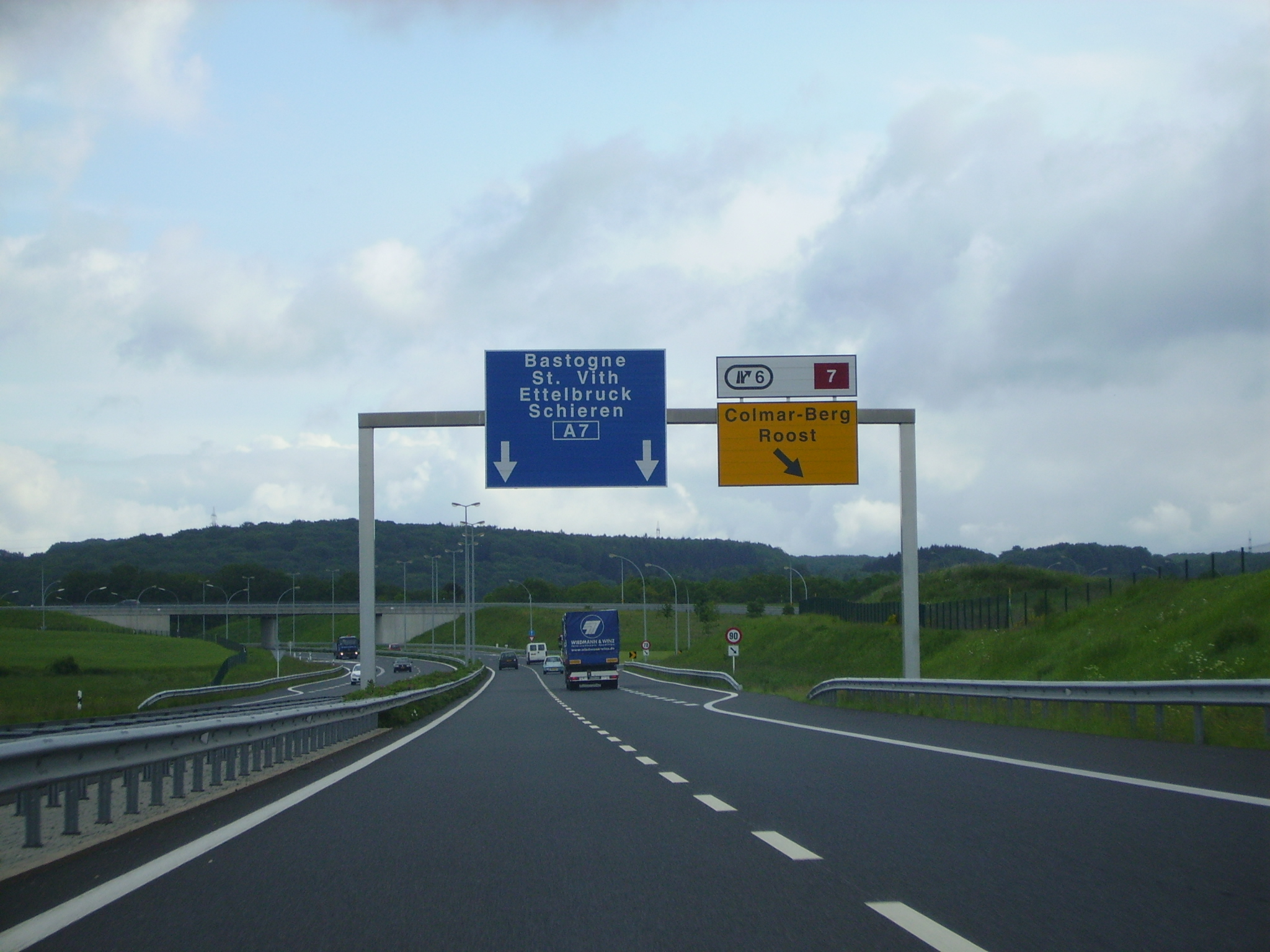
Motorway of the North (A7) between Luxembourg and Ettelbrück

Transport infrastructure was a central feature of this investment: the South collector road linked the cities of the mining basin; the urban motorway of the south facilitated access to the capital; the Motorway of the North would open up the Oesling; the motorway of the Saar would complete the road circle of the Greater Region. To ease the burden on the road network, the government prepared a traffic plan which integrated buses, trams and railways, the BTB (Bus-Tram-Bunn). Similarly, the TGV Est was of great importance to maintain the country's attractiveness as a business location. Luxembourg also participated in the cost of the construction of the Paris-Luxembourg railway line to the tune of 4,6 billion francs.

Additionally, the continued development of the Kirchberg plateau represented a large burden on the State's budget. The government aimed to turn the zone, initially dedicated to European institutions, into a quarter of Luxembourg City in its own right, with residential, commercial and leisure areas.

Developing the audio-visual and media sectors remained a priority. The government continued to support the expansion of SES, which could be considered the jewel of the policy of diversification pursued since the steel crisis. In 1997, the SES operated 11 satellites and Astra channels were received by 70 million viewers. With 2,7 billion francs paid in taxes and licence fees, the SES was the principal contributor towards the Luxembourgish State's finances.

===== Continued Luxembourgish model =====
In the social sphere, the government continued to develop the idea of the Luxembourgish model. One of its major concerns was to avoid the unemployment situation getting worse. The Tripartite on employment met twice during the legislative period. During the tripartite meeting, the social partners agreed on a policy of wage restraint. It was agreed that pay increases would respect the development of productivity. When it came to pensions, government policy aimed to guarantee the system of the legal pension, its level and its possibilities. The government especially tried to narrow the gap between the retirement and pensions systems of the public and private sectors.

===== Investment in culture =====
The I. M. Pei-designed MUDAM opened in 2006, in conjunction with the renovation of Fort Thüngen.

In 1995, Luxembourg City was the European Capital of Culture. This positioned the city on the international cultural scene and gave a new impulse to national cultural policy. The government launched a vast programme of construction of museums and cultural institutions, especially the Musée d'art moderne Grand-Duc Jean and the Museum of the Fortress in the ruins of Fort Thüngen, a philharmonic hall on the Place de l’Europe, a Centre Culturel de Rencontre in the buildings of the old Neimënster Abbey. Apart from these projects, the Casino – Forum d’art contemporain pursued its policy of raising awareness of art, started during the cultural year 1995. The "Centre national de littérature" was inaugurated in 1995.

===== 1999 election =====
At the election of June 1999, both coalition parties suffered significant losses. The CSV-LSAP coalition had at this point been in power for 15 years. The CSV went from 21 seats to 19 seats, the LSAP from 17 to 13 seats. the Democratic Party achieved 15 seats, a gain of 3.

The 1999 election confirmed the growth of small parties at the expense of the three largest parties (CSV, DP and LSAP). The Aktiounskomitee fir Demokratie a Rentegerechtegkeet (ADR) received 7 seats (its best result to date), the Greens (Déi Gréng) received 5, and the newly founded The Left (Déi Lénk) received one.

==== Juncker-Polfer: CSV-DP coalition ====
Coalition negotiations began between the CSV and the DP. In August 1999 the new CSV-DP government was sworn in, with Juncker as prime minister and the DP's Lydie Polfer - who had been the Mayor of Luxembourg City for 17 years at the time - as deputy prime minister and foreign minister.

===== Economic slowdown =====
While the Luxembourgish economy showed very high growth in 1999 and 2000, the economic situation changed sharply in 2001. GDP growth fell by 5 percentage points to less than 2,5%. At the same time, unemployment rose from under 3% to 4,3% by 2003. The economic downturn brought a decrease of tax receipts, which the government could however compensate by using budget reserves. The fiscal reforms of 2001 and 2002 concerning individuals and businesses turned out to be useful, as they contributed to maintaining domestic demand at a relatively stable level, despite economic disturbances.

===== Public investments =====
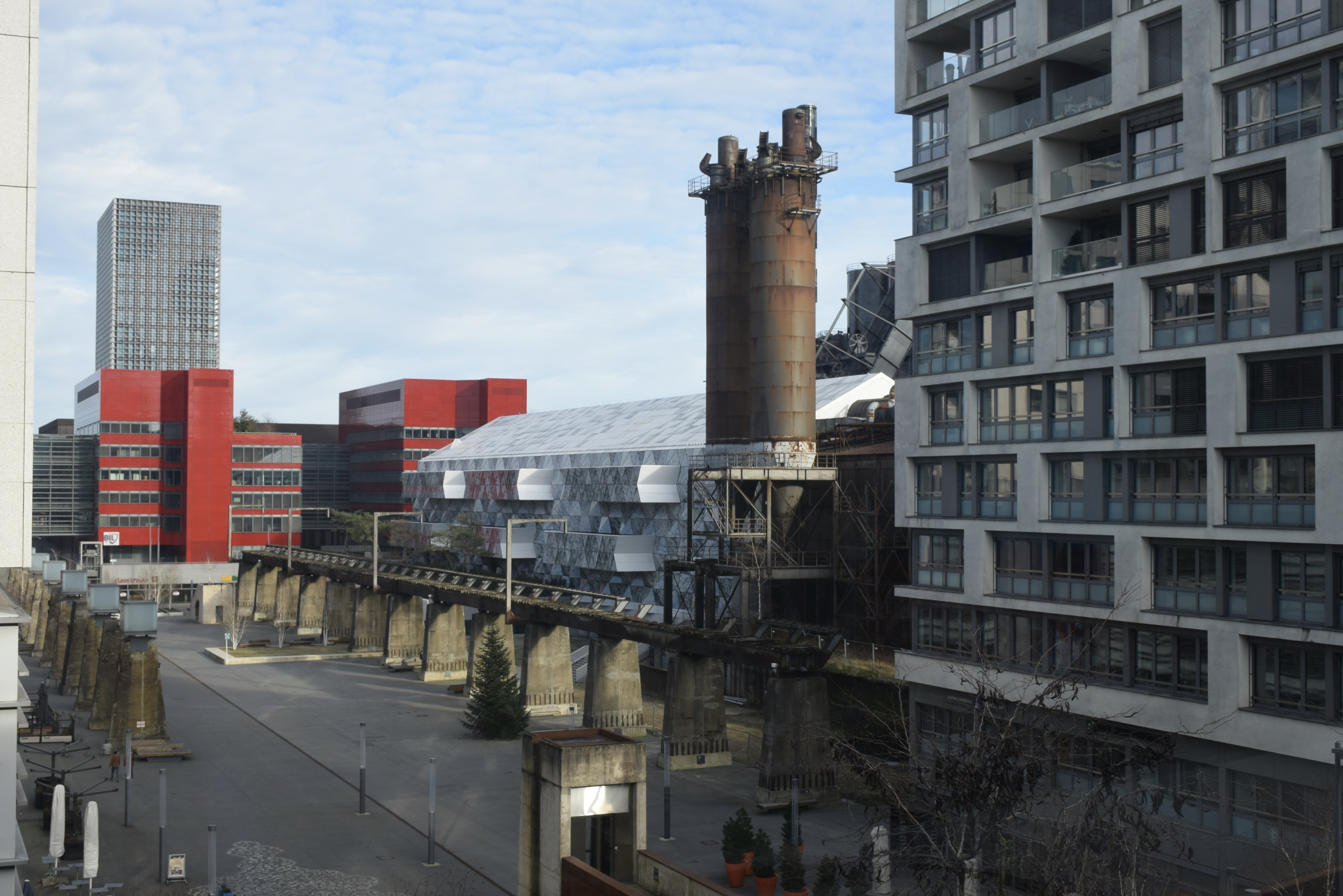
The brownfield district of Belval in Esch-sur-Alzette, developed from the 2000s onwards

Despite the feeble economy, the government maintained significant public investments.

With European enlargement, the Luxembourgish state invested heavily in extending the EU's infrastructure and services based in Luxembourg. The government was also concerned with consolidating the country as a European seat, leading to extensive building work in Kirchberg from 2001.

The redevelopment of disused ARBED steelworks in the Belval district of Esch-sur-Alzette constituted this government's second large construction project. This development project aimed to improve the Southern region, and was in line with the government's decentralising policy. A state-owned company was charged with realising the government's plans on the Belval-Ouest site and to preserve the blast furnaces as industrial heritage. The new district would host the Rockhal music venue and a "City of science, research and innovation".

In healthcare, the government made efforts to stem the explosion of costs. A hospital plan provided for the reorganisation of healthcare, by putting more emphasis on outpatient treatment, and rationalising and modernising existing infrastructure.

===== Sustainable development =====
The government made sustainable development a policy priority. To implement the Kyoto Protocol, Luxembourg had committed to reducing its greenhouse gas emissions by 28% by 2012. It also implemented a strategy to promote public transport and housing with low energy consumption, rational use of energy, and use of renewable energy. The restructuring of the steel industry had already reduced emissions significantly. However, high petrol use, caused by the low taxation of fuel which attracted large numbers of cross-border customers, made it difficult to comply with the Kyoto commitments.

In 2002, the transport minister presented the programme mobiliteit.lu, whose goal was to persuade one quarter of travellers in Luxembourg to use public transport. For this, the connection of Luxembourg to the trans-European railway network and a new line connecting the central railway station to the Kirchberg quarter, via the airport, were considered essential investments.

The government proposed an integrated plan for transport and spatial development. This highlighted certain imbalances and initiated a public debate on how to avoid a decline in quality of life, while pursuing economic growth. While high housing prices had led to an urban exodus, the greater Luxembourg city area still contained two-thirds of all jobs. Luxembourg had become a country of long journeys, mostly by car. The integrated plan sought to bring places of work, housing and leisure closer together. It proposed a development model based on three urban areas, separated by green belts: the Southern region, the capital, and the "Nordstad". Each centre would possess the necessary economic, social and cultural infrastructure to function independently.

===== Education and culture =====
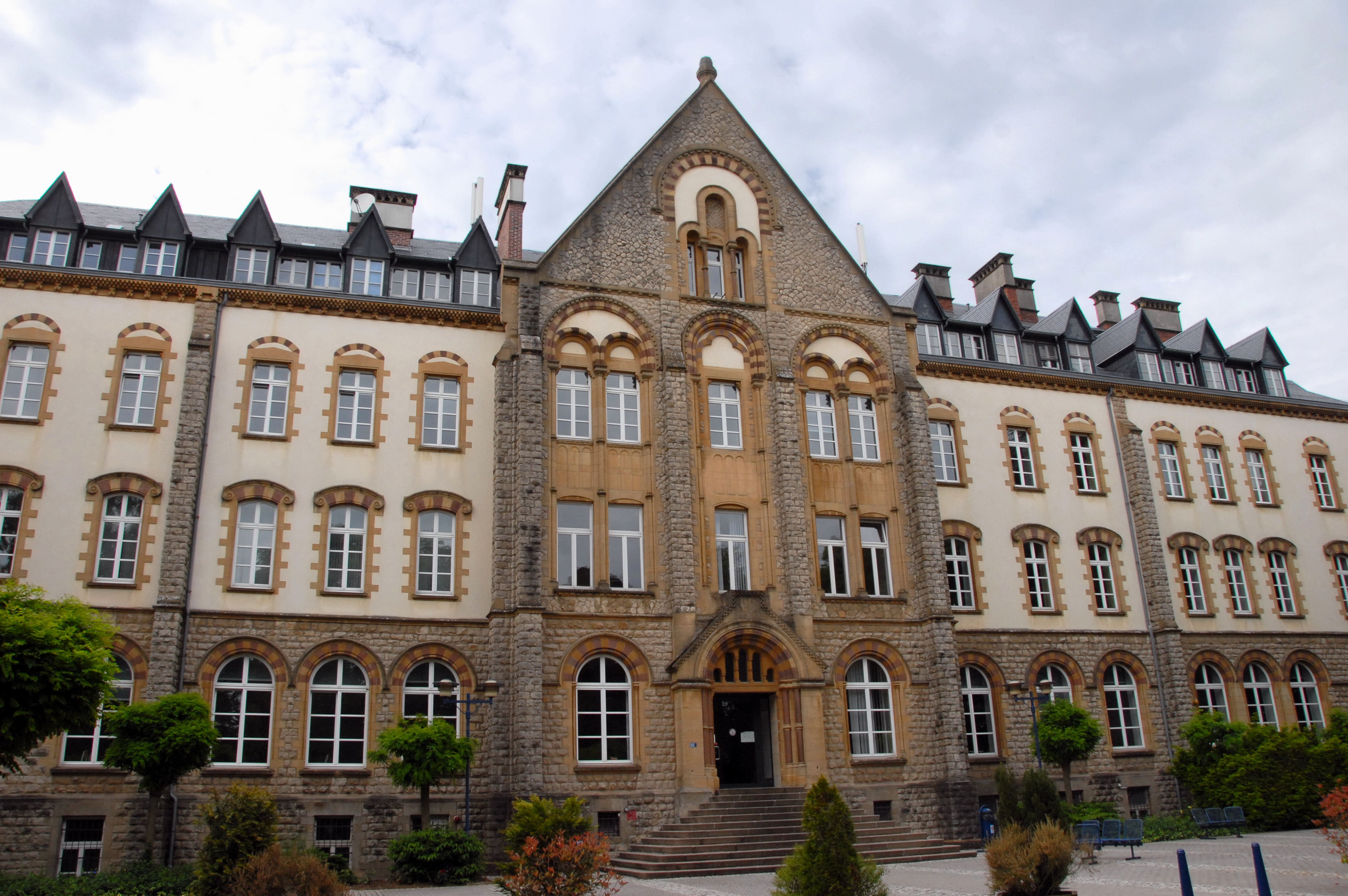
The University of Luxembourg was founded in 2003 and initially headquartered in Limpertsberg.

The EU's Lisbon Strategy of 2000 called for the formation of a "Europe of innovation and knowledge". To this end, the Luxembourgish government focused on supporting research and technological development. In 2000, the "Fonds national de la recherche" (National Research Fund) started its work. The government also changed its higher education policy, setting up the University of Luxembourg. In the area of secondary education, the government undertook some critical examination. The Programme for International Student Assessment (PISA), which evaluated students' performances, put Luxembourg in a disappointing 30th place out of 32 countries. The priority in future was to be a "back to basics" approach which valued quality over quantity.

Similarly, in the context of the knowledge society, culture remained a fundamental concern. In 2003, the Luxembourgish government proposed to extend the scope of Luxembourg, the European Capital of Culture 2007, to the Greater Region, which was accepted by the jury.

===== 2004 election =====
At the time of the 2004 election, the outgoing government could claim to have defended the country's main economic interest on the international stage, its financial centre (mostly through banking secrecy laws). Juncker also called for the granting of double nationality, under certain conditions, to residents working in Luxembourg, that could counterbalance the 2001 nationality law changes. He therefore managed to cover a large scope of opinions, ranging from the struggle for national interests to a liberal view on nationality, together with a general pro-European commitment.

The CSV's election campaign placed Juncker at its centre. The question of his potential appointment as President of the European Commission also pervaded the campaign, as a successor would have to be sought within his party should Juncker leave national politics.

Although this did not happen, Juncker's electoral success brought his party to a level never reached at the European Parliament elections (over 37%), allowing it to regain its third seat, to the detriment of the LSAP. The latter lost for the fourth time in a row at the European elections but managed to return to power thanks to its slightly better result at the national elections. This change of coalition Government was facilitated by the heavy defeat of the junior partner of the CSV, the DP which also lost votes to the Greens at the election to the EP.

==== Juncker-Asselborn: CSV-LSAP coalition ====
===== 2005 European Constitution referendum =====
As promised in the 2004 coalition agreement, a referendum was held in July 2005 on the Treaty establishing a Constitution for Europe. The backdrop to this was that France and the Netherlands had held their own referendums in the previous two months, resulting in "No" votes in both cases. In Luxembourg, the popular Prime Minister Juncker became personally involved, staking his reputation on the result by declaring that he would resign from his position in case of a "No" victory.

The referendum result highlighted the difference of opinion between the political élites and citizens on the issue of EU integration. Although the political establishment was overwhelmingly in favour of the treaty, only 56.5% of the population voted ‘yes’. The disconnect between citizens and their representatives was obvious, as the proportion of deputies belonging to parties that campaigned for "no" in 2005 was only 8.3%, in comparison to the 43.5% of ‘no’ votes in the referendum.

Unlike in France and in the Netherlands, the key element determining the ‘no’ vote was not the voters’ opinion about the socio-economic situation of the country (which here came second) but rather voters’ opinion on the European Constitutional Treaty itself.

- Despite Luxembourg having the highest rate of GDP per head in the EU and a low level of unemployment—slightly above 4%—the economic situation was perceived by almost one-third of Luxembourgers as worrying; the rate of unemployment had doubled in the preceding four years.
- Concerns about the delocalization of large companies, fears of employment losses in the powerful banking sector and civil service sector in the event of tax harmonization, and decisions taken at the European level regarding the opening of all public sector jobs to non-nationals, combined to make Luxembourgers the most pessimistic Europeans about the evolution of unemployment.
- Luxembourg's population also became more concerned about the influx of refugees (that had begun in the 1990s with the Balkan crisis) and illegal immigration.

During the referendum campaign, the ‘no’ side gained momentum, fuelled by the Dutch and French ‘no’ results, but ultimately did not win. It is possible that without Juncker's personal involvement, the result would have been different.

===== 2009 election =====
The CSV emerged as the winner of the June 2009 election, increasing its vote share by 3 percentage points and winning 26 seats, an increase of two. Its coalition partner the LSAP lost one seat but remained the second-largest political party by seats. The Democratic Party continued its downward trend in seat numbers from 15 (1999) to 10 (2004) to 9 (2009). The CSV-LSAP coalition continued for another term.

===== Asylum and prisons =====
From the early 2000s onwards, there was a sharp rise in the number of asylum seekers. The procedure was long and cumbersome and failed asylum seekers awaiting deportation were kept in the country's main prison at Schrassig, as no separate accommodation was available. This prison was also in the news for incidents such as escapes, violence and allegations of sexual abuse in a facility that did not even separate juvenile offenders from adult prisoners. Despite the adoption of more stringent policies, resulting in a considerable decrease in the number of asylum applications, following the abolition of visas for Serbian citizens by signatories of the EU's Schengen Agreement at the beginning of 2011, the number of asylum applications (mainly Roma) rose again dramatically causing a temporary closure of the refugee offices. Meanwhile, both voluntary and involuntary repatriations continued to increase, with some of the latter proving highly controversial, provoking considerable publicity and public protests.

===== Coalition tensions over reforms =====
Problems arose in some of the reforms undertaken by the government. Until now, the additional family allowance had been paid to families with full-time students over the age of 18. Controversially, their proposed replacement, the new grants and loans for students would not be paid to non-resident workers, leading to widespread trade union protests on behalf of thousands of cross-border commuters. The Court of Justice rejected the new policy as discriminatory in 2013, leading to a revision of the law.

The government proposed a controversial reform of the marriage and adoption law in 2010, allowing same-sex marriage and conferring the same rights and duties as heterosexual marriage. The law recognised homosexual couples' right to adoption, and members of a married same-sex couple could adopt a child individually but not together. The Council of State rejected this, and the parliamentary committee reconsidered the liberal Belgian and French models making no difference between married couples regarding adoption. No full compromise was reached by the time the Juncker government fell in 2013.

In 2012, following months of protests against proposed education reforms, the Government was obliged to extend the negotiation phase of the plans until 2013. The proposed measures were designed to take account of demographic changes, including the fact that more children were entering the Luxembourg school system who did not speak Luxembourgish at home.

These and other issues exacerbated tensions within the coalition and within each of the political parties. For the CSV concerns centred on ethical reforms such as the adoption issue for same-sex couples, whereas for the LSAP internal tensions focused on the question of the limitation of wage indexation (until 2015), which was intended to rescue the competitiveness of Luxembourg's economy by limiting labour costs, and on the adoption of the various European stability treaties. In addition, in 2012 a preliminary investigation into extortion, that involved two ministers accused of having lobbied an entrepreneur, was launched (the so-called Wickrange/Livange affair, named after the localities where a shopping centre and a football stadium were to be built). The affair was widely reported in the media; however, the Chamber of Deputies eventually decided not to pursue proceedings against the CSV and LSAP ministers cited in the general prosecutor's preliminary investigation.

===== SREL affair =====
Speculation about the Bombers Affair had been on-going since the 1980s. In 2012, the newspaper D’Lëtzebuerger Land revealed the contents of a recording by the director of the state intelligence service, the Service de Renseignements de l’État Luxembourgeois (SREL), of a 2008 conversation with prime minister Jean-Claude Juncker, revealing the existence of thousands of illegal files on Luxembourgish citizens. This led to a parliamentary inquiry. More allegations came to light, such as another alleged recording of a meeting between the prime minister and Grand Duke that supposedly referred to the Bombers Affair, and the possibility that it involved the Grand Duke's brother, Prince Jean. The SREL was heavily scrutinised by the inquiry and the press, scrutiny which brought to the fore accusations of illegal activities and suspicions of corruption. The committee's report in July 2013 was debated in the Chamber, during which not only the opposition but Juncker's junior coalition partner, the LSAP, criticised him and demanded he be held accountable.

===== 2013 election =====
Juncker resigned, and publicly blamed his coalition partner for betrayal. Legislative elections were scheduled for October, the first early elections since the 1960s. Given Juncker's popularity, projections suggested that the CSV might not lose enough seats to allow for an alternative DP-LSAP-Green coalition. However, alternatives such as a renewed CSV-LSAP alliance or a CSV-DP government would also be difficult. In the event, the election results meant the end of the CSV's and Juncker's time in government. At the time of leaving office, he was the longest-serving head of any national government in the EU.

=== Bettel: "Gambia" coalition ===
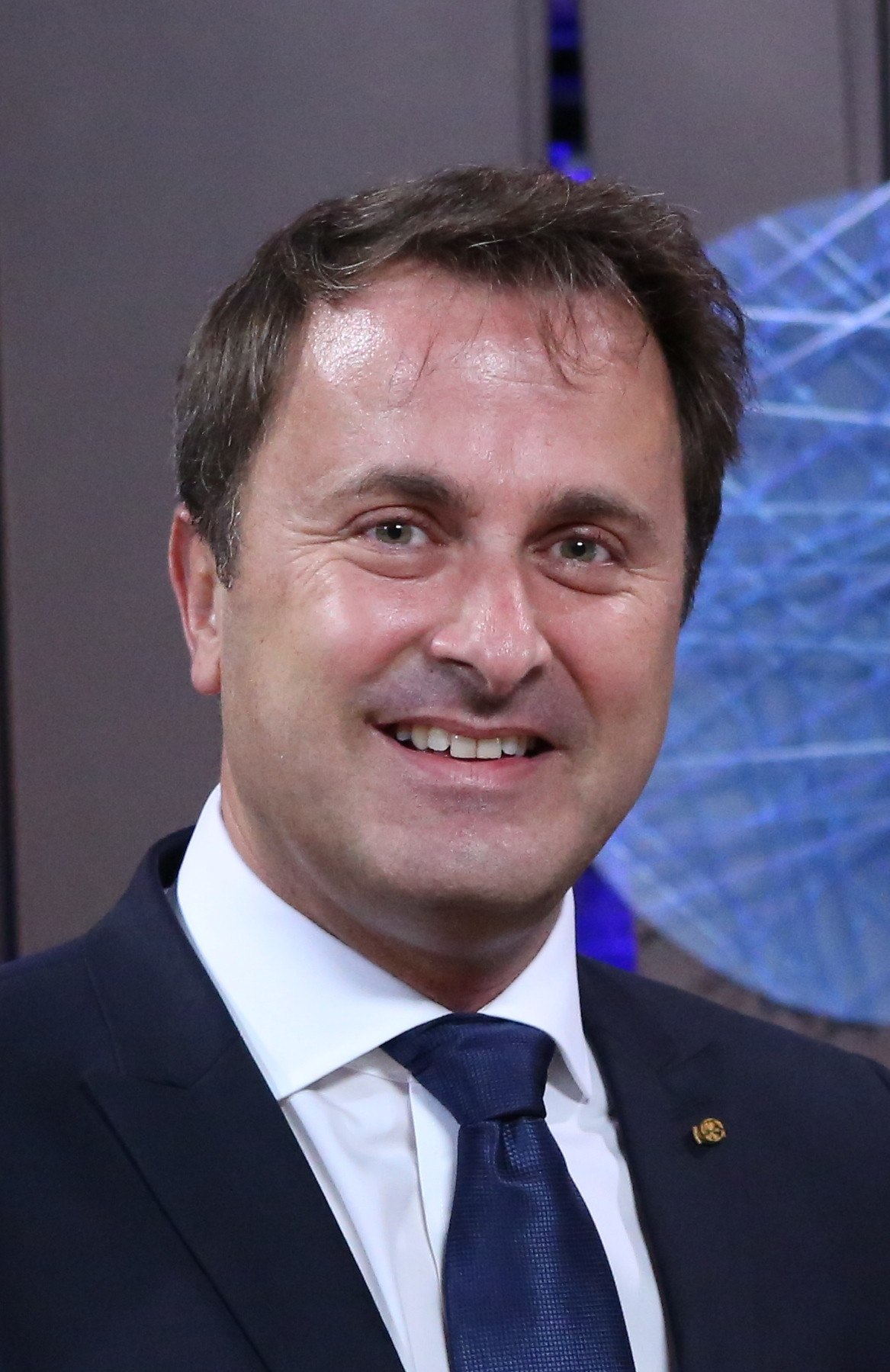
Xavier Bettel was prime minister from 2013 to 2023, as the first liberal to hold the office since Gaston Thorn.

A coalition was formed between the DP, LSAP and Greens after the 2013 election, presided by the DP's Xavier Bettel. This was only the second government since 1945 that did not involve the CSV. It was also the first time the Greens were involved in government. Due to the colours associated with the 3 parties (red, blue and green) the arrangement was known as a "Gambia coalition".

In its two terms of office, the coalition introduced far-reaching social reforms, in order to overcome what they termed the political stagnation in the country which had come about due to long years of CSV dominance. Of particular note are the separation of church and state, the abolition of religion lessons in public schools, and the legal establishment of same-sex marriages.

The second term of office from 2018 was marked by the social and political consequences of various crises including the COVID-19 pandemic, which had a major effect on political life in Luxembourg. This affected the coalition's achievements in its second term: while the government was able to fulfil some of its manifesto promises, such as the introduction of free public transport, many proposals did not or only partly came to fruition. However, in July 2023 a modernised constitution came into force, which was more adapted to the workings of the current political system, and which was passed with the votes not only of the coalition parties but also the CSV.

In 2023, the government legalised the possession and cultivation of cannabis for personal use, against strong criticism from the CSV.

==== Church-state relations ====
The coalition started negotiations with the established religions on relations between state and religion and the public funding of religion. The government threatened to include a question on state-funded salaries and pensions clergy members in the planned 2015 referendum. Negotiations with the Catholic Archbishop of Luxembourg were concluded swiftly and led to a convention being signed in January 2015. As a result, Church properties would be placed in a public fund, and Catholic confessional education in schools was replaced with a non-confessional ethics and morals course, including modules on world religions.

==== 2018 election ====
In the run-up to the October 2018 general elections, it was widely expected that the CSV would win and return to office. This was due to the coalition's poor results in the 2015 referendum, 2017 local elections, and opinion polling. Speculation therefore focused on the CSV's choice of junior coalition partner. Counter to expectations, the CSV lost 5 percentage points of the vote share, achieving their poorest performance since World War II. The coalition parties' aggregate vote share increased, mostly due to the Greens' large increase. Furthermore, the Pirate Party achieved parliamentary representation for the first time, with two Chamber seats. As the incumbent parties maintained their parliamentary majority, the coalition continued for another term. This was seen by observers as a significant shift in the country's party system. It was the first time in recent history that the CSV, the dominant party since World War II, would be out of power for two consecutive terms, (Note: The 1974-1979 Gaston Thorn government, a coalition between LSAP and DP, lasted only one term in power before the CSV returned to government) which harmed the party's narrative that it was the only party to provide stability in government.

==== Covid-19 pandemic ====
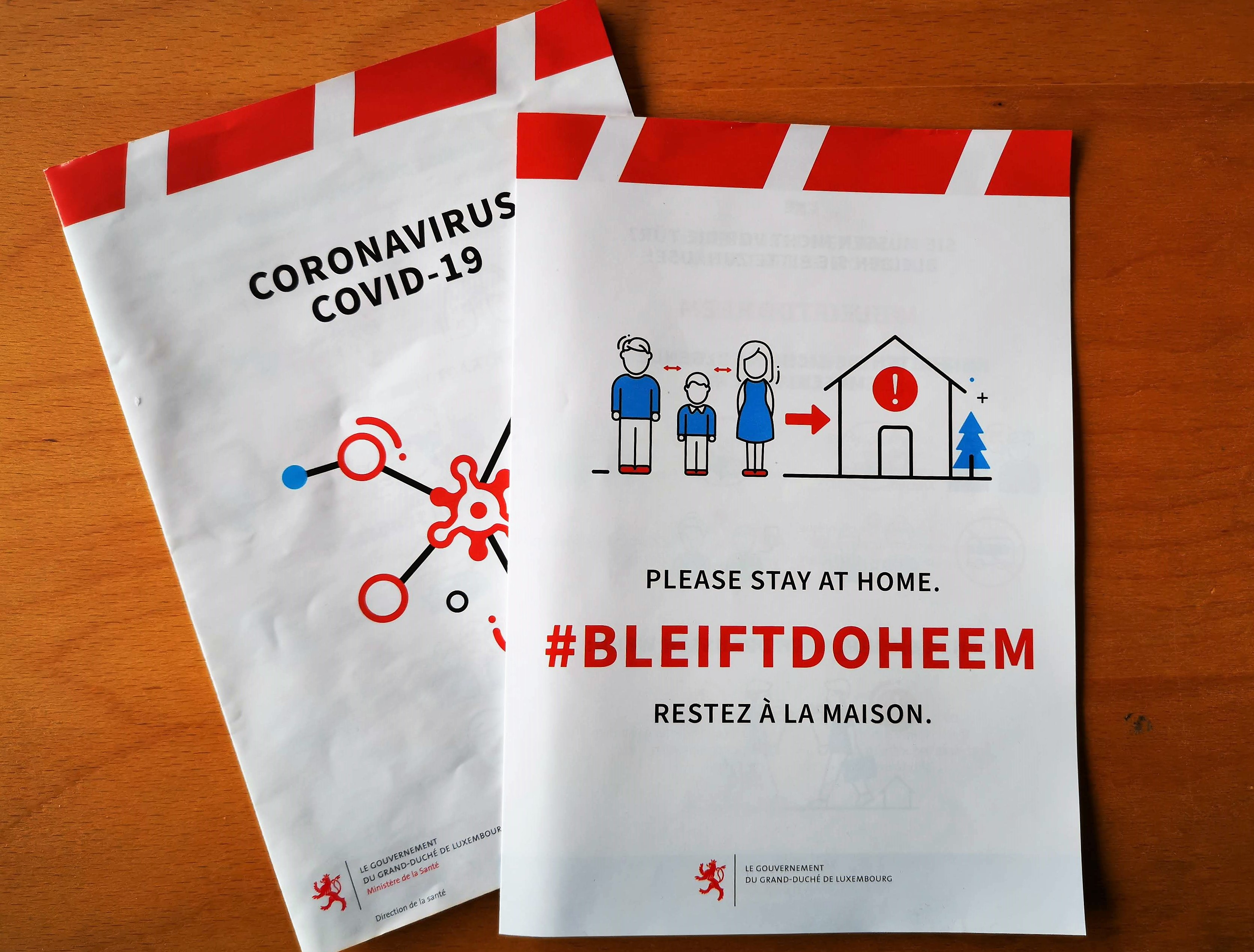
Informational leaflets published by the Luxembourgish government during the Covid-19 pandemic

Luxembourg saw its first coronavirus case in February 2020. In March, prime minister Bettel announced a state of emergency, and the government introduced various unprecedented measures to contain the outbreak, such as closing, restricting movement, closing public spaces such as businesses to the public, stopping visits to hospital patients, forbidding health care workers from taking leave, and mandating employees to work from home if possible. Tensions had already been caused by Luxembourg's neighbouring countries' closure of their borders, highly unusual in the Schengen Area of free movement, leading to great difficulties for cross-border workers, who made up a huge part of Luxembourg's economy.

==== 2023 election ====
2023 was a "super election year" (Superwaljoer), as it saw both local (June) and national elections (October). The communal elections on 11 June seemed to signal a change in the coalition's political fortunes, as the Greens lost votes in many communes. The election campaigns for the national elections were quite reserved, conducted in a temperate manner and without major personal attacks. Housing was a major issue of the campaign: high population growth had led to a tense situation in the housing market. The CSV also managed to make the question of public safety a central issue, mentioning what they believed to be the rising level of crime in the country.

On 8 October, the Gambia coalition lost its already thin majority in the Chamber. This was primarily due to the Greens losing more than half their seats. The DP and LSAP both actually gained seats, but not enough to compensate for the Green losses. Although the CSV gained no seats, winning exactly the same number as in 2018, its leader Luc Frieden was seen as the winner of the election.

=== Frieden-Bettel: CSV-DP coalition ===
Luc Frieden had previously held various posts including that of finance minister before 2013, then left political life, before returning to politics in 2023. He formed a CSV coalition with the DP, with the former prime minister Xavier Bettel as foreign minister and deputy prime minister. Frieden presented his priorities as deregulation, digitalisation, taxes, and housing.

One of the government's first acts was to accept the begging ban put forward by the City of Luxembourg.

== Economy ==
=== Overview ===
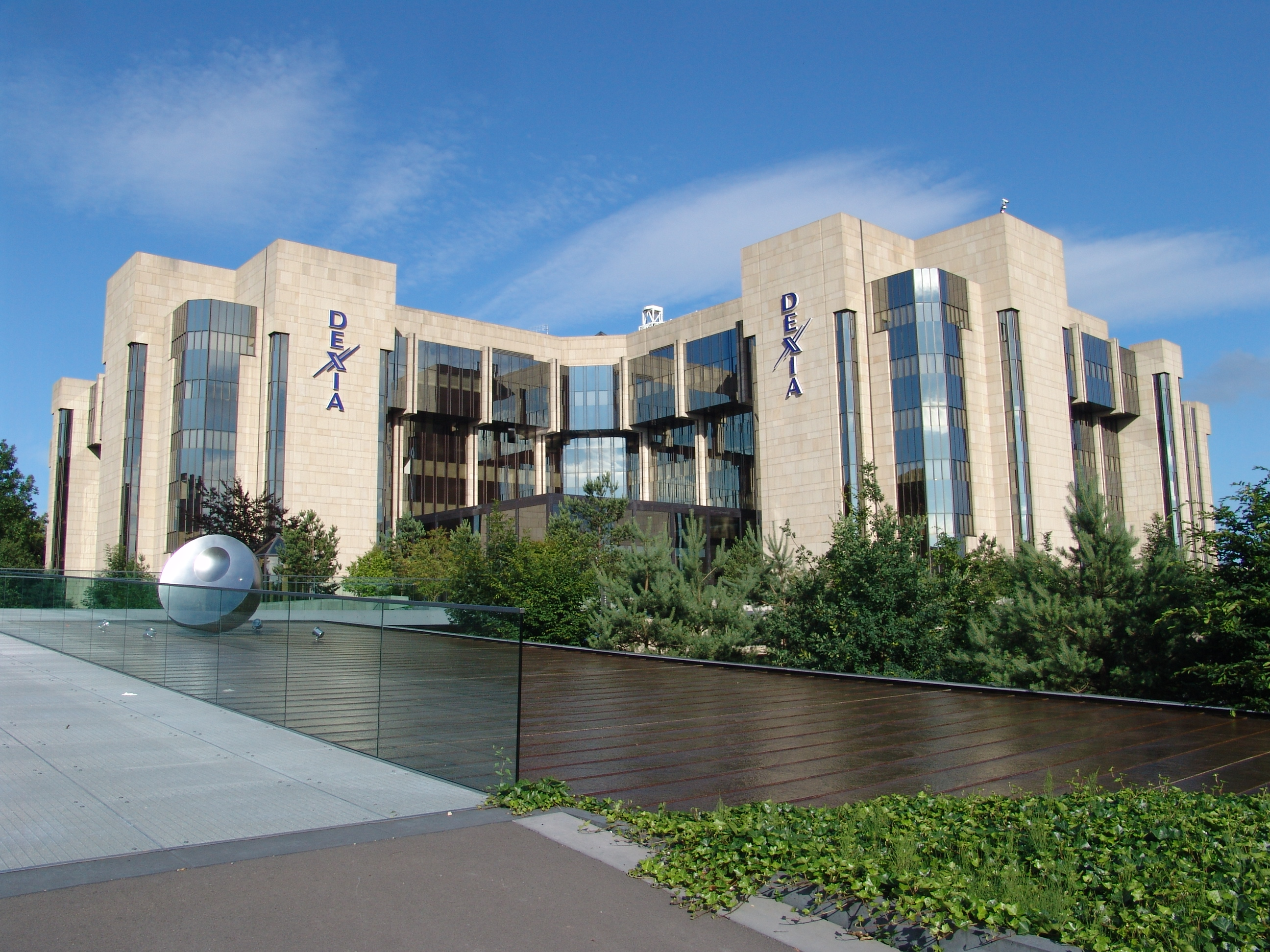
Dexia (headquarters pictured) was one of the banks most strongly impacted by the 2008 financial crisis.

After the Trente Glorieuses ("Thirty Glorious Years"), the prosperous period from 1945 to the mid-1970s, followed by the crisis years of 1975–1985, Luxembourg experienced the Vingt Splendides ("Twenty Splendid Years") from 1985 to 2007, with an average annual growth of 5,3%, more than twice the rate of the EU-15 countries.

After 1989, there were economic slowdowns in the early 1990s and from 2001 to 2003, but the country's annual growth rates never sank below 1,5%, until 2008. For the period 1985–2007 as a whole, Luxembourg's average GDP growth rate was 5,2%, more than twice the rates of the UE-15 or of its neighbours, which stood at around 2%.

The Vingt Splendides in Luxembourg came to an end with the 2008 financial crisis. GDP growth had reached 6,6% in 2007, but turned negative in 2008 with a rate of -0,8%, and indicating a severe recession with -4,1% in 2009. Growth returned in 2010 at 3,0%, declining to 1,7% the following year.

After contracting in 2023 by -1,1%, the economy returned to modest growth in 2024 (+0,5%). More robust growth was expected for 2025 (2,5%) and 2026 (2,6%).

=== Financial sector ===
The financial sector plays a vital role in the Luxembourgish economy, making up more than a fifth of added-value in the economy in 2011. It comprises not only commercial banks, but also the central bank, collective investment undertakings, holding companies, insurance companies, and other forms of companies. The banking sector is at the centre of this financial universe, since other financial actors depend on it to manage their capital flows. In addition, investment funds and holding companies often depend on banks for their day-to-day management, with no staff of their own.

The Luxembourg financial centre had been established due to Eurobonds in the 1970s. However, this phase of its growth was coming to an end.

Euro-bankers nevertheless decided to remain established in Luxembourg. Encouraged by various measures taken by the Luxembourgish political authorities, they decided to expand their base of operations in Luxembourg in turning to other activities. It was no coincidence that their choice fell on private clients as a new market niche. This clientele had not only proved good customers in Switzerland, which served as a model to Luxembourg, but also had potential for considerable growth.

With the end of post-war reconstruction, durable economic growth manifested itself in the countries of Western Europe, leading to a material prosperity which simultaneously stimulated consumption and savings in this part of the world. The banking industry found itself faced with a new type of client, whose capacity to save and therefore to invest continued to grow. While, individually, they may have been of modest means, this new type of clients soon gained in importance due to the multiplication effect of large numbers.

=== Steel ===
The Esch-Schifflange steelworks, which closed in 2013, pictured during demolition in 2025

In 1985, the steel industry in Luxembourg occupied 13,400 people. By 2010, this had plunged to 6,000. In 1990, steel made up 11% of GDP, shrinking to 2% by 2011. In 1990, steelworkers made up 6% of Luxembourg's total workforce, but only 2% by 2010.

In 1993, the decision was taken to base steel production on the electric procedure, which meant the end of the LDAC procedure. The first electric steelworks started production in Esch-Schifflange in 1994. The last blast furnace in Luxembourg shut its doors on 28 August 1997, putting an end to cast iron production and imports of iron ore, replaced entirely by electric steelworks, using scrap iron as their raw material.

However, the modernisation and rationalisation reforms failed to maintain Luxembourgish steel's competitivity on the global market. The country's steel industry had never truly recovered from the effects of the economic crisis of 1975–1985, linked to the oil crises. Thus, faced with overcapacity and suffering from the poor quality of local iron ore, the industry had to restructure and reduce its production capacity and staffing levels.

Initially, there were only three modern electric steelworks, those of Esch-Schifflange, Differdange and Esch-Belval, until the works of Schifflange closed their doors in 2013.

Since the first steel crisis, Luxembourgish steel production had not evolved in sync with international production. While the latter grew by an average of 2% during 1974–2010, Luxembourgish steel production decreased by 2,6% per year in the same period. In this period, the Western world's share of world steel production declined in importance, while the BRIC countries showed a startling growth.

Since the crisis years of 1975–1985, Luxembourgish steel had to adapt to changing conditions. In the end, this resulted in the merger of the companies Aceralia (Spanish), ARBED and Usinor (French) into Arcelor on 18 February 2002, headquartered in Luxembourg. After this merger, this company was the foremost worldwide steel producers for three years, before being overtaken by Mittal Steel Company in 2005. In January 2006, Mittal launched a hostile takeover of 18,6 billion Euros, which was rejected by Arcelor. To counter the takeover, Arcelor announced a merger with the Russian company Severstal. However, in June 2006, the European Commission approved Arcelor's purchase by Mittal Steel Company. After some judicial disputes, Mittal Steel Company's hostile takeover was transformed into a friendly takeover and the offer of 25,4 billion Euros was accepted by Arcelor in June 2006. The new group called ArcelorMittal became by far the biggest world steel producer, with its headquarters remaining in Luxembourg. It produced 97 million tonnes of raw steel in 2011, or 6,5% of world steel production.

=== Energy ===
In the late 1990s, the government launched a project of diversification to exploit renewable energy and support the development of wind farms, biogas cogeneration centres, and solar farms.

From the mid-1980s onwards, petrol products made up the majority of the country's energy consumption, replacing lignite and coke. Natural gas first made an appearance in Luxembourg in 1970. It saw great success, soon replacing coal gas.

=== E-commerce ===
In 2005, AOL established its European headquarters in Luxembourg; in 2011, Netflix did the same.

== Society ==
=== Poverty and inequality ===
Inequality increased during this period. In 2005, the at-risk-of-poverty rate stood at 13%. There were discrepancies at work here: while only 6% of Luxembourgers were at risk of poverty, 22% of foreigners living in the country were at risk. By 2019, the at-risk-of-poverty rate had increased to 17,5% as a whole, and was now above the European average (16,5%). For single-parent families, the rate was over 40%. 11% of Luxembourgers were at risk of poverty, and 22% of non-Luxembourgers. While the rate for foreigners remained constant, there was a significant increase for Luxembourgers. The rate of the "working poor" — those in work and at risk of poverty — increased from 7% (2003) to 12% (2019), the second-highest rate in the Eurozone.

The top rate of income tax was steadily lowered in the first half of this period, from 56% (1987), to 50% (1991), to 38% (2002). It was then mildly increased after the 2007 financial crisis, to 39% in 2011, 40% in 2013, and finally 42% 2017.

=== Housing ===
This period saw three sub-periods, which each saw rapid house price rises: 1985–1992, 2000-2007 and 2010–2022.

=== Population ===
From 1975 to 2025, Luxembourg's population increased from 360,000 to 680,000, a growth rate of 89%, with the vast majority of this increase taking place since the mid-1990s. This dynamic population growth was linked to the country's economic boom connected to the development of the financial sector and the services sector since the mid-1980s. This growth was especially due to migration. From 1981 to 2011, the total population increased from 365,000 to 512,000. While the number of Luxembourgers remained almost static (changing from 269,000 to 292,000), the number of foreigners went from 96,000 to 221,000, and their part of the population from 26% to 43%.

== See also ==
- History of Luxembourg
- International relations since 1989

== Bibliography and further reading ==
=== Politics and international relations ===
- Besch, Nadine; Lessing, Guido (2016). "Europhile by nature: the case of the small Grand Duchy of Luxembourg". In Bukovskis, Karlis (ed.). Euroscepticism in Small EU Member States. Latvian Institute of International Affairs. ISBN 978-9984-583-81-5.
- Carls, Paul (2023). "Approaching right-wing populism in the context of transnational economic integration: lessons from Luxembourg". European Politics and Society. 24 (2): 265–283. doi:10.1080/23745118.2021.1993056.
- Dumont, Patrick; Poirier, Philippe (18 June 2004). "La double loi d'airain d'un système politique". d'Lëtzebuerger Land (in French). Vol. 51, no. 25. pp. 16–17.
- Dumont, Patrick; Kies, Raphaël (2013). "Political History of Luxembourg". Europa World Year Book. Routledge. pp. 4–8.
- Dumont, Patrick; Kies, Raphaël; Schmit, Dan (2022). "Party Politics in Luxembourg: Stable, Consensual and Pragmatic". In Bertoa, Fernando Casal; Dumont, Patrick (eds.). Party Politics in European Microstates. Routledge. pp. 121–145. doi:10.4324/9781315206776-8.
- Cronqvist, Lasse (2024). "Die Parlamentswahlen und Koalitionsverhandlungen in Luxemburg am 8. Oktober 2023". In Drewes, Oliver; Minas, Marius (eds.). Politikwissenschaftlicher Jahresrückblick 2023 des Trierer Institut für Demokratie- und Parteienforschung (PDF) (in German). Trierer Institut für Demokratie- und Parteienforschung. pp. 44–46.
- Harmsen, Robert; Högenauer, Anna-Lena (February 2020). "Luxembourg and the European Union" (PDF). Oxford Research Encyclopedia of Politics. doi:10.1093/acrefore/9780190228637.013.1041. ISBN 978-0-19-022863-7.
- de Jonge, Léonie; Kmec, Sonja (2019). "Luxembourg: History" (PDF). In Europa Publications (ed.). Western Europe (22nd ed.).
- Kies, Raphaël; Dumont, Patrick; Schmit, Dan (2019). "Luxembourg: Political developments and data in 2018" (PDF). European Journal of Political Research Political Data Yearbook. 58: 184–193. doi:10.1111/2047-8852.12244.
- Messner, Francis (2016). "La réforme des cultes au Grand-duché du Luxembourg en 2015". Revue du droit des religions (in French) (1): 161–166. doi:10.4000/rdr.1081.
- Santer, Jacques (November 1986). "Luxembourg and the Future of The Atlantic Alliance". Harvard International Review. 9 (1): 19, 47 – via JSTOR.
- Thewes, Guy (2011). Les gouvernements du Grand-Duché de Luxembourg depuis 1848 (PDF) (in French). Luxembourg: Le Gouvernement du Grand-Duché de Luxembourg - Service information et presse. ISBN 978-2-87999-212-9.
- Wurth, Hubert (2006). "La politique étrangère du Luxembourg". Revue internationale et stratégique (in French) (1): 217–226. doi:10.3917/ris.061.0217.

=== Economy ===
- Casali, Simone (12 March 2013). L'industrie sidérurgique luxembourgeoise depuis les années 60 (PDF). Le Luxembourg 1960-2010 (in French). STATEC - Institut national de la statistique et des études économiques.
- Danescu, Elena (2020). "Luxembourg Economy Facing Challenges: A Historical Overview" (PDF). In Hartley, Cathy (ed.). Western Europe 2021.
- Danescu, Elena (2021). "Luxembourg Economy: In the Aftermath of the Pandemic" (PDF). In Hartley, Cathy (ed.). Western Europe 2022.
- Gargano, Lucia (19 December 2012). L'essor du secteur tertiaire au Luxembourg (PDF). Le Luxembourg 1960-2010 (in French). STATEC - Institut national de la statistique et des études économiques.
- Govaert, Serge (30 April 1998). "Le Grand-Duché de Luxembourg: une stabilité trompeuse?". d'Letzeburger Land (in French). Vol. 45, no. 18. pp. 12–13.
- Michaux, Robert (15 April 2013). Le secteur bancaire au Luxembourg (PDF). Le Luxembourg 1960-2010 (in French). STATEC - Institut national de la statistique et des études économiques.
- Osier, Guillaume (3 July 2012). L'évolution du revenu des ménages depuis le milieu des années 80 (PDF). Le Luxembourg 1960-2010 (in French). STATEC - Institut national de la statistique et des études économiques.
- Raggi, Pascal (2017). "La désindustrialisation et les entreprises minières et sidérurgiques au Grand-Duché de Luxembourg et en Lorraine du fer (années 1960-2006)". In Daumas, Jean-Claude; Kharaba, Ivan; Mioche, Philippe (eds.). La désindustrialisation: une fatalité?. Les Cahiers de la MSHE Ledoux (in French). Besançon: Presses universitaires de Franche-Comté. pp. 103–121. doi:10.4000/books.pufc.20934. ISBN 978-2-84867-796-5.
- Reichmann, Liliane (6 November 2012). Le comportement touristique depuis le milieu des années 80 (PDF). Le Luxembourg 1960-2010 (in French). STATEC - Institut national de la statistique et des études économiques.
- Thunus, Olivier (31 May 2012). Depuis plus de 50 ans, le tissu économique luxembourgeois et les questions de politiques internationales façonnent le mix énergétique du pays (PDF). Le Luxembourg 1960-2010 (in French). STATEC - Institut national de la statistique et des études économiques.
- Trausch, Gérard (2012). Les mutations économiques et sociales de la société luxembourgeoise depuis la révolution française (PDF) (in French). STATEC - Institut national de la statistique et des études économiques.
- Trausch, Gérard (2014). 175 ans d'histoire luxembourgeoise: d'une économie rurale à une Place financière internationale (PDF). Cahier économique 2014 (in French). BIL – Banque Internationale à Luxembourg.
- Trausch, Gérard (July 2020). "Pensée sociale-démocrate suédoise et société luxembourgeoise" (PDF). Forum (in French) (408): 12–16.
- Weydert, Nico (22 April 2013). Les autres industries manufacturières depuis 1960 (PDF). Le Luxembourg 1960-2010 (in French). STATEC - Institut national de la statistique et des études économiques.
- Zahlen, Paul (13 December 2012c). L'évolution économique globale du Luxembourg sur la longue durée (PDF). Le Luxembourg 1960-2010 (in French). STATEC - Institut national de la statistique et des études économiques.

=== Society ===
- Docquier, Frédéric; Gordan, Ariane; Tenikue, Michel; Uljarevic, Aleksa (January 2025). "Understanding attitudes towards immigrants in Luxembourg's multicultural society" (PDF). LISER Policy Brief (2). Luxembourg Institute of Socio-Economic Research.
- van Kerm, Philippe; Salagean, Ioana; Amétépé, Fofo Senyo (2022). La COVID-19 au Luxembourg: Le gradient social de l'épidémie (PDF). Santé pour tous (in French). Ministère de la Santé.
- Licheron, Julien (2023). "Les prix de l'immobilier résidentiel au Luxembourg sur longue période (1975-2022)" (PDF). Rapport d'analyse de l'Observatoire de l'Habitat (in French) (6). Ministère du Logement et de l'Aménagement du territoire - Observatoire de l'Habitat.
- Scuto, Denis (20 November 2021). "Pauvre Luxembourg" (PDF). Tageblatt (in French). No. 271. p. 9.
- Thomas, Adrien (2023). "Trade unions in Luxembourg: Residual institutional strength and declining mobilization capacity". In Waddington, Jeremy; Müller, Torsten; Vandaele, Kurt (eds.). Trade Unions in the European Union: Picking up the pieces of the neoliberal challenge. Brussels: Peter Lang. pp. 731–762. doi:10.3726/b20254. ISBN 978-2-87574-634-4.
- Zahlen, Paul (5 September 2012a). 50 ans d'évolution démographique (PDF). Le Luxembourg 1960-2010 (in French). STATEC - Institut national de la statistique et des études économiques.
- Zahlen, Paul (6 September 2012b). 50 ans de migrations (PDF). Le Luxembourg 1960-2010 (in French). STATEC - Institut national de la statistique et des études économiques.
- Zięba-Kulawik, Karolina; Skoczylas, Konrad; Feltgen, Valérie; Paccoud, Antoine (October 2024). "Les tendances longues du développement urbain et résidentiel au Luxembourg (2004-2022)" (PDF). Note de l'Observatoire de l'Habitat (in French) (39). Ministère du Logement et de l'Aménagement du territoire - Observatoire de l'Habitat.
