= Remerschen nuclear power station =

Unrealised power station project in Luxembourg

Coordinates: 49°29′35″N 6°21′54″E

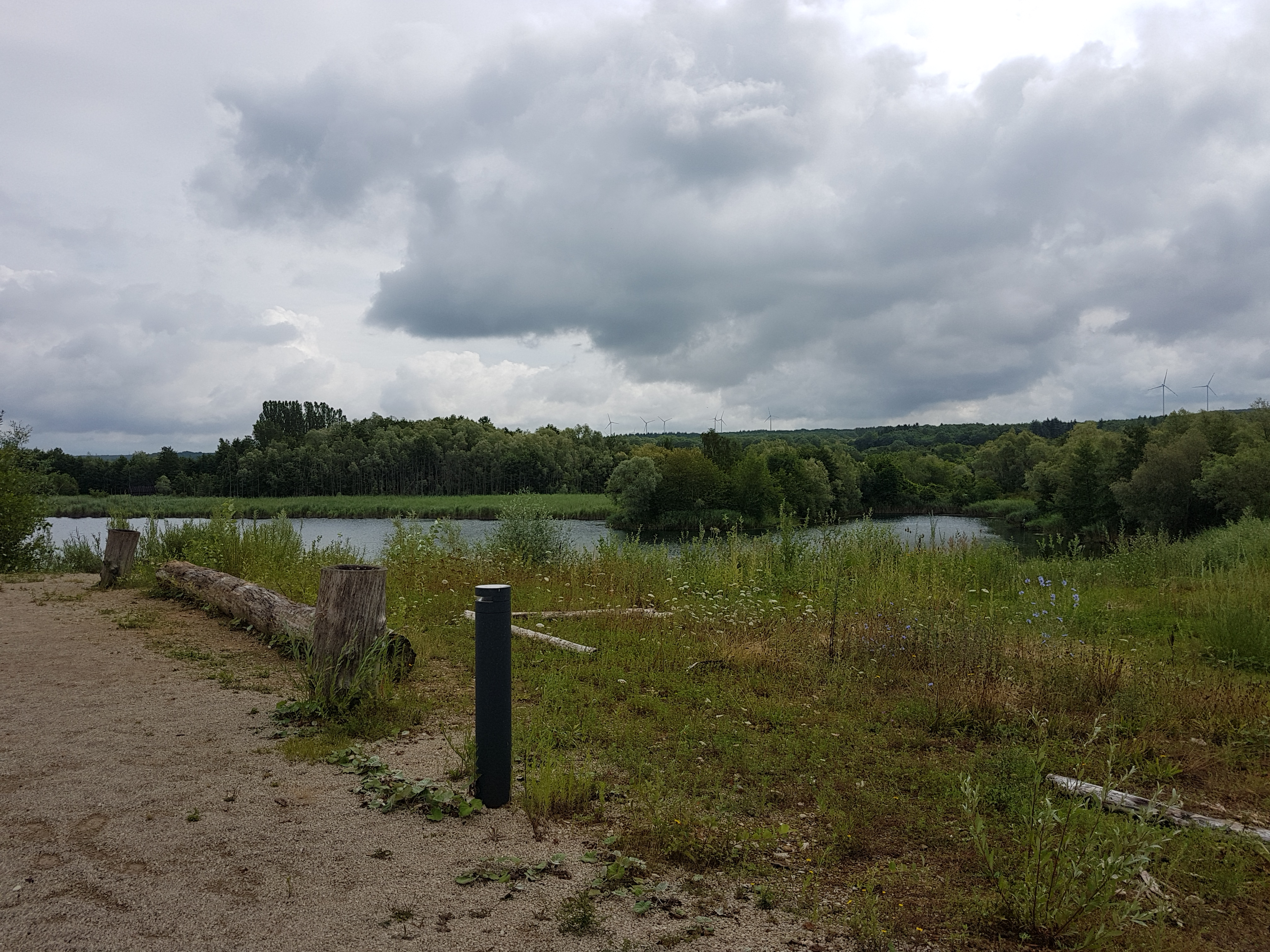
The intended site of the power station, today a conservation area

The Remerschen nuclear power station (Luxembourgish: Atomzentral vu Rëmerschen) was a proposed pressurized water reactor with an intended capacity of 1,300 Megawatt in Remerschen in south-east Luxembourg. It was in planning from 1973 and would have started operation in 1981, but was never built. It would have been the first nuclear power plant in Luxembourg. Already in its planning phase, it was in competition to the planned Cattenom Nuclear Power Plant that would later be built in France.

The Luxembourgish project was supported by the German government as well as the minister-presidents of Saarland (Franz-Josef Röder) and Rheinland-Pfalz (Helmut Kohl). It would have cost 1,5 billion Deutsche Mark, and at least 50% of its generated energy would have flowed to Germany.

== History ==
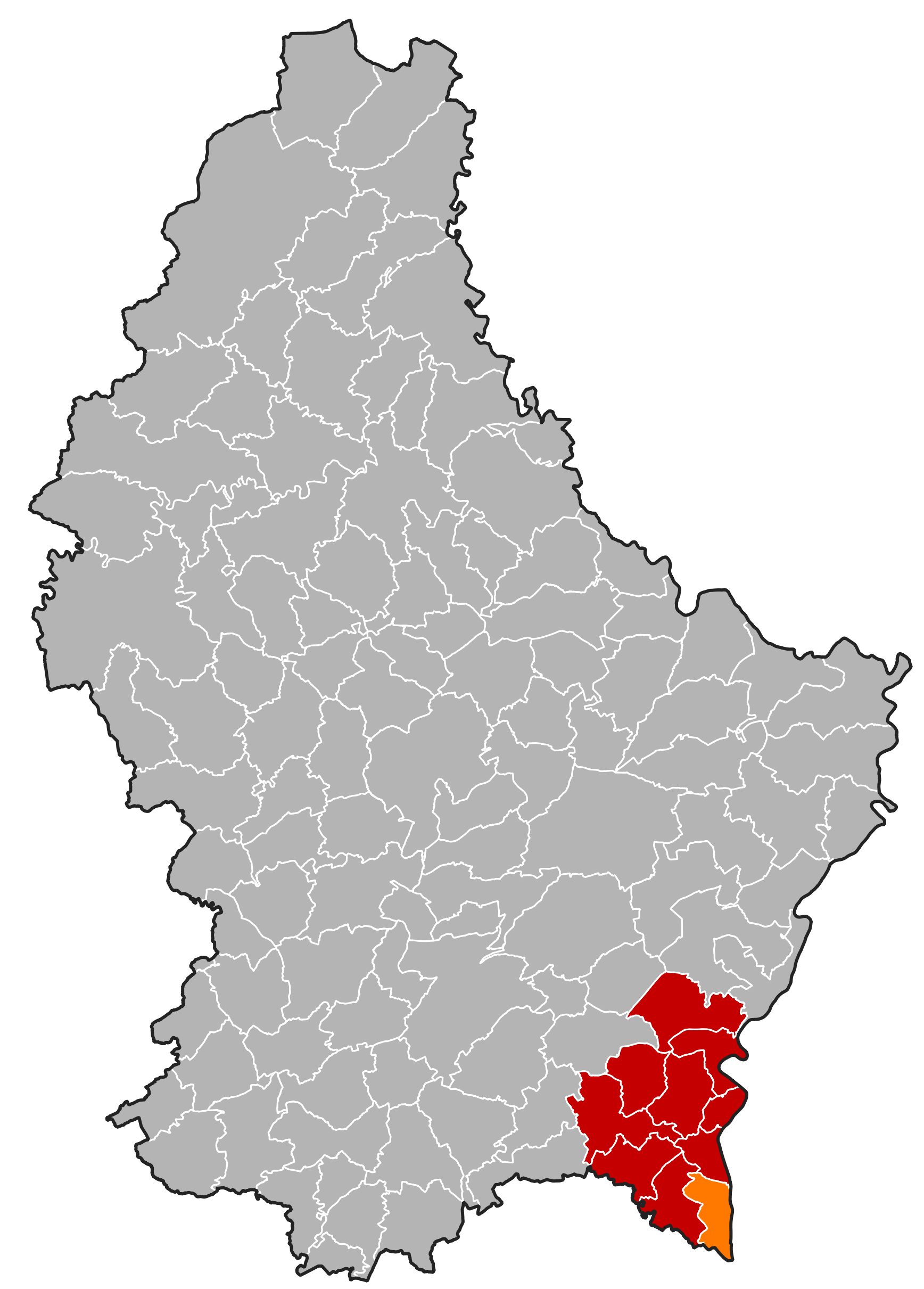
Locator map of the former commune of Remerschen, which merged with surrounding communes in 2011

On 25 March 1957, Luxembourg signed the Euratom Treaty together with five other European states, becoming a member of the European Atomic Energy Community.

Plans to build a nuclear power plant in Remerschen started in 1973. In November 1973 the energy company RWE informed the German government that it was seeking an agreement with the Luxembourgish government to construct a nuclear power station on Luxembourgish territory.

On 30 January 1974 the Société Luxembourgeoise d'Énergie Nucleaire S.A. (SENU) was founded as a Luxembourgish joint-stock company to plan, construct and manage this power plant. On 17 June 1973 an agreement was signed with a consortium consisting of the Swiss company Brown, Boveri & Cie and the German companies Babcock – Brown Boveri Reaktor GmbH and Hochtief AG.

Already in 1973, there was resistance to the planned power plant. There was also significant opposition to the Cattenom nuclear power plant from the initial plans to the mid 1990s in France, Luxembourg and Germany, especially Saarland. This opposition gained a significant boost from the successful prevention of the intended Remerschen power plant.

In January 1976, the communal council of Remerschen opposed the planned nuclear station. On 11 December 1977 the socialist LSAP party, which was then in government, voted narrowly for a moratorium and in December 1978 the Luxembourgish government could not get a majority of parliament to support the project. The nuclear power plant plans were definitively abandoned in 1979.

== Location ==
The location at Remerschen was chosen due to its location near the trilateral border area of France-Luxembourg-Germany and the low population density.

Today, it contains a conservation and recreation area and the "Biodiversum – Camille Gira".

== Technical data ==
The intended power plant at Remerschen would have been very similar in design to the Mülheim-Kärlich nuclear power plant that was under construction.

== References and further reading ==
- Ministère de l’Energie (Luxemburg), Senu: Braucht unser Land ein Atomkraftwerk?, o. J. (1976).
- Kayser, Paul (1992). La centrale nucléaire de Remerschen: Tout sur le projet luxembourgeois le plus ambitieux du siècle. Luxembourg.
- Mathieu, Monique (1999). "Die Schatten der Kühltürme". Lëtzebuerger Almanach vum Joerhonnert, 1900–1999. Luxembourg: Editions Guy Binsfeld. pp. 498–507.
- Tauer, Sandra (2012). "Fukushima mon amour – neue und alte Aspekte des Streits um die Kernkraft". Frankreich Jahrbuch 2011: Kulturnation Frankreich? Die kulturelle Dimension des gesellschaftlichen Wandel (in German). Springer. pp. 159–174.
- Tauer, Sandra (March 2013). "Kampfplatz Remerschen: Das Projekt eines Atomkraftwerks in Luxemburg aus Sicht deutscher und französischer Archive" (PDF). Forum (in German) (327): 60–63.
