= Luxembourg and the 2008 financial crisis =

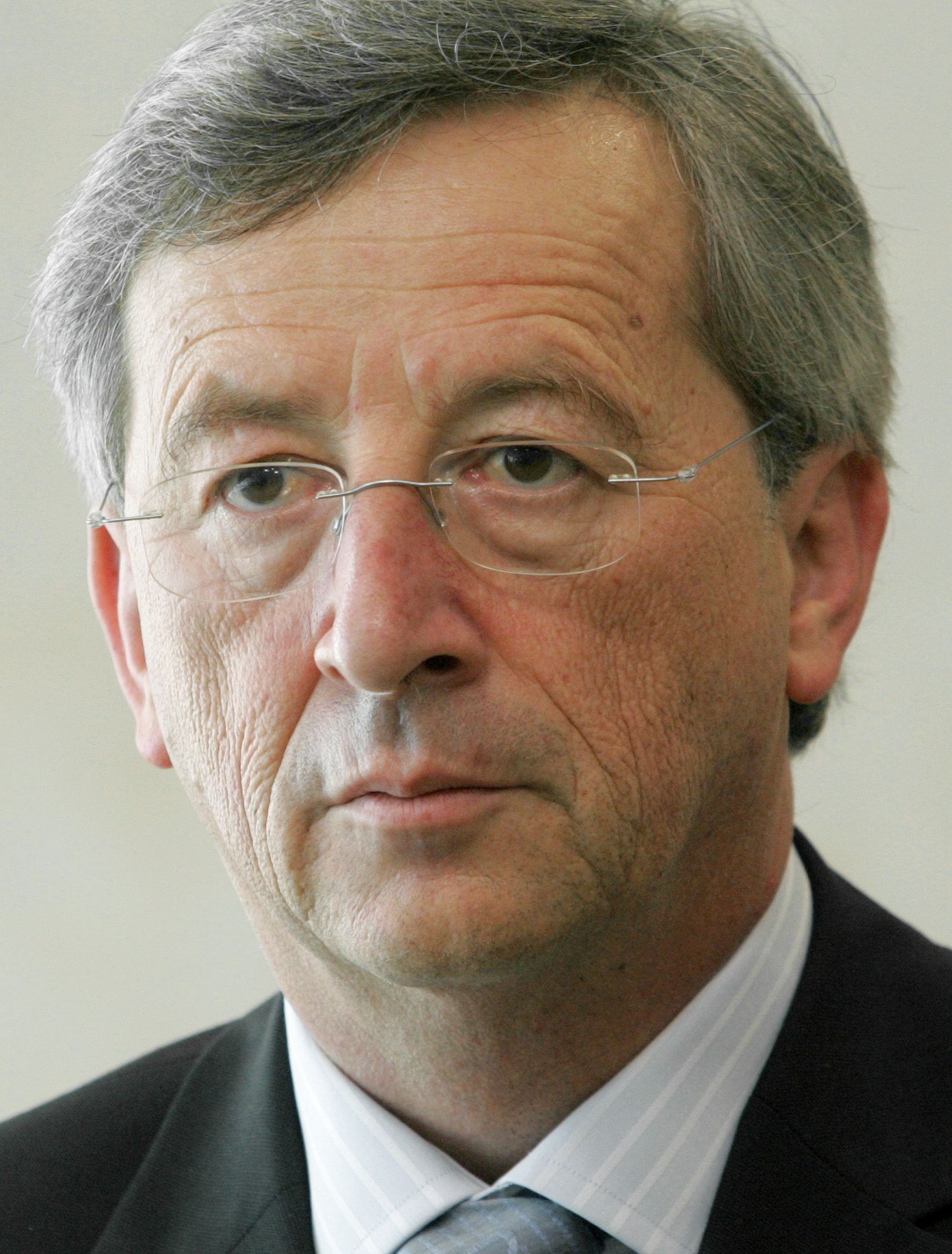
Jean-Claude Juncker (pictured) served as both Luxembourg's prime minister and finance minister during the crisis

Luxembourg and the 2008 financial crisis was how the 2008 financial crisis impacted Luxembourg and the actions taken by the Luxembourgish government in response. The financial sector is one of the main sectors of the economy of Luxembourg and was responsible for 29% of the country's GDP. The government had to rescue two major banks but its private banking sector remained relatively stable.

== History ==
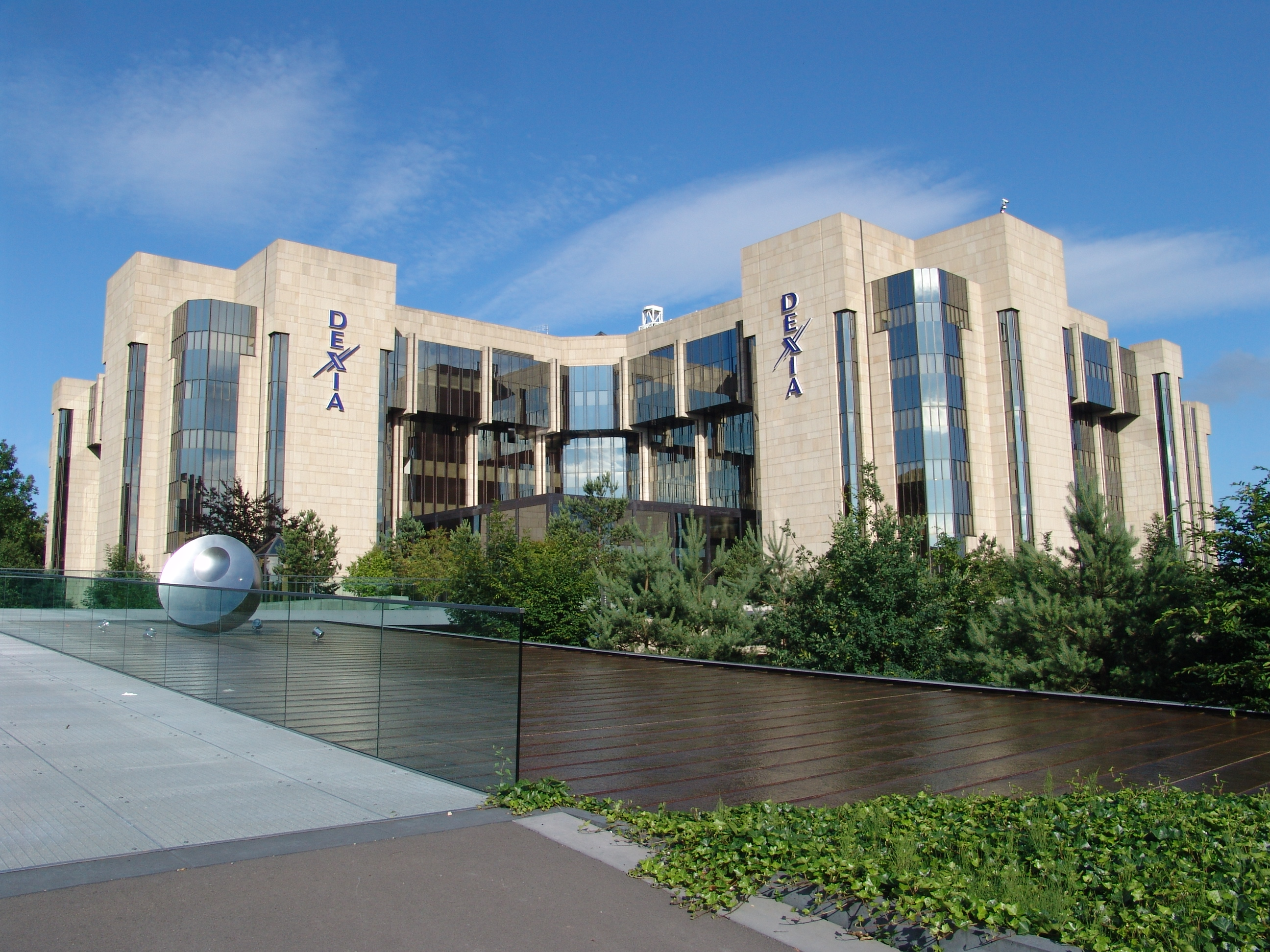
The Luxembourgish government intervened to rescue Dexia (headquarters pictured).

The 2008 financial crisis, which was the biggest financial calamity since the Great Depression, required state intervention by the Luxembourgish government, but it did not hit Luxembourg as severely as in other countries.

The crisis started with the collapse of the US sub-prime mortgage market in early 2007 and overlapped to the international financial system. From summer 2007, the interbank market was defined by an increased demand for funding and interbank operations in Luxembourg. Interbank loans from Luxembourgish banks rose until the bankruptcy of Lehman Brothers in September 2008. At that time, Luxembourg's financial sector represented one of the leading banking centers in the Eurozone. It was also the second-largest mutual fund center in the world and the leading reinsurance market in the European Union. The financial sector, as the main engine for Luxembourg's national economy, was responsible for 29% of the country's GDP, 12% of employment and circa one-fifth of the total tax revenues in 2008.

At the culmination of the crisis in 2008, the Luxembourgish government had to intervene in the rescue of Fortis and Dexia, two cross-border banks with large subsidiaries in Luxembourg. Fortis was a Belgian and Dutch merger, which had purchased Banque Générale du Luxembourg (BGL) in 2000. In December 2008, the Luxembourgish state converted a subordinated loan into shareholder's equity and held from there on one-third of the capital of BGL. The other two-thirds were acquired by the French BNP Paribas. Only a few months earlier, Fortis had won the Global Finance Award for the best bank in Belgium and Luxembourg and now it was dissolved. The other bank that needed government funding was Dexia, a group composed of a Belgian, a French and the Luxembourgish bank Banque internationale à Luxembourg (BIL). Dexia was at the time of the crisis the second largest employer after ArcelorMittal. The Belgian and French states provided €6 billion, while Luxembourg paid €376 million. The three governments offered a joint guarantee of €150 billion, out of which Luxembourg generated €4.5 billion. Furthermore, the Luxembourgish financial supervisor (Commission de Surveillance du Secteur Financier) placed subsidiaries of the Icelandic banks Glitnir Bank, Kaupthing and Landsbanki in judicial liquidation. The private banking sector in Luxembourg survived the crisis as one of the most profitable in Europe. This was due to the profit margin that was higher than that of the general banking industry. From the beginning of the crisis, no more than ten funds had been suspended. The Luxembourgish fund industry knew one of the strongest asset growths in 2009. Luxembourg's comparative stability throughout the crisis was in part due to its specialization in the fund industry. Funds experienced inflows of capital because financial assets worth billions of euros had been destroyed. Considering the employment in 2009, 2.9% of employees in the banking industry and 2.3% in the whole financial sector lost their jobs. These numbers were less severe than in the leading international financial centers New York and London, where job losses lay at 8.8% and 15.3% respectively.
