= Halinga Parish =

Former municipality of Estonia

Coordinates: 58°37′N 24°30′E

Halinga Parish Halinga vald
- Municipality of Estonia
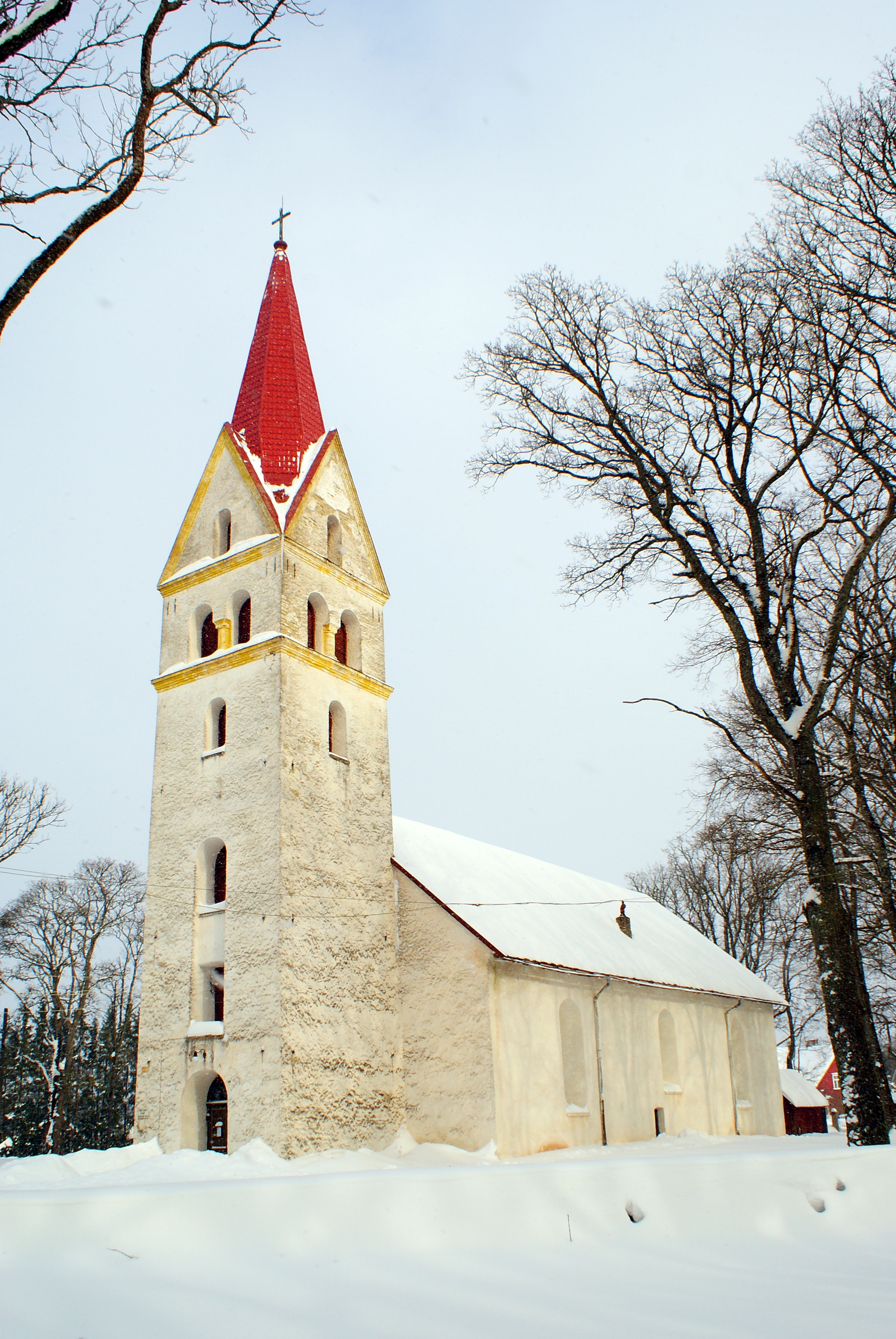
- Pärnu-Jaagupi church

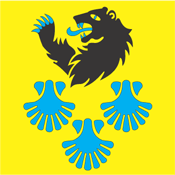
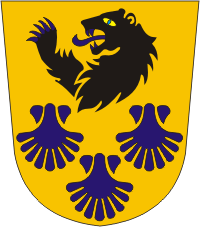
- Flag Coat of arms

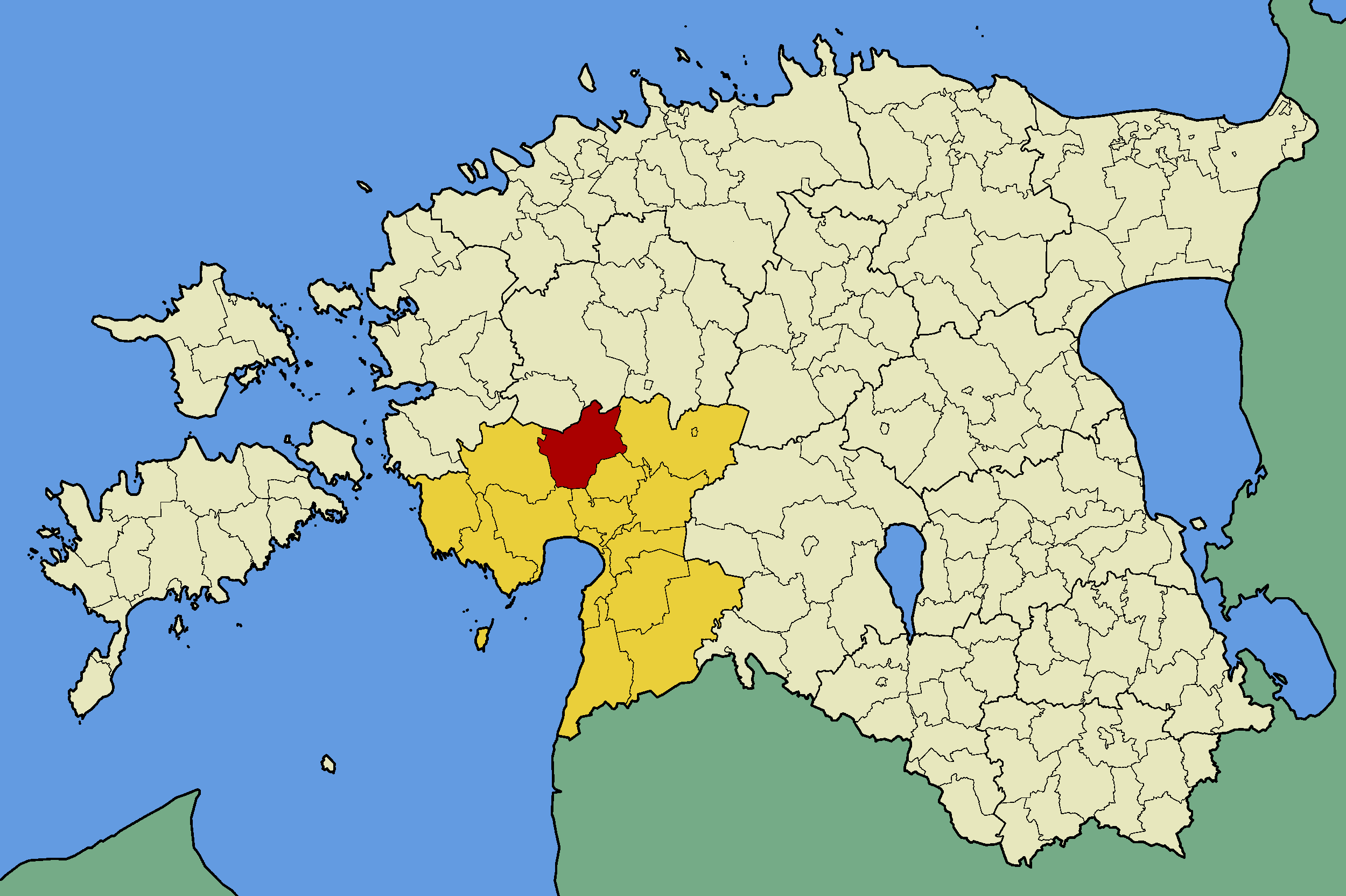
- Halinga Parish within Pärnu County.
- Country: Estonia
- County: Pärnu County
- Administrative centre: Pärnu-Jaagupi

Area
  - Total: 365 km^{2} (141 sq mi)

Population (01.01.2006)
  - Total: 3,492
  - Density: 9.57/km^{2} (24.8/sq mi)
- Website: www.halingavald.ee

Halinga was a municipality located in Pärnu County, one of the 15 counties of Estonia.

== Settlements ==
Borough

Pärnu-Jaagupi

Villages

Aasa, Altküla, Anelema, Arase, Eametsa, Eense, Eerma, Enge, Ertsma, Halinga, Helenurme, Kablima, Kaelase, Kangru, Kodesmaa, Kuninga, Langerma, Lehtmetsa, Lehu, Libatse, Loomse, Maima, Mõisaküla, Mäeküla, Naartse, Oese, Pallika, Pereküla, Pitsalu, Pööravere, Roodi, Rukkiküla, Salu, Sepaküla, Sõõrike, Soosalu, Tarva, Tõrdu, Tühjasma, Vahenurme, Vakalepa, Valistre, Vee.
