= Vändra Parish =

Former municipality of Estonia

Coordinates: 58.619°N 24.920°E

Vändra Parish Vändra vald
- Former municipality of Estonia
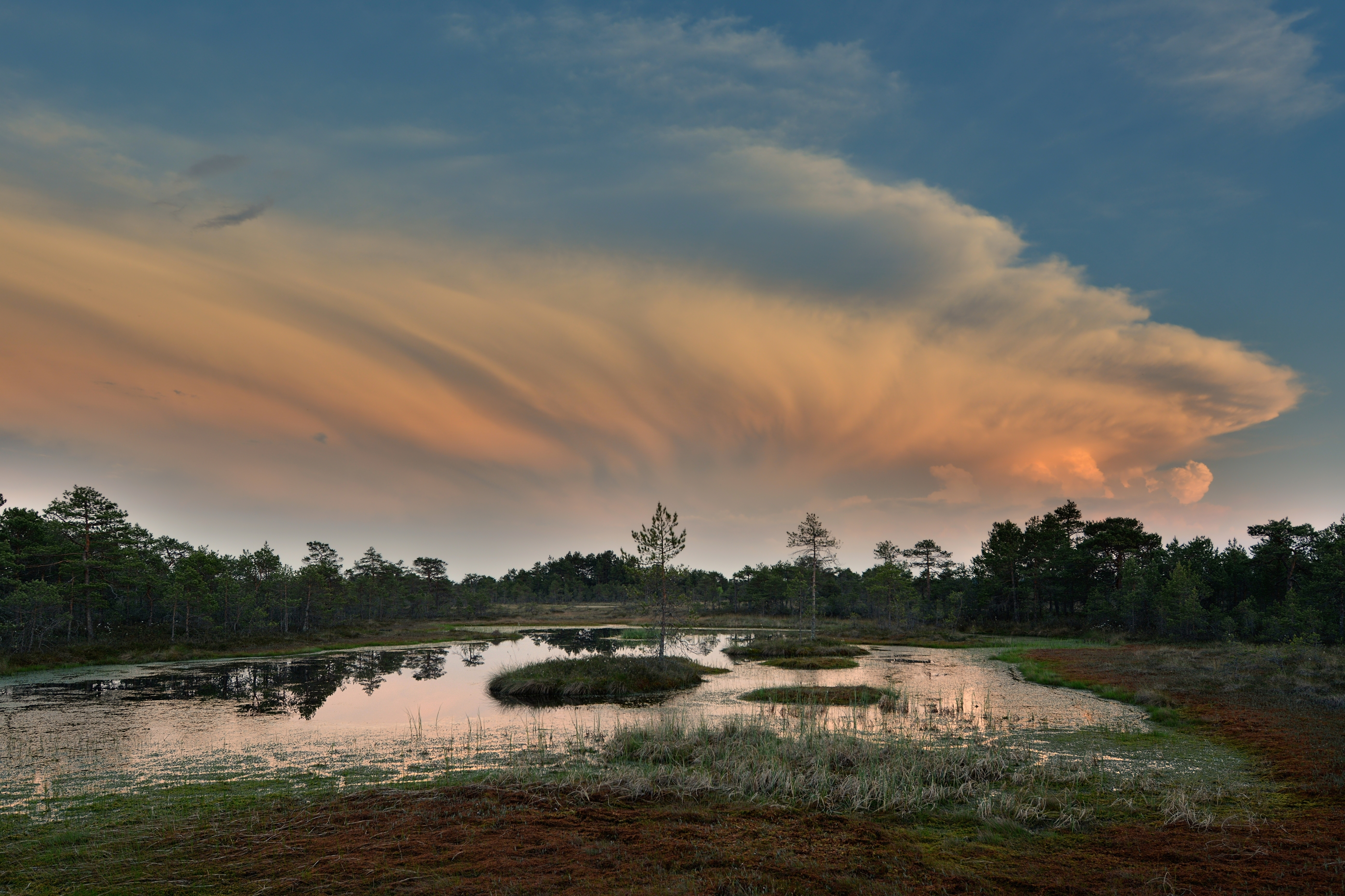
- Mõrdama bog

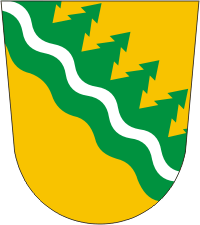
- Flag Coat of arms

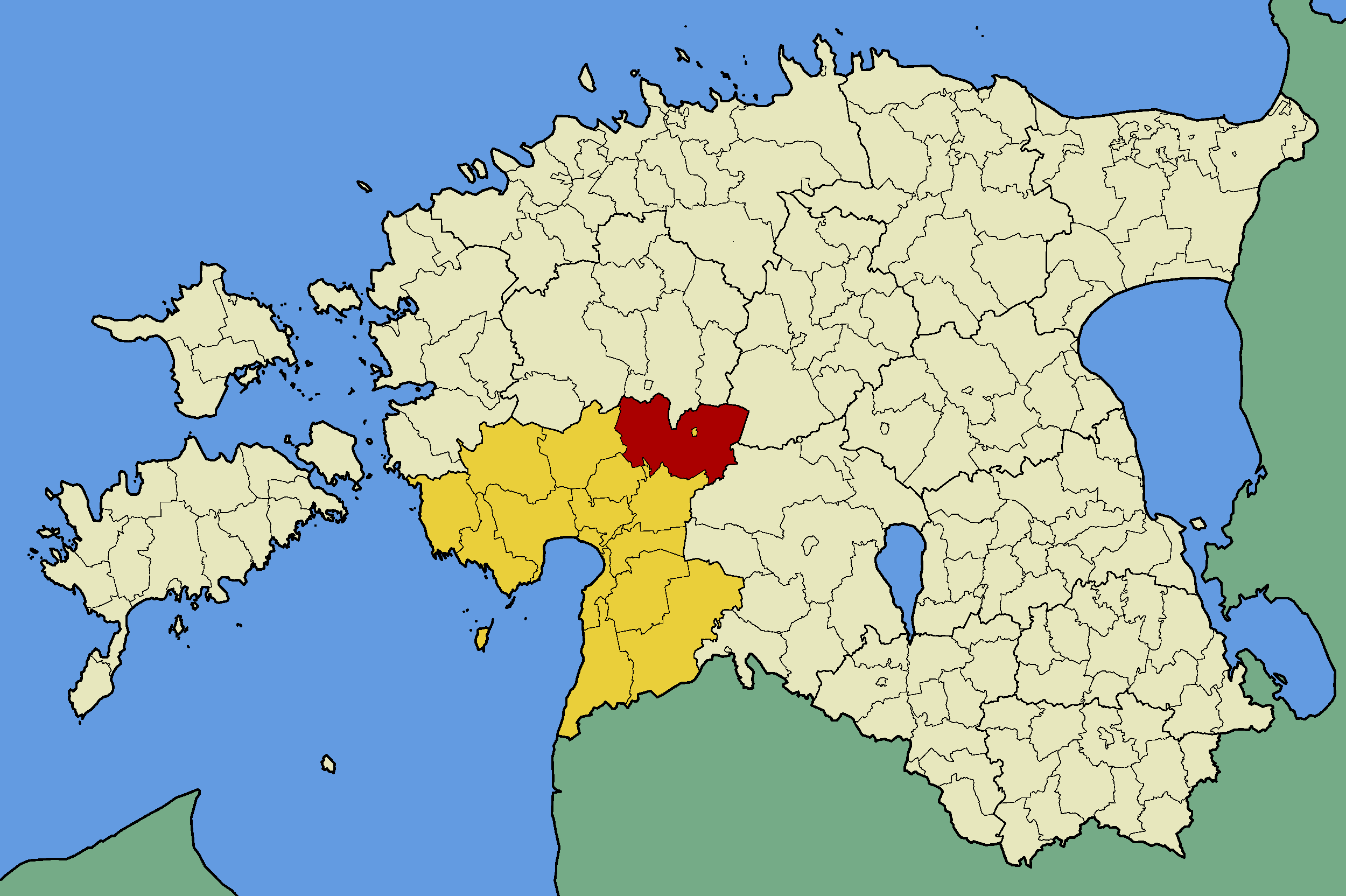
- Vändra Parish within Pärnu County.
- Country: Estonia
- County: Pärnu County
- Administrative centre: Vändra

Area
  - Total: 642 km^{2} (248 sq mi)

Population (01.12.2012)
  - Total: 2,861
  - Density: 4.46/km^{2} (11.5/sq mi)
- Website: www.vandravald.ee

Vändra Parish was an Estonian municipality located in Pärnu County. It had a population of 2,861 (as of 1 December 2012) and covered an area of 642 km².

On 27 October 2009 the neighbouring Kaisma Parish was merged with Vändra Parish.

== Settlements ==
Villages

Aluste - Allikõnnu - Kaansoo - Kadjaste - Kaisma - Kalmaru - Kergu - Kirikumõisa - Kobra - Kõnnu - Kose - Kullimaa - Kurgja - Leetva - Luuri - Lüüste - Mädara - Massu - Metsavere - Metsaküla - Mustaru - Oriküla - Pärnjõe - Rae - Rahkama - Rahnoja - Rätsepa - Reinumurru - Rõusa - Säästla - Samliku - Sikana - Sohlu - Suurejõe - Tagassaare - Ünnaste - Vaki - Venekuusiku - Veskisoo - Vihtra - Viluvere - Võidula - Võiera
