= Kaisma Parish =

Municipality of Estonia

Coordinates: 58°41′N 24°47′E

Kaisma Parish Kaisma vald
- Former municipality of Estonia
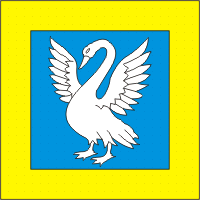
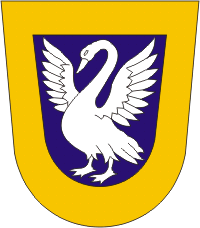
- Flag Coat of arms

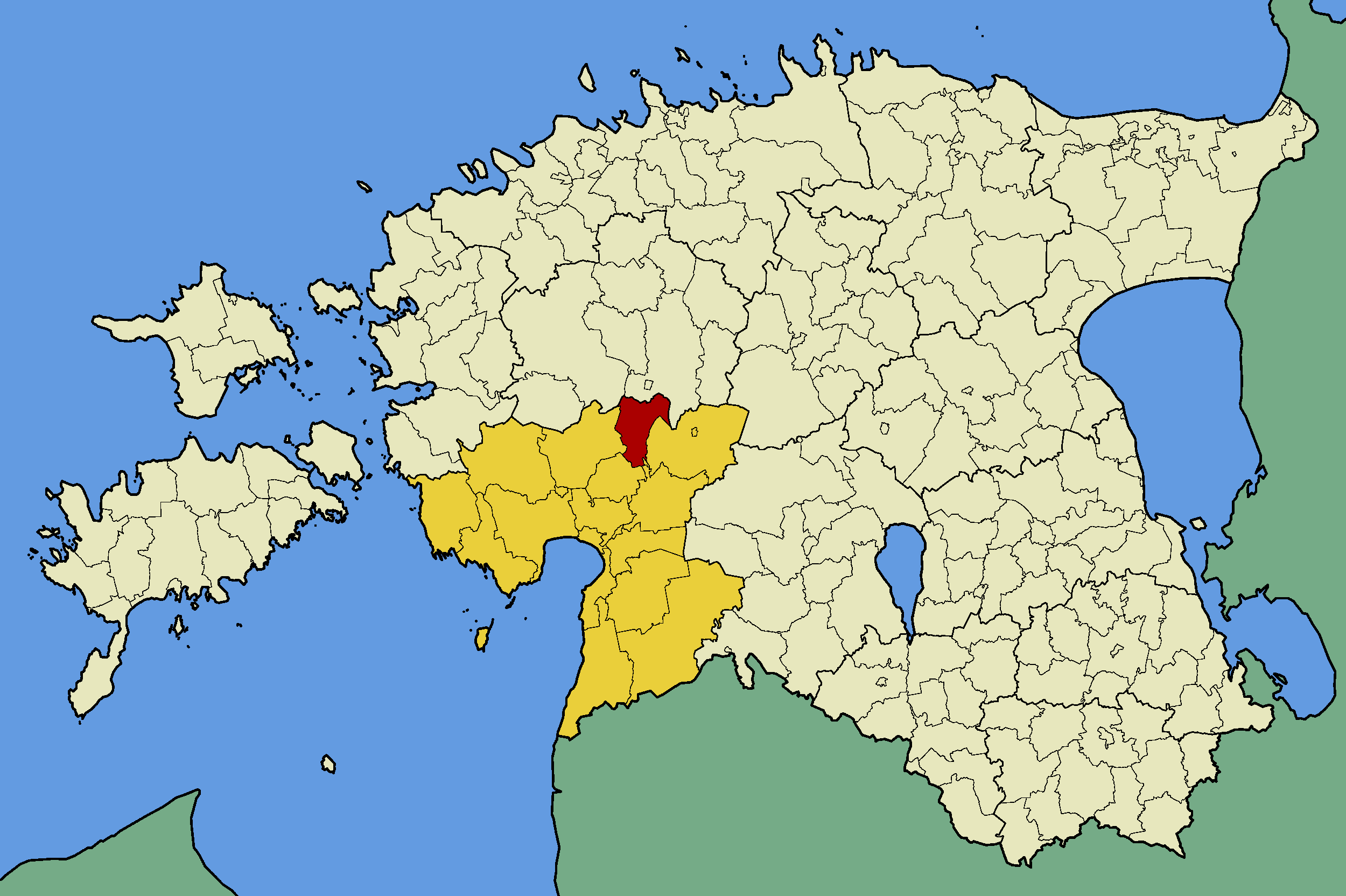
- Kaisma Parish within Pärnu County in 2009.
- Country: Estonia
- County: Pärnu County
- Administrative centre: Kaisma

Area
  - Total: 183.98 km^{2} (71.04 sq mi)

Population (01.01.2009)
  - Total: 566
  - Density: 3.08/km^{2} (7.97/sq mi)
- Website: www.kaisma.ee

Kaisma Parish (Kaisma vald) was a municipality located in Pärnu County, Estonia. On 27 October 2009 it was merged into Vändra Parish. It had a population of 566 (as of 1 January 2009) and an area of 183.98 km^{2}.

== Settlements ==
Villages

Kaisma - Kergu - Kõnnu - Metsaküla - Metsavere - Rahkama - Sohlu
