= Arase =

Arase may refer to:

- Arase (satellite), formerly known as ERG, a scientific satellite to study Van Allen belts
- Arase, Estonia, village in Põhja-Pärnumaa Parish, Pärnu County, Estonia

== People with the surname ==
- Arase Nagahide (荒勢 永英, 1949–2008), Japanese sumo wrestler
- Toru Arase (荒瀬 徹, born 1935), Japanese water polo player
- Yota Arase (荒瀬 洋太, born 1982), Japanese swimmer
