= Põhja-Pärnumaa Parish =

Municipality of Estonia

Põhja-Pärnumaa Parish Põhja-Pärnumaa vald
- Municipality of Estonia
- Flag Coat of arms

- Põhja-Pärnumaa Parish within Pärnu County.
- Country: Estonia
- County: Pärnu County
- Administrative centre: Vändra and Pärnu-Jaagupi

Area
  - Total: 1,013 km^{2} (391 sq mi)

Population
  - Total: 8,435
  - Density: 8.327/km^{2} (21.57/sq mi)
- ISO 3166 code: EE-638
- Website: http://www.pparnumaa.ee/

Põhja-Pärnumaa Parish (Estonian: Põhja-Pärnumaa vald) is a rural municipality in Pärnu County.

== Settlements ==
Beside the boroughs of Pärnu-Jaagupi, Tootsi and Vändra, there are 86 villages: Aasa, Allikõnnu, Altküla, Aluste, Anelema, Arase, Eametsa, Eense , Eerma, Enge, Ertsma , Halinga, Helenurme, Kaansoo, Kablima , Kadjaste, Kaelase, Kaisma, Kalmaru, Kangru , Kergu, Kirikumõisa , Kobra , Kodesmaa, Kõnnu , Kose , Kullimaa , Kuninga , Kurgja, Langerma , Leetva, Lehtmetsa , Lehu, Libatse, Loomse, Luuri, Lüüste, Mädara, Mäeküla, Maima, Massu, Metsavere, Metsaküla , Mõisaküla, Mustaru, Naartse, Oese, Oriküla, Pallika , Pärnjõe, Pereküla, Pitsalu, Pööravere , Rae, Rahkama, Rahnoja , Rätsepa, Reinumurru, Roodi , Rõusa, Rukkiküla, Säästla, Salu , Samliku, Sepaküla , Sikana, Sohlu, Sõõrike, Soosalu , Suurejõe, Tagassaare, Tarva, Tõrdu, Tühjasma, Ünnaste, Vahenurme, Vakalepa, Vaki , Valistre, Vee, Venekuusiku, Veskisoo, Vihtra , Viluvere, Võidula and Võiera.

== Religion ==
In terms of religion in the 2021 census, 7.2% of the residents of Põhja-Pärnumaa Parish declared themselves Lutheran, 2.6% declared themselves Orthodox, 0.3% other Christians. 88.1% declared of the residents of the municipality themselves religiously unaffiliated. 1.1 % of the population followed other religions or did not specify their religious affiliation.

== Notable people ==
- Friedrich Schmidt (1832 in Kaisma - 1908), a Baltic German geologist and botanist, discovered Sakhalin Fir in 1866
- Aleksander Paulus (1872 in Põhja-Pärnumaa Parish – 1953), Orthodox clergyman, Archbishop of Tallinn, 1920 to 1923, and politician.
- Artur Lossmann (1877 in Vana-Vändra Parish – 1972), a Major-General, and prominent military medicine specialist
- Hermann von Keyserling (1880 in Kõnnu – 1946), a Baltic German philosopher from the Keyserlingk family.
- Juhan Narma (1888 in Aluste 1942), politician, Minister of Finance, 1940
- Ado Rõõmussaar (1891 in Uue-Vändra Parish – 1970), politician, Mayor of Uue-Vändra Parish, 1917 to 1920, and 1930 to 1931
- Avdy Andresson (1899 in Viluvere – 1990), Minister of War in exile, 1973 to 1990
- Herta Elviste (1923 in Pärnu-Jaagupi – 2015), stage, film and TV actress and assistant theatre director
- Volli Kalm (1953 in Aluste – 2017), geologist and the rector of the University of Tartu, 2012 to 2017.
- Urmas Arumäe (born 1957 in Tootsi), attorney, associate professor, Estonian Business School, and Minister of Justice in 1994
- Mart Toome (born 1980 in Enge), stage, TV, and film actor.
- Berle Brant (born 1989 in Halinga), footballer who has played 25 games for Estonia women's national football team
