= Lists of electoral districts by country and territory =

Electoral districts go by different names depending on the country and the office being elected. Some countries use single-member districts and some use multi-member districts.

The United Kingdom uses single-member constituencies. Most of the rest of the Commonwealth of Nations also use constituencies as electoral divisions.

== Argentina ==
The 257 members of the Chamber of Deputies are elected by proportional representation in 24 multi-member constituencies based on the provinces (plus the Autonomous city of Buenos Aires). Each one has a minimum of 5 seats and a maximum of 70.

For the 72 members of the Senate, each province (plus the City of Buenos Aires) has a fixed number of three senators.

== Armenia ==
Beginning with the 2017 parliamentary election, the Armenian National Assembly elects members by proportional representation. Half the seats are filled from closed national party lists. The other half are chosen from 13 electoral districts allowing open list voter choice. As seat distribution is calculated at the national level, each electoral district is not guaranteed to return a specific number of seats. Each marz is coterminous with an electoral district with the exceptions of Vayots Dzor and Syunik (which are merged into one) and the Yerevan capital region, which is divided into 4 electoral districts.

== Australia ==
In Australia, federal constituencies are officially termed divisions, and their state counterparts electoral districts. At both levels, though, they are popularly referred to as electorates or seats.

== Bahamas ==
The Bahamas uses 39 single-member constituencies elected by the first-past-the-post system for elections to the Bahamas House of Assembly.

== Bangladesh ==
Bangladesh has 300 parliamentary constituencies. There is one member of Parliament for each constituency. According to the constitution, the 50 seats reserved for women are allocated to the political parties according to their proportional representation.

== Barbados ==
Barbados has 30 parliamentary constituencies. Some constituencies cover entire parishes while some parishes contain multiple constituencies depending on the population. Each constituency has a seat which is occupied by a representative who sits in the House of Assembly (the lower house) as a member of parliament. Prior to 1971, there were once dual representatives for each constituency instead.

== Botswana ==
Botswana has 57 parliamentary constituencies. There is one member of Parliament for each constituency.

== Brazil ==
In Brazil, seats in the lower chamber of the National Congress (Câmara dos Deputados) are split throughout the 26 States and the Federal District in a roughly proportional manner; however, a guaranteed minimum of 8 seats and maximum of 70 per federal entity means voters in Roraima have more than 8 times the representation as voters in São Paulo. The States of São Paulo and Minas Gerais have the largest number of seats. Within each federal entity, representatives are chosen by open-list proportional voting.

For the senate, each federal entity (state or federal district) has a fixed number of three senators. Each quadrennial election alternates between electing one and two senators per federal entity.

== Bulgaria ==
In Bulgaria there are 31 constituencies arranged so as to coincide with the administrative division of Bulgaria, with the exception of Sofia City and Plovdiv provinces, where there are 3 additional constituencies (Sofia City is divided into 3 constituencies and Plovdiv is divided into 2). They are numbered according to their alphabetical order in Cyrillic.

Experimentally in the 2009 Bulgarian parliamentary election, 31 out of the 240 Members of Parliament were elected by majority vote, while the remaining 209 were elected by proportional vote. This mixed electoral system was rejected later.

== Canada ==
In Canada, constituencies are legally known as electoral districts (in French, circonscriptions) for Members of Parliament; and Members of Legislative Assemblies or Members of Provincial Parliament (Ontario), Members of the National Assembly (Quebec), or Members of the House of Assembly (Newfoundland and Labrador) at the provincial level, although "constituency" and the informal term "riding" (or "comté" in French) are also used.

== Chile ==
Chile's bicameral Congress consists of a Chamber of Deputies (lower house) and a Senate (upper house). The country is divided into 28 electoral districts for the lower house and 15 senatorial constituencies for the Senate. Each electoral district elects between 3 and 8 deputies and each senatorial constituency elects 3, 4 or 5 senators; there are 155 deputies and 43 senators in total. From 2022 the number of senators will increase to 50 because only the half of the senators are elected every election. Before the 2017 election, both seats in two-seat electoral districts were filled in the same election; after 2017, there are plurinominal districts.

== China, People's Republic of ==
The electoral districts exists in China's sole governmental organ, the National People's Congress, with 2,977 seated in which the constituencies are represented by the delegates who are elected in the respective people's congresses in 23 provinces, 4 directly-controlled municipalities, 5 autonomous regions, 2 special administrative regions and the People's Liberation Army which function as at-large electoral districts. Generally, seats are apportioned to each electoral district in proportion to their population, though the system for apportioning seats for Hong Kong, Macau, Taiwan and the PLA differ. No electoral district may be apportioned fewer than 15 seats in the NPC.

== Croatia ==
The Croatian Parliament electoral districts (Croatian: izborne jedinice) are the special territorial subdivisions of Croatia used for the country's parliamentary elections.

Croatia has 12 electoral districts. Ten of these are geographical districts within Croatia, each electing 14 members of Croatian Parliament. District XI is for Croatian citizens living abroad, with 3 members of parliament (until 2011, it elected a maximum 12 members of parliament, depending on turnout). District XII is for national minorities, with 8 members of parliament.

The first ten districts are roughly based on geography, and arranged so that each district has roughly the same number of registered voters, around 400,000. These districts therefore do not correspond to the boundaries of top-level administrative divisions within Croatia, and each district contains one or more or parts of several Croatian counties.

== Denmark ==
Constituencies are used for elections to the Folketing.

== Estonia ==
There are 12 electoral districts (valimisringkonnad) for the parliamentary elections in Estonia. Each district elects 5 to 14 members to the 101-member Riigikogu. The capital and largest city Tallinn constitutes three electoral districts, and the second largest city Tartu one. Other districts are divided by the 15 counties. Two of the districts are each made up by 3 counties; 3 districts by 2 counties; and the three remaining counties each make up a separate electoral district.

All municipalities have at least one electoral district in their local elections. In the 2005, 2009 and 2013 local elections, Tallinn had 8 electoral districts, one for each administrative district of the city. In 2009 Vändra Parish, which merged with Kaisma Parish, also had 2 electoral districts. In 2005 Suure-Jaani Parish, merged from 4 different parishes, had 4 electoral districts and Türi Parish had 2 electoral districts.

In elections to the European Parliament the whole country constitutes one electoral district.

== Falkland Islands ==
The Falkland Islands are divided into two constituencies, the Camp and Stanley which return three and five members respectively to the Legislative Assembly. The Camp constituency includes any part of the Falklands which is not within the boundaries of the Stanley constituency (which are defined by a 3.5 mile radius from the cathedral spire).

A referendum had been held in 2001 in which both Camp and Stanley voters rejected a change to a single constituency.

The Constitution now specifically allows for the constituencies and their boundaries to be amended, but such an amendment must be supported in a referendum and, as a protection, there must be a two-thirds majority in each constituency.

A further referendum was held on 3 November 2011: Stanley voters narrowly supported a single constituency (but without a two-thirds majority) and Camp voters emphatically rejected a single constituency. (Mercopress report on the 2011 referendum result)

== Finland ==
The Finnish Eduskunta, or Parliament, is made up of 200 members, elected from 15 separate geographic areas, or electoral districts. All of the constituencies, with the exception of Åland, elect multiple members, ranging between six and 35 depending on the constituency's population. The constituency division is based on the old (1634–1997) provinces of Finland, and has remained more or less the same since the first elections for the Eduskunta in 1907.

A special case is the constituency of Åland, which only elects one member of parliament. Even though the region of Åland is much smaller than any of the other constituencies, Finnish law gives a special status for the region and it gets a seat even if its population would not entitle it to one.

== France ==
In France, electoral constituencies are known as circonscriptions électorales.

For parliamentary elections, they are known as circonscriptions législatives, and for departmental ones, France uses cantons.

== Germany ==
In Germany, there are 299 basic electoral constituencies (called Wahlkreise), accounting for half of the 598 nominal seats in the German Bundestag in a "first past the post" electoral system. These constituencies are divided so that each has approximately the same number of voters. The constituencies for the rest of the seats are the federal states, representatives being drawn from the top of their respective electoral lists. German electoral law dictates that the deviation from average of all constituencies shall not exceed a certain figure. Other restrictions prevent abuses such as gerrymandering.

Similar provisions apply for many of the federal state parliaments, though constituencies are generally smaller and boundaries change more frequently. Members of the European Parliament are elected by party list proportional representation at the national level.

=== States ===
- Electoral districts in Bremen
- List of electoral districts in the Landtag of Brandenburg
- List of state constituencies in Saxony

== Greece ==
The Greek Parliament (Voulí ton Ellínon) has 300 members, elected for a four-year term by a system of 'reinforced' proportional representation in 56 constituencies, 48 of which are multi-seat and 8 single-seat. Seats are determined by constituency voting, and voters may select the candidate or candidates of their choice by marking their name on the party ballot. However, the party receiving the largest number of votes receives a 50-seat premium, which is filled by candidates of that party not declared elected on the lower rungs (the constituencies).

== Hong Kong ==
The unicameral Legislative Council has 90 members following the 2021 electoral reforms, 20 returned from ten geographical constituencies elected by single non-transferable vote, 30 returned through functional constituencies and 40 through the Election Committee constituency elected by 1,500 members in the Election Committee.

== Iceland ==
In Iceland, there are 6 constituencies, which are Norðvesturkjördæmi "Northwest", Norðausturkjördæmi "Northeast", Suðvesturkjördæmi "Southwest", Suðurkjördæmi "South", Reykjavíkurkjördæmi norður "North Reykjavik", and Reykjavíkurkjördæmi suður "South Reykjavik". The Icelandic word for constituency is kjördæmi.

== India ==
In India a constituency is an area, where people of this notified area elect their representative either to Lok Sabha or the State Legislative Assembly or local governing bodies. India has a multi-tier democratic system. The apex legislative body of India which forms part of the Parliament of India is Lok Sabha (lower house); then there are State Legislatures, also called state legislative assemblies, then District Councils, Block Development Councils and Village Councils for rural local bodies and Municipal Corporations, Municipal Councils and Town Councils. Hence every area has a constituency under which it falls.

== Indonesia ==
For People's Representative Council (DPR), there are 80 multi-member electoral districts called daerah pemilihan. Numbers may vary from 3-10 members for every district. Indonesians abroad are represented in Jakarta's 2nd electoral district, which also represent Central and South Jakarta. Regional assembly (province and municipalities) also have their own electoral districts. Regional Representative Council (DPD) elects 4 members per province, regardless of size and population.

== Iran ==
Constituencies are used for elections to the Iranian Parliament.

== Ireland ==
Dáil constituencies in Ireland elect between three and five Teachtaí Dála (TDs) using the Single transferable vote method.

== Italy ==
For the election of the Italian Chamber of Deputies, since 1993 Italy is divided in 27 districts called circoscrizioni. However, the distribution of seats is calculated at national level, and the districts serve only to choose the single candidates inside the party lists. In the election of the Italian Senate, according to the Constitution, each Region is a single district, without connections at national level.

In the regional elections, the districts correspond to the Provinces, even if some seats are allocated at regional level. For the Provincial elections, a special system is used, based on localized lists: even if the competition is disputed on provincial level, candidates are presented in single-member districts, and their final position inside each party list depends by the percentage of votes they received in their own districts. Finally, for the Communal elections no districts are used.

== Jamaica ==
Constituencies are used for elections to the Parliament of Jamaica.

== Japan ==
Japan's National Diet consists of two houses. The House of Representatives, also known as the Lower House, consists of 295 single-member districts and 11 multi-member (6-29 members) proportional representation blocks that represent broader regions of the country. This gives a total of 475 members in the house.

The House of Councillors (Upper House) has 47 districts of 2-10 members that correspond with the 47 prefectures of Japan and a national proportional representation block that elects 96 members, giving a total of 242 members in the house. As a result of imbalances in the representation of rural and urban voters, legislation has changed the number of members representing some districts, while some rural districts will be merged by 2019.

== Kuwait ==
There are five electoral districts in Kuwait.

== Lebanon ==
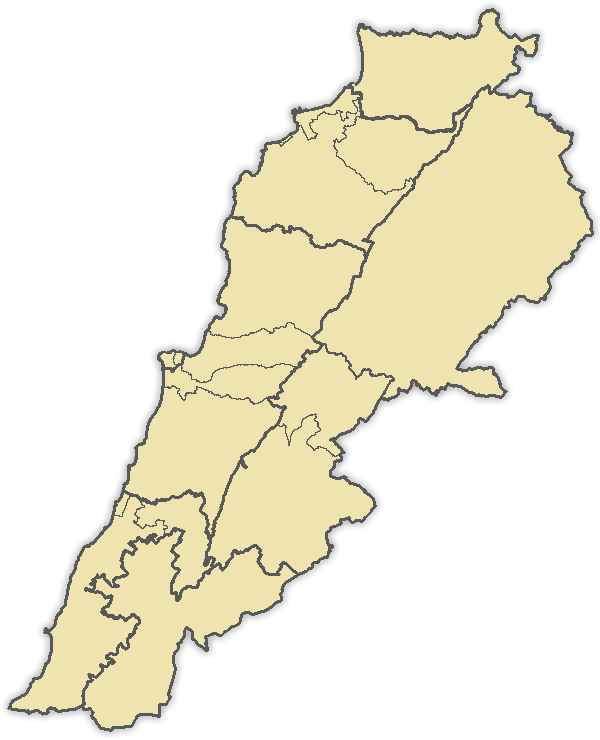
Electoral districts of Lebanon (2017 Vote Law)

Lebanon has multi-seat constituencies.

== Liberia ==
In Liberia, there are 64 electoral districts, each of which sends a single member to the House of Representatives. Each representative is elected by the first past the post system.

== Liechtenstein ==
The 11 municipalities of Liechtenstein are divided into the two electoral districts (Wahlkreise) of Oberland and Unterland.

== Luxembourg ==
Luxembourg has four parliamentary multi-seat constituencies called electoral circonscriptions. The respective numbers of seats are proportional to the numbers of voters living in each constituency. The election method used is the system of open lists of party candidates, which means that in each constituency the respective parties obtain a number of seats in proportion to the total of votes given to their candidates, with the voters choosing the candidates they prefer (panachage).

Each circonscription is composed of cantons (administrative districts). These are their names, the cantons they are composed of (in brackets the canton names in French and Luxembourgish) and the number of parliamentary seats:

- South (Esch/Alzette - Esch/Uelzecht; Capellen), 24 seats
- Centre (Luxembourg - Lëtzebuerg; Mersch - Miersch), 21 seats
- North (Clervaux - Klierf; Diekirch - Dikrech; Wiltz - Wolz; Redange - Réiden; Vianden - Veianen), 9 seats
- East (Echternach - Ierchternach; Grewenmacher - Gréiwemaacher; Remich - Réimech), 6 seats

== Malaysia ==
There are 222 parliamentary constituencies in Malaysia. The seats are indicated as P.xxx. Each constituency is represented by an elected Member of Parliament who sits at the lower house of the Parliament of Malaysia called Dewan Rakyat. With the exception of Federal Territory parliamentary seats, these constituencies are further divided into 600 state legislative assembly districts, whose representative will sit at their respective state legislative assembly. The state assembly seats are indicated as N.xx. Apart from the elected constituencies, there's additional appointed seats in the state legislative assemblies of Sabah and Terengganu.

== Malta ==
There are currently 13 electoral districts, each consist of various localities, although in some cases, localities are divided between districts in order to obtain a roughly equal spread of population. Each of these districts elects 5 members to parliament, using the single transferable vote (STV) method.

== Mexico ==
The federal electoral districts are the 300 constituencies or electoral districts into which Mexico is divided for federal elections. Each district returns one federal deputy, who sits in the Chamber of Deputies, the lower house of the Congress of the Union. An additional 200 deputies are elected by proportional representation from five electoral regions.

== Namibia ==
Constituency is used as an administrative division.

== New Zealand ==
New Zealand uses a proportional representation system, with a parliament nominally consisting of 120 seats. Of these, 65 are general electorate seats, with 14 of these seats being for South Island constituencies and the other 51 being for the North Island. A further seven seats are specifically for the Māori population with this number determined by the size of the Māori electoral roll.

Voters are each entitled to two votes, one for their local electorate contest, and one for the nationwide party vote. The remaining 48 seats are allocated from party lists on a proportional basis, based on the nationwide party vote tally. Occasionally, as in the 48th Parliament, this results in an "overhang" - a 121st seat being required to accommodate the correct proportion of Members of Parliament. Only parties which record either 5% of the nationwide party vote or win one or more electoral seats may be awarded list seats.

The size of New Zealand electorates is determined on a population basis such that all electorates have approximately the same population.

== Norway ==
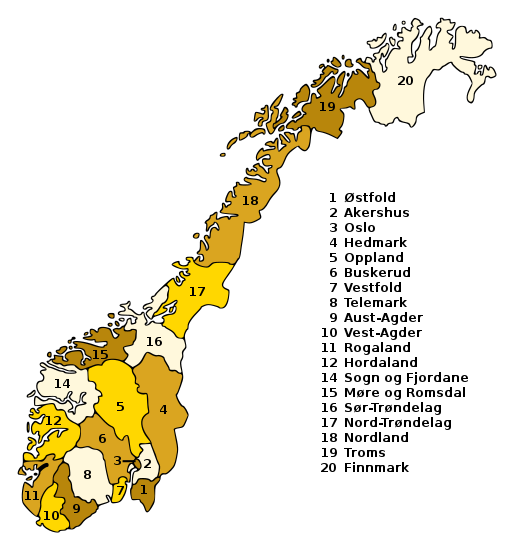
Electoral districts of Norway

Norway is divided into 19 constituencies for parliamentary elections that correspond to traditional areas and counties. For parliamentary elections, 150 representatives are elected, divided into these, as well as one leveling seat from each constituency. Until the Solberg government's regional reform, there was agreement between constituencies and the county division, but after the reform, the county area deviates from the constituencies. In 2020, the Electoral Law Committee has advocated retaining the current 19 constituencies.

The number of seats elected to the Storting from each constituency is determined every eight years based on the population and the number of square kilometers multiplied by 1.8. St. Laguë's modified method is then used to distribute the seats between the constituencies.

In municipal elections the entire municipality is a constituency, with its own election committee, and representatives are elected in list elections with a partially open list .

Elections to the Church of Norway use the congregations as a constituency.

== Philippines ==
The Philippines has a bicameral legislature: the Senate and the House of Representatives. The senators are elected nationwide at-large as one "district," with the twelve candidates with the most votes winning the twelve seats contested every election.

In the House of Representatives, four-fifths of its members are elected via first past the post in single member districts, while the remaining one-fifth is elected via a party-list system nationwide. There are currently 243 congressional districts in the country, each electing one congressman to the House of Representatives. Each province is automatically entitled to one legislative district.

If a province or city is divided into congressional districts, its representation in either its Sangguniang Panlalawigan (provincial board) or Sangguniang Panlungsod (city council) is almost always coterminous with its congressional districts. If a province is composed of a single congressional district, the Commission on Elections divides it into two districts for purposes of elections to the provincial board. If a city just has one congressional district, it depends on its charter if there will be districts for its city council; if it doesn't provide for that, the council is elected at an at-large basis. All municipalities (except Pateros, which is divided into two districts) and barangays (villages) for purposes of electing members to the Sangguniang Bayan (municipal council), Sangguniang Barangay (village council) and Sangguniang Kabataan (youth council) are not divided into districts. All local legislatures are multi-member districts elected via plurality-at-large voting.

From 1916 to 1935, senators were also elected via districts, with eleven districts electing two senators, while the two senators in the twelfth district were appointed by the American governor-general.

While most legislators are elected via geographical districts, they represent their constituents; party-list representatives' constituents is the sector they represent, while the senators' constituency is the entire nation.

== Poland ==
Electoral districts of Poland (Polish: okręg wyborczy) are defined by Polish election law. Electoral districts can be divided depending on whether they are individual entities or parts of a larger electoral district with regard to elections to 1) parliament (Sejm) and Senate 2) local offices and 3) European Parliament. Each district has a number of mandates calculated on the basis of its population.

== Portugal ==
The 22 constituencies of Portugal are named círculos eleitoriais (singular: círculo eleitoral, meaning "electoral circle"). They are used for the election of the deputies of the Portuguese unicameral national parliament, the Assembleia da República (Assembly of the Republic).

Each círculo eleitoral elects a number of deputies (from two to 47), that varies according with the number of electors of the constituency.

The area of 20 of the constituencies coincides with the first level administrative divisions of Portugal, which are the 18 districts of the mainland Portugal and the two autonomous regions of the Portuguese islands. The two remainder constituencies represent the Portuguese who live in foreign countries, existing one círculo eleitoral for Europe and other for outside Europe.

== Russia ==
Constituencies are used for elections to the State Duma.

== Singapore ==
In Singapore, there are 18 group representation constituencies (GRC) and 15 single-member constituencies, giving a total of 33 constituencies. Group representation constituencies elect either four or five MPs to the Parliament of Singapore, while single member constituencies elect one MP. Both GRCs and SMCs are elected via first-past-the-post.

== Spain ==
In Spain, electoral constituencies are known as circunscripciones. Under Article 68 of the Spanish constitution the boundaries must be the same as the provinces of Spain and under Article 141 this can only be altered with the approval of Congress. Voting is on the basis of universal suffrage in a secret ballot. Article 68 also states that the number of deputies must not be less than 300 nor exceed 400, that the enclaves of Ceuta and Melilla should be single member districts, that provinces should be guaranteed an initial minimum representation and that the electoral system should be proportional representation, although it does not specify a particular type.

Constituency magnitude has normally been small. Currently 27 of the 52 districts elect between three and five members. A further ten elect six or seven members. This has tended to favour the larger parties at the expense of smaller lists. Consequently, it has been common for smaller parties to form ad hoc alliances with larger parties by forming joint lists. The electoral system used is closed list proportional representation with seats allocated using the D'Hondt method. Only lists which poll 3% or more of all valid votes cast, including votes "en blanco" i.e. for "none of the above" can be considered for seats. In practice the 3% threshold has usually been unnecessary as the effective representation threshold has been much higher. The sole exception was the 1993 election in Madrid where a minor party list lost a seat.

== Sri Lanka ==
Members of the Sri Lankan Parliament are elected from 22 multi-member electoral districts.

== Sweden ==
In elections to the Swedish Parliament (Riksdag), the 349 seats are divided into 310 fixed seats and 39 adjustment seats. The 310 fixed seats are distributed into 29 multi-member constituencies (valkretsar). These follow county borders with the exception of the three largest counties, Stockholm, Västra Götaland and Skåne, which are divided into two, five and four districts respectively. Counties are also divided into several districts for elections to the county councils, while municipalities above a certain size must be divided into several districts for the purpose of elections to the municipal assemblies.

== Switzerland ==
In Switzerland, the Canton of St. Gallen uses the Wahlkreise (constituency or electoral district) in place of the previous, and more usual, district. See Canton of St. Gallen § Constituencies and municipalities.

== Taiwan ==
As of 2016, there are 73 legislative districts in Taiwan, each with a representative in parliament elected by first-past-the-post. An additional 34 and 6 seats are elected by proportional voting and single non-transferable vote respectively, with a total of 113 seats.

== Tonga ==
There are 17 constituencies for elections to the Legislative Assembly of Tonga.

== Turkey ==
There are 600 seats elected from 87 electoral districts in Turkey to the Grand National Assembly. The districts generally correspond to Turkey's provincial divisions with the exception of Istanbul, Ankara, Izmir and Bursa, which are divided into smaller districts owing to their large electorates.

Voting last took place nationally across all of the below districts on 24 June 2018.

== United Kingdom ==
In the United Kingdom, a parliamentary constituency is sometimes called a parliamentary seat or division. Constituencies for local government elections are called either wards or electoral divisions.

As of 2020, there are 650 House of Commons constituencies in the UK:

- Constituencies of the Parliament of the United Kingdom
- List of MPs elected in the 2024 United Kingdom general election lists the constituencies after that election.

Northern Ireland has 18 constituencies, each of which elect five MLAs to the Northern Ireland Assembly under the Single Transferable Vote system.

The Scottish Parliament has 73 single-member constituencies elected on a first past the post basis, with the remaining 56 seats in the parliament being selected by the Additional Member System (AMS). Since the passage of the Scottish Parliament (Constituencies) Act 2004, the constituencies of the Scottish Parliament are no longer identical to those of the House of Commons.

The Senedd (the Welsh Parliament) has 40 constituencies elected by first past the post which are identical to the Welsh constituencies of the House of Commons. Its remaining 20 seats are selected by AMS.

The London Assembly has 14 constituencies elected by first past the post, described in the article on London Assembly constituencies. Its remaining 11 seats are also selected by AMS.

== United States ==
In the United States, electoral districts for the federal House of Representatives are known as congressional districts (of which there are presently 435; the number can be changed but has remained at 435 since 1912, except for a brief period from 1959 to 1962 when two seats were temporarily added for the then-new States of Alaska and Hawaii), while the electoral districts for the variously named state legislatures go by a variety of names (and have differing numbers). Long standing practice, reinforced and modified by several U.S. Supreme Court decisions, require the equalization of populations of electoral districts after each decennial census, a process known as redistricting.

Electoral districts within the U.S. are subdivided into individual units known as precincts.

=== States ===
- List of Arizona legislative districts
- California State Assembly districts
- List of Georgia House of Representatives districts
- List of Georgia State Senate districts
- List of former districts of the Massachusetts House of Representatives
- List of former districts of the Massachusetts Senate
- List of South Dakota legislative districts
- Vermont House of Representatives districts
- Washington legislative districts
- List of West Virginia Senate districts
- List of Wyoming House of Representatives districts
- List of Wyoming Senate districts

== Vietnam ==
In Vietnam the number of electoral divisions varies from election to election. The most recent parliamentary election in 2011 had 183 electoral divisions which elected 500 delegates of the National Assembly of Vietnam. As the National Assembly of Vietnam is unicameral, the delegates are elected based on the population of that area.

== Zambia ==
156 members of the National Assembly of Zambia are elected by the first-past-the-post system in single-member constituencies.

== Zimbabwe ==
210 members of the National Assembly are elected in single-member constituencies.

== See also ==
- List of political systems
