= Kergu Nature Reserve =

Nature reserve in Estonia

- Location within Estonia
- Location: Estonia
- Coordinates: 58°39′N 24°48′E
- Area: 437 ha (1,080 acres)
- Established: 2007

Kergu Nature Reserve is a nature reserve which is located in Pärnu County, Estonia.

The area of the nature reserve is 437 ha.

The protected area was founded in 2007 to protect valuable habitat types and threatened species in Metsaküla and Sohlu village (both in former Kaisma Parish) and in Viluvere village (Vändra Parish).
