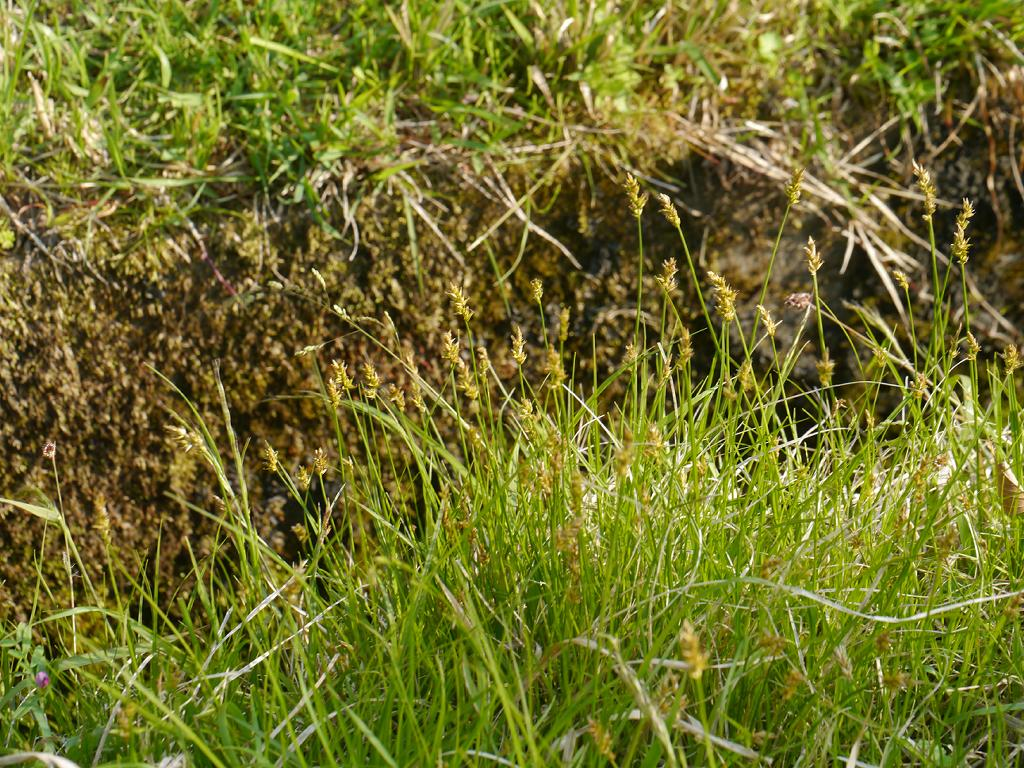

Scientific classification
- Kingdom: Plantae
- Clade: Tracheophytes
- Clade: Angiosperms
- Clade: Monocots
- Clade: Commelinids
- Order: Poales
- Family: Cyperaceae
- Genus: Carex
- Species: C. arenicola

Binomial name
- Carex arenicola F.Schmidt

= Carex arenicola =

Species of grass-like plant

Carex arenicola is a species of sedge first described by Friedrich Schmidt. It is native to eastern Russia and China, the Korean Peninsula, and Japan.
