= Eametsa =

Eametsa may refer to several places in Estonia:

- Eametsa, Põhja-Pärnumaa Parish, village in Põhja-Pärnumaa Parish, Pärnu County
- Eametsa, Tori Parish, village in Tori Parish, Pärnu County
