= Kuninga =

Kuninga may refer to several places in Estonia:

- Kuninga, Pärnu County, village in Põhja-Pärnumaa Parish, Pärnu County
- Kuninga, Viljandi County, village in Põhja-Sakala Parish, Viljandi County
