= Kaisma =

Village in Estonia

- Village
- Location in Estonia
- Coordinates: 58°41′17″N 24°46′35″E
- Country: Estonia
- County: Pärnu County
- Municipality: Põhja-Pärnumaa Parish
- First mentioned: 1530

Population (2011 Census)
  - Total: 116

Kaisma is a village in Põhja-Pärnumaa Parish, Pärnu County, Estonia. It is located about 11 km (7 mi) north of Tootsi, 12 km (7 mi) south of Järvakandi, 15 km (9 mi) west of Vändra and 19 km (12 mi) east of Pärnu-Jaagupi boroughs. Kaisma has conglutinated with the neighbouring Kergu village. The nearest railway stations are in Kõnnu (6 km (4 mi)) and Viluvere (7 km (4 mi)).

As of the 2011 Census, the settlement's population was 116.

Kaisma was first mentioned as Caysma in 1530. Kaisma Manor had existed already in 1601. The main building and distillery were destroyed during the Revolution of 1905. Geologist and botanist Carl Friedrich Schmidt (1832–1908) was born in the manor.

Between 1991 and 2009, Kaisma was the administrative centre of Kaisma Parish, before it was merged into Vändra Parish. In 2017, Vändra Parish was merged into newly established Põhja-Pärnumaa Parish.

== Gallery ==
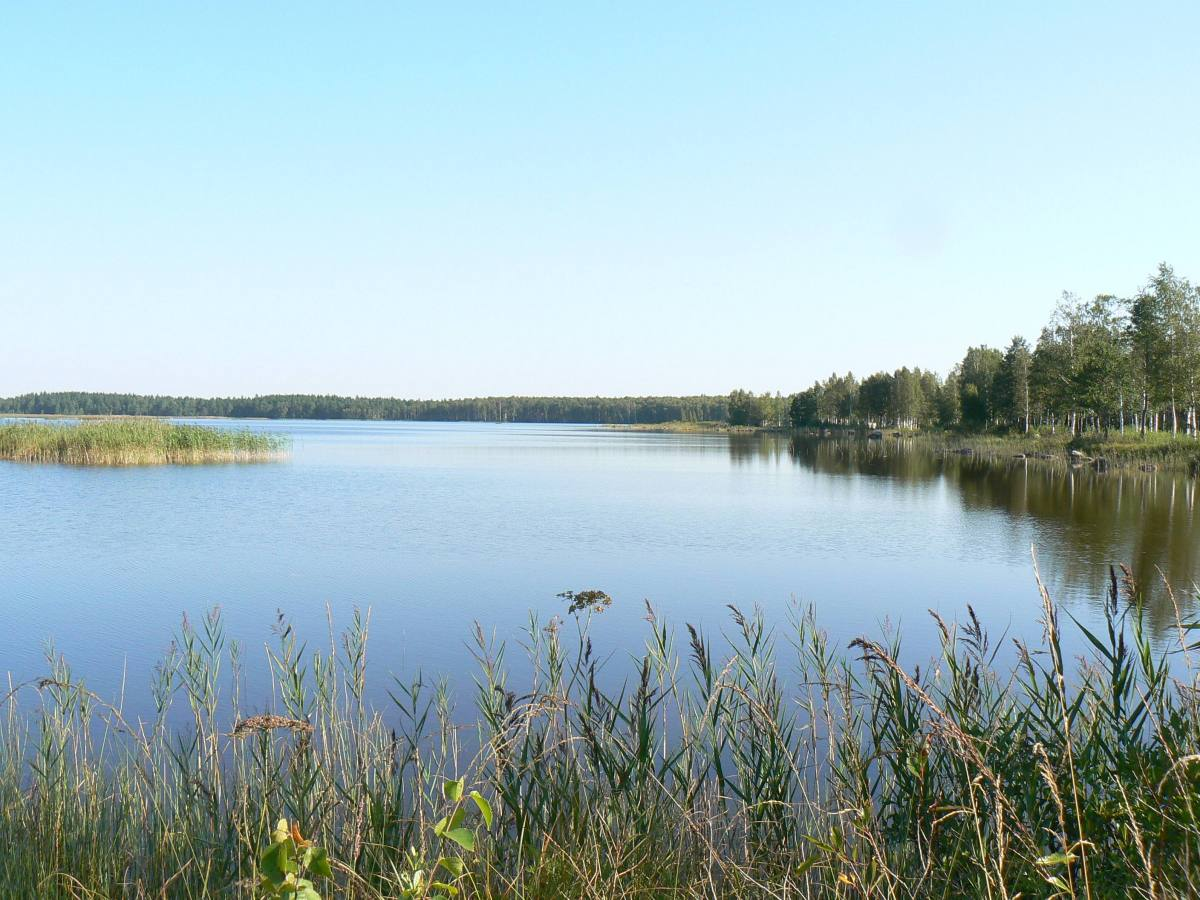
Lake Kaisma
