= Volli Kalm =

Estonian geologist

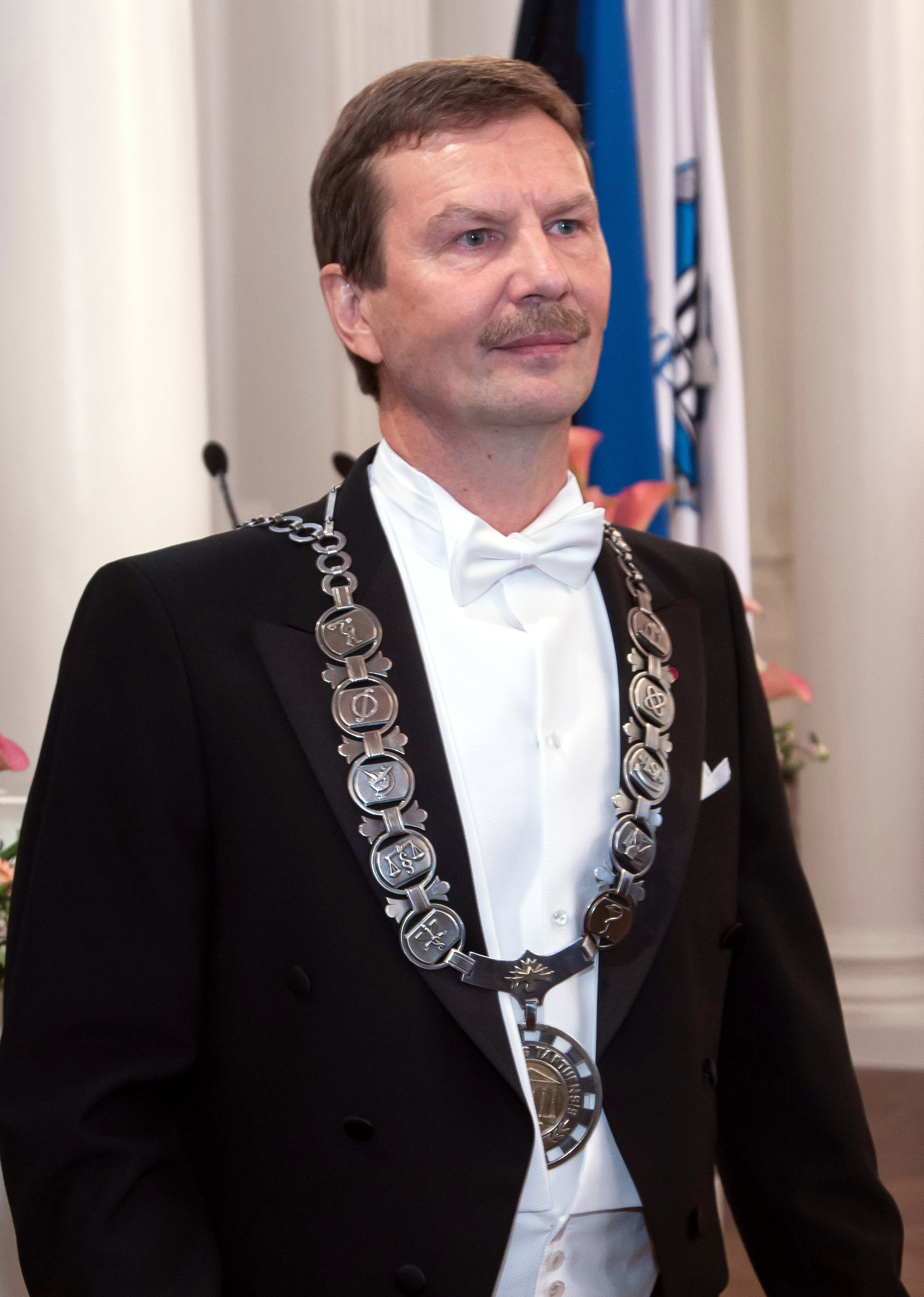
University of Tartu rector Volli Kalm at the inauguration of their assembly hall on 31 August 2012

Volli Kalm (10 February 1953 in Aluste – 23 December 2017 in Kääriku) was an Estonian geologist who, from 1 July 2012 to his death on 23 December 2017, was the rector of the University of Tartu.

== Education and academic degrees ==
Kalm graduated from Vändra Secondary School in 1971 and began studying geology at the University of Tartu, graduating in 1976. From 1980 to 1984, he was a graduate student at the Institute of Geology at the Estonian Academy of Sciences, defending his degree in geology with a dissertation "Formation, composition and use of glaciofluvial deposits in Estonia" (his supervisor was Anto Raukas) in 1984. Between 1988 and 1989, he was a postdoctoral student at the Department of Geology at the University of Alberta.

== Career ==
Kalm had worked since 1981 in the Institute of Geology at the Faculty of Biology and Geography of the University of Tartu (since 2008 at the Institute of Ecology and Earth Sciences at the Faculty of Science and Technology), first as an assistant, from 1986 to 1988 as a lecturer, from 1988 to 1992 as a docent, and, from 1992 until his appointment as rector, as a professor of applied geology.

From 1998 to 2003, he was the Vice-Rector for the University of Tartu.

In 2007, he applied twice to be the rector of the university; the first time in 2007 was a failure, losing the position to Alar Karis who was ahead of him in other elections. Kalm was chosen rector of the University of Tartu on 31 May 2012, ahead of Mart Ustav and Toivo Maimets.

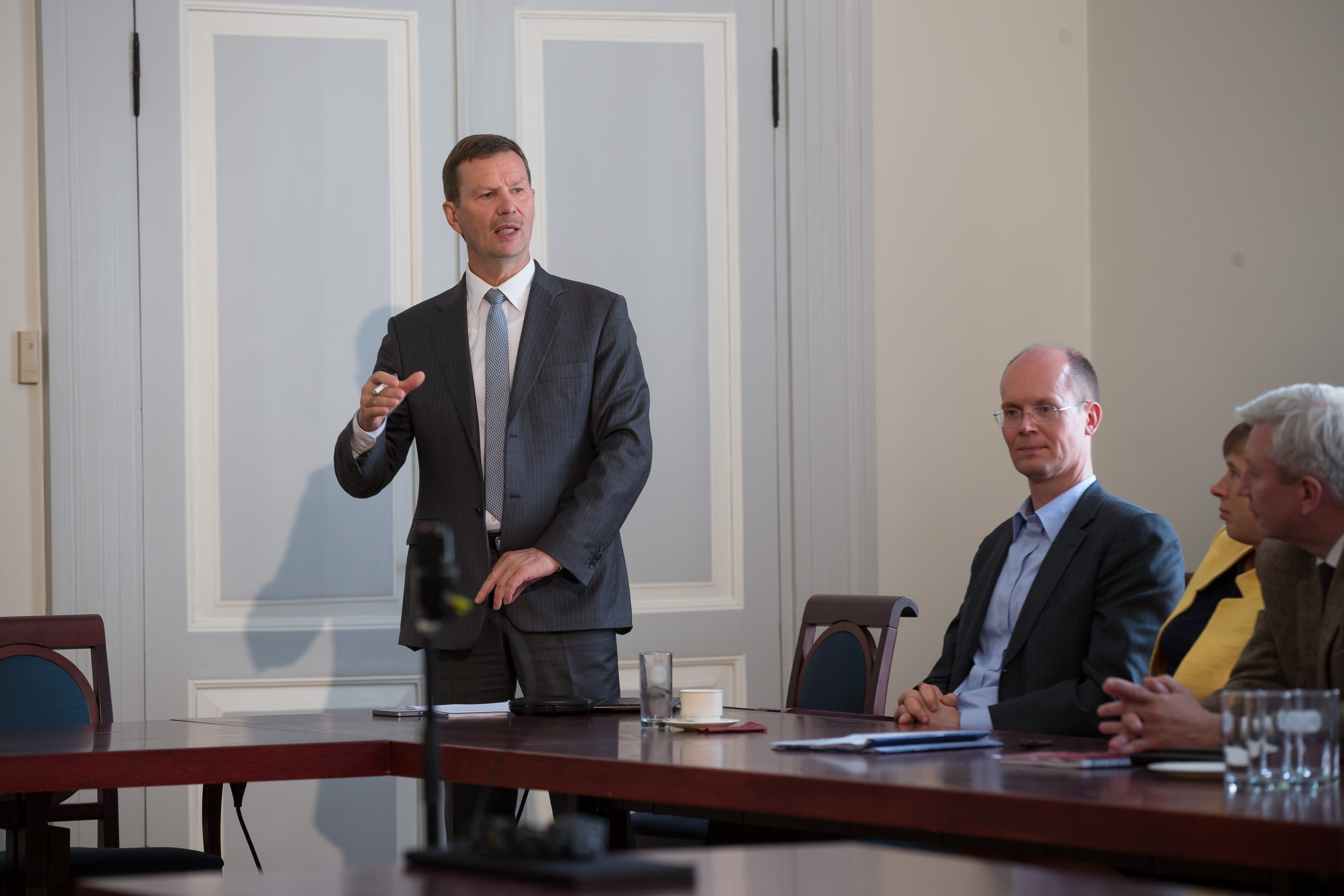
Kalm discussing the topic of the 2015 University of Tartu Council discussion seminar

== Research ==
Kalm has published studies on the mineralogy of lithology and stratigraphy, clay and archaeological ceramics in Estonia and the paleogeography of the Baltic, Scandinavian and Andean glaciers.

== Awards ==
- 2005: 4th Class of the Order of the White Star (received 23 February 2005)
