= Kurgja =

Village in Estonia

- Village
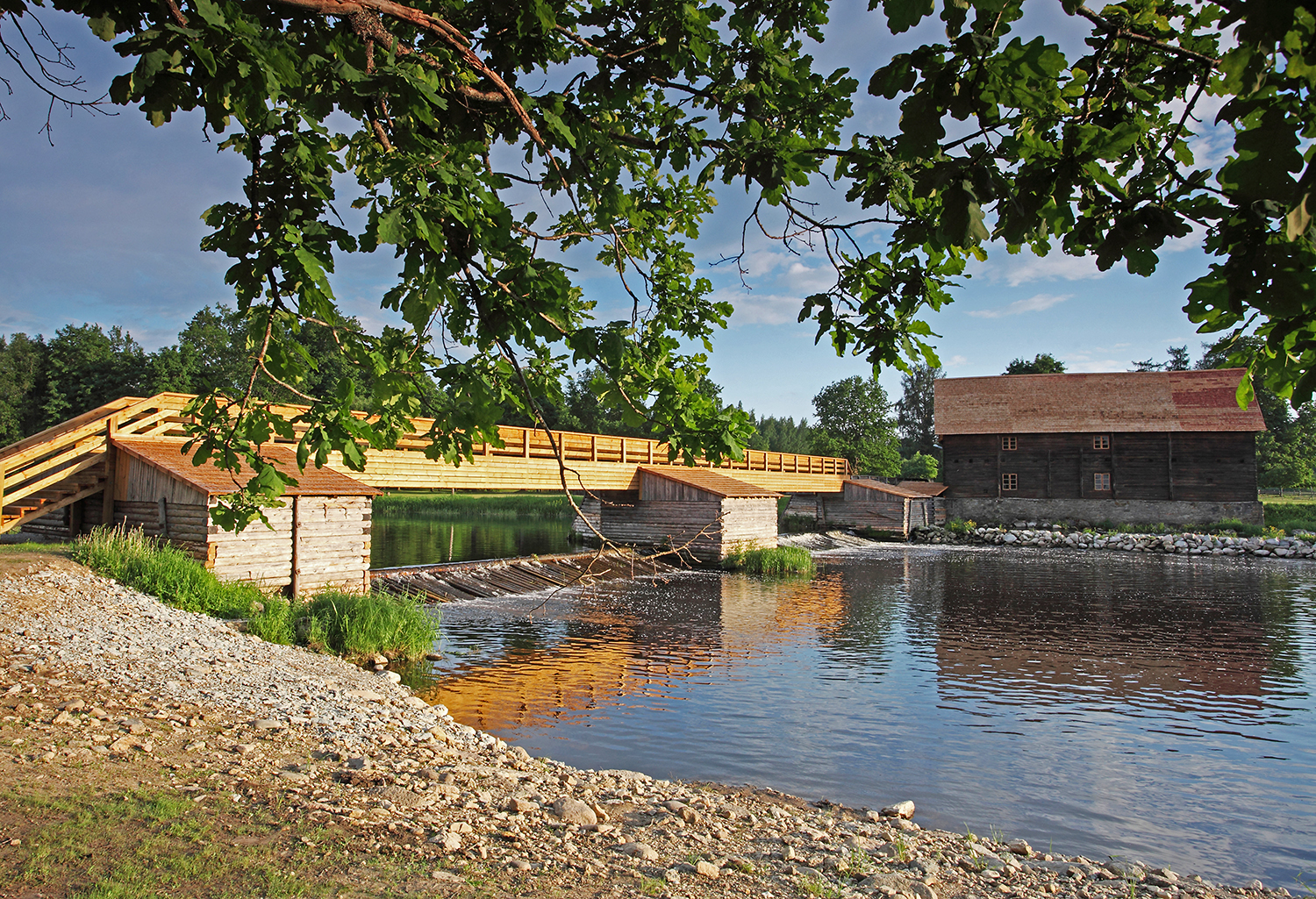
- Wooden bridge over the Pärnu River
- Interactive map of Kurgja
- Country: Estonia
- County: Pärnu County
- Parish: Põhja-Pärnumaa Parish
- Time zone: UTC+2 (EET)
  - Summer (DST): UTC+3 (EEST)

Kurgja is a village in Põhja-Pärnumaa Parish, Pärnu County, in western-central Estonia. It has a population of 10 according to the 2021 census, following a decline from a population of 34 in the 2000 census. Prior to the 2017 administrative reform of Estonian local governments, the village was part of Vändra Parish.
