= Juhan Narma =

Estonian politician (1888–1942)

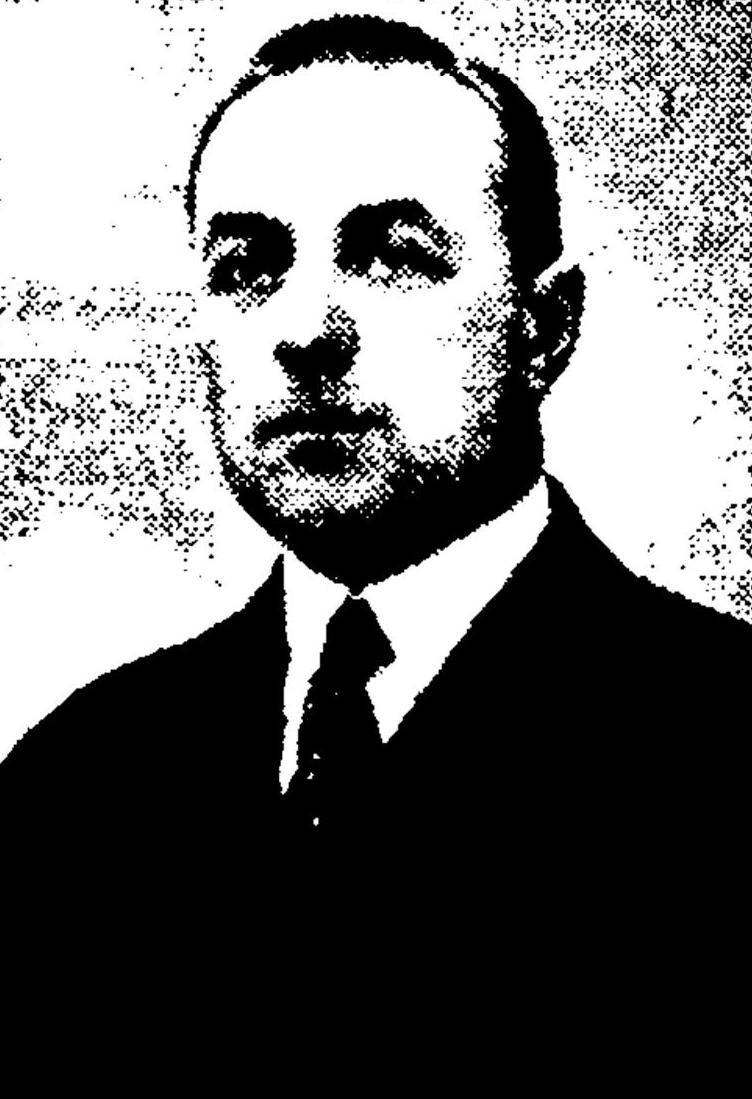
Juhan Narma.

Juhan Narma (until 29 July 1940 Nihtig or Nichtig; 26 October 1888 in Aluste, Kreis Pernau, Governorate of Livonia – 19 October 1942 in Tavda, Sverdlovsk Oblast, Russian SFSR) was an Estonian politician.

== Biography ==
Nihtig was born on Vainussaare farm near Aluste. He was among the founders of the Central Cooperative of Estonian Consumers (ETK) in 1917, and would serve as a member of the board of the ETK until 1935. He was also a member of the Estonian-Soviet Chamber of Commerce and of the Patriotic League, the only legal political party in Estonia from 1935. After leaving his positions in the ETK, he served as editor of the newspaper Uus Eesti in 1935–1940.

On 21 June 1940, Nihtig was appointed Minister of Economic Affairs in Johannes Vares' cabinet after the occupation of the Baltic States by the Soviet Union. He held this position until the cabinet was replaced by the Council of People's Commissars of the Estonian SSR on 25 August 1940.

Nihtig was arrested by the NKVD on 14 June 1941, after his former membership of the Patriotic League was discovered. In June 1942 he was sentenced to five years in prison. He died in a prison in Tavda in October of that year.

Year	Event
1888	Born at Vainussaare Farm, Aluste, Vändra Parish.
1907	Entered the cooperative movement at Vändra.
1912	Manager of Paide Consumers' Cooperative "Iva".
1917	Founder and business manager of the Estonian Consumers' Cooperative Association.
1919	Association reorganized as ETK.
1924	Became Chairman of the ETK Board.
1924–1930	Led ETK during major national expansion.
1929	Appointed Honorary Consul of Chile.
1935	Became business director of Uus Eesti.
1940	Minister of Economic Affairs.
1940	Changed surname from Nihtig to Narma.
1941	Arrested by the NKVD during the June deportations.
1942	Died in Tavda Prison.
