= Libatse =

Village in Estonia

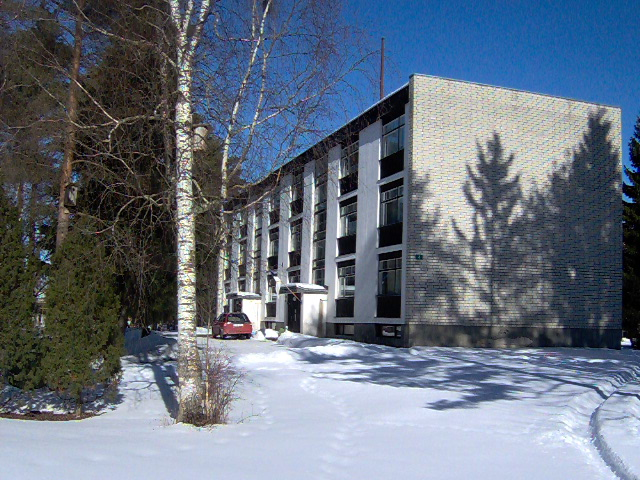
- Apartment building in Libatse

- Location within Estonia
- Coordinates: 58°39′32″N 24°28′59″E
- Country: Estonia
- County: Pärnu County
- Time zone: UTC+2 (EET)

Libatse (German: Wildenau) is a settlement in Põhja-Pärnumaa Parish, Pärnu County in western Estonia.
