= Rätsepa, Põhja-Pärnumaa Parish =

Village in Estonia

Coordinates: 58°38′19″N 25°01′32″E

Rätsepa
- Village
- Interactive map of Rätsepa
- Country: Estonia
- County: Pärnu County
- Parish: Põhja-Pärnumaa Parish
- Time zone: UTC+2 (EET)
  - Summer (DST): UTC+3 (EEST)

Rätsepa is a village in Põhja-Pärnumaa Parish, Pärnu County, Estonia, on the southern outskirts of the borough of Vändra.
