= Tagassaare =

Village in Estonia

Coordinates: 58°38′N 25°12′E

- Village
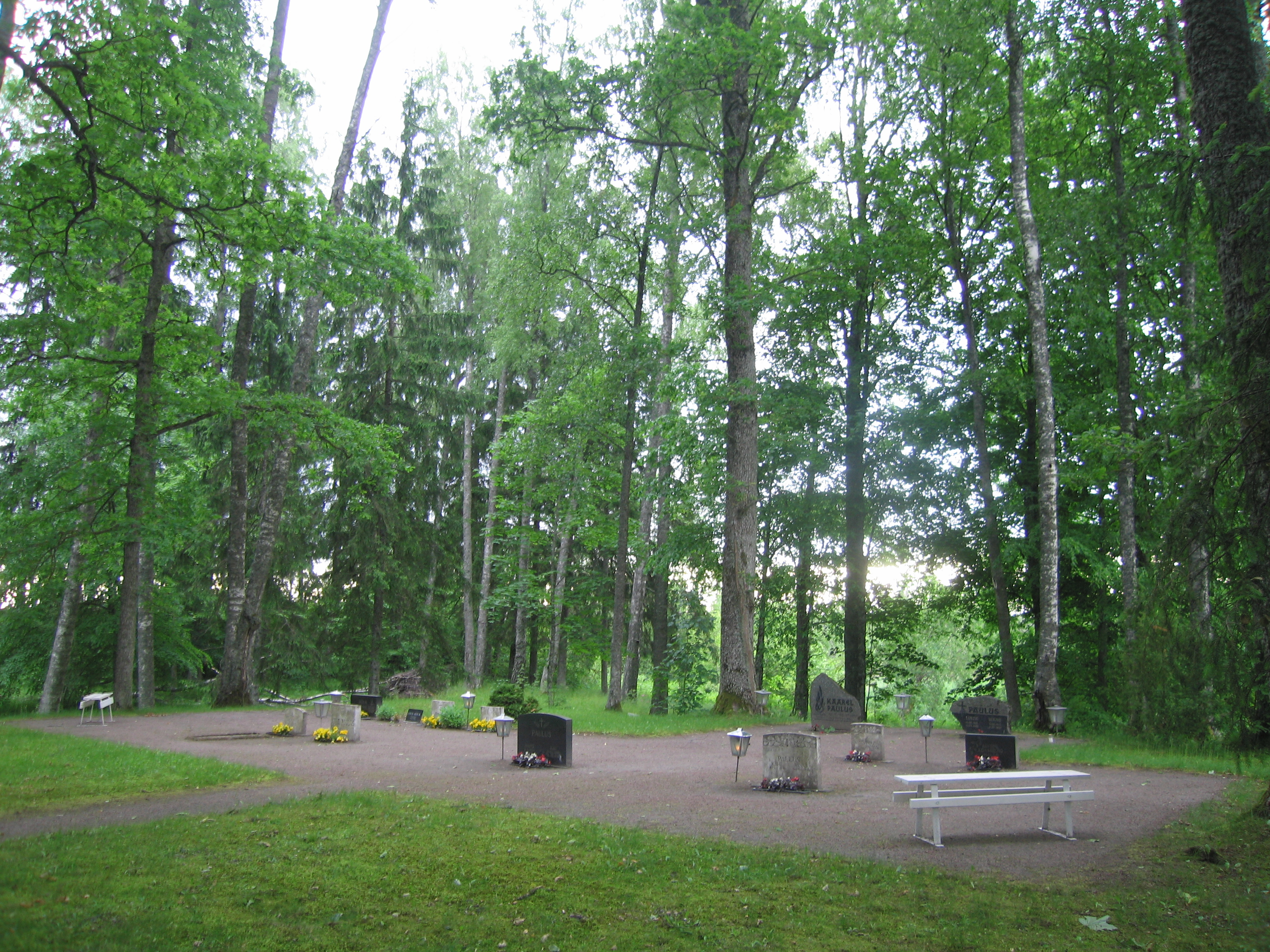
- Hauamäe Farm Cemetery in Tagassaare
- Interactive map of Tagassaare
- Country: Estonia
- County: Pärnu County
- Parish: Põhja-Pärnumaa Parish
- Time zone: UTC+2 (EET)
  - Summer (DST): UTC+3 (EEST)

Tagassaare is a village in Põhja-Pärnumaa Parish, Pärnu County in western-central Estonia.
