= Altküla, Pärnu County =

Village in Estonia

Altküla
- Village
- Location within Estonia
- Coordinates: 58°42′01″N 24°30′18″E
- Country: Estonia
- County: Pärnu County
- Parish: Põhja-Pärnumaa Parish
- Time zone: UTC+2 (EET)
  - Summer (DST): UTC+3 (EEST)

Altküla is a village in Põhja-Pärnumaa Parish, Pärnu County in southwestern Estonia.
