= Massu, Põhja-Pärnumaa Parish =

Village in Estonia

Coordinates: 58°37′47″N 23°57′42″E

Massu
- Village
- Interactive map of Massu
- Country: Estonia
- County: Pärnu County
- Parish: Põhja-Pärnumaa Parish
- Time zone: UTC+2 (EET)
  - Summer (DST): UTC+3 (EEST)

Massu is a village in Põhja-Pärnumaa Parish, Pärnu County in western-central Estonia.
