= Vaki =

Village in Estonia

- Village
- Location in Estonia
- Coordinates: 58°38′04″N 24°59′17″E
- Country: Estonia
- County: Pärnu County
- Municipality: Põhja-Pärnumaa Parish

Population (29.09.2010)
  - Total: 129

Vaki is a village in Põhja-Pärnumaa Parish, Pärnu County in southwestern Estonia. It has a population of 129 (as of 29 September 2010).
