= Mädara =

Village in Estonia

Coordinates: 58°40′N 25°12′E

- Village
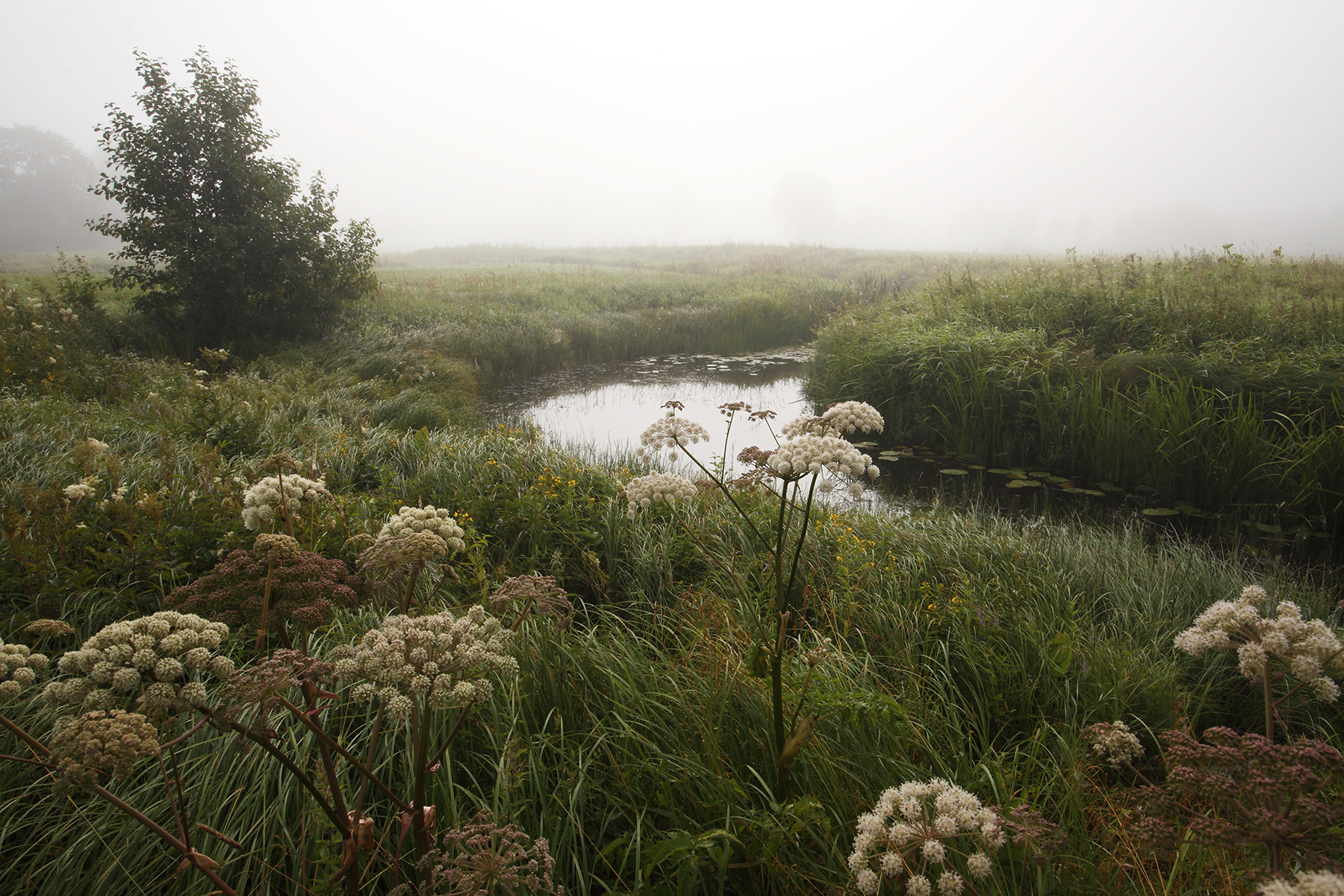
- Mädara river in Mädara village
- Interactive map of Mädara
- Country: Estonia
- County: Pärnu County
- Parish: Põhja-Pärnumaa Parish
- Time zone: UTC+2 (EET)
  - Summer (DST): UTC+3 (EEST)

Mädara is a village in Põhja-Pärnumaa Parish, Pärnu County in western-central Estonia.
