= Yota Arase =

Japanese swimmer (born 1982)

Personal information
- Born: January 19, 1982 (age 44)

Sport
- Sport: Swimming
- Strokes: Freestyle

Yota Arase (荒瀬 洋太, Arase Yōta; born 19 January 1982) is a Japanese former swimmer who competed in the 2000 Summer Olympics in the 1500 m freestyle.
