= Oriküla =

Village in Estonia

- Village
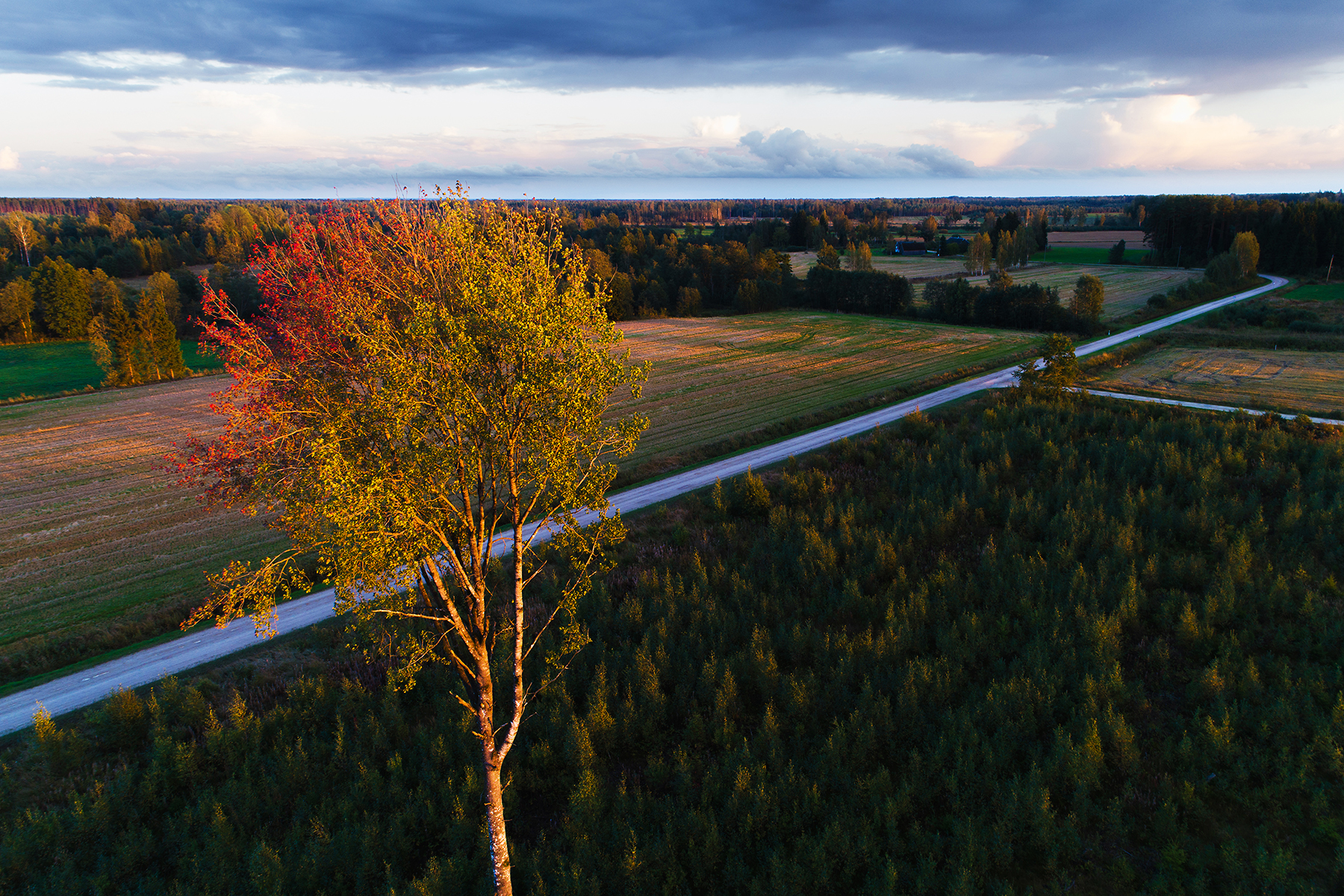
- Road through Oriküla

- Location within Estonia
- Coordinates: 58°39′N 25°12′E
- Country: Estonia
- County: Pärnu County
- Parish: Põhja-Pärnumaa Parish
- Time zone: UTC+2 (EET)
  - Summer (DST): UTC+3 (EEST)

Oriküla is a village in Põhja-Pärnumaa Parish, Pärnu County in western-central Estonia.
