= Võidula =

Village in Estonia

- Village
- Location in Estonia
- Coordinates: 58°42′19″N 25°05′55″E
- Country: Estonia
- County: Pärnu County
- Municipality: Põhja-Pärnumaa Parish

Population (29.09.2010)
  - Total: 70

Võidula (German: Karolinenhof) is a village in Põhja-Pärnumaa Parish, Pärnu County in western-central Estonia. It has a population of 70 (as of 29 September 2010).

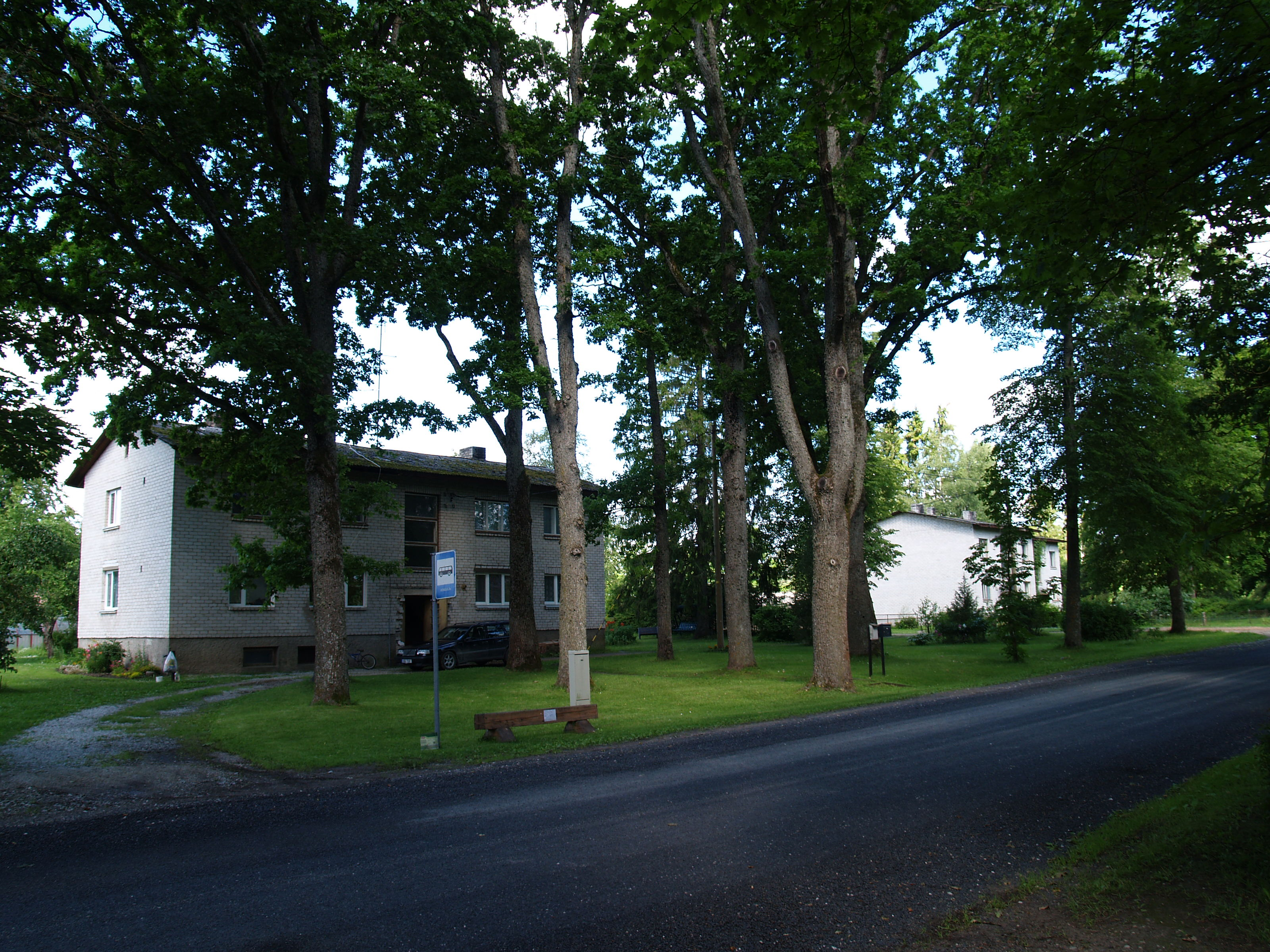
Houses in Võidula

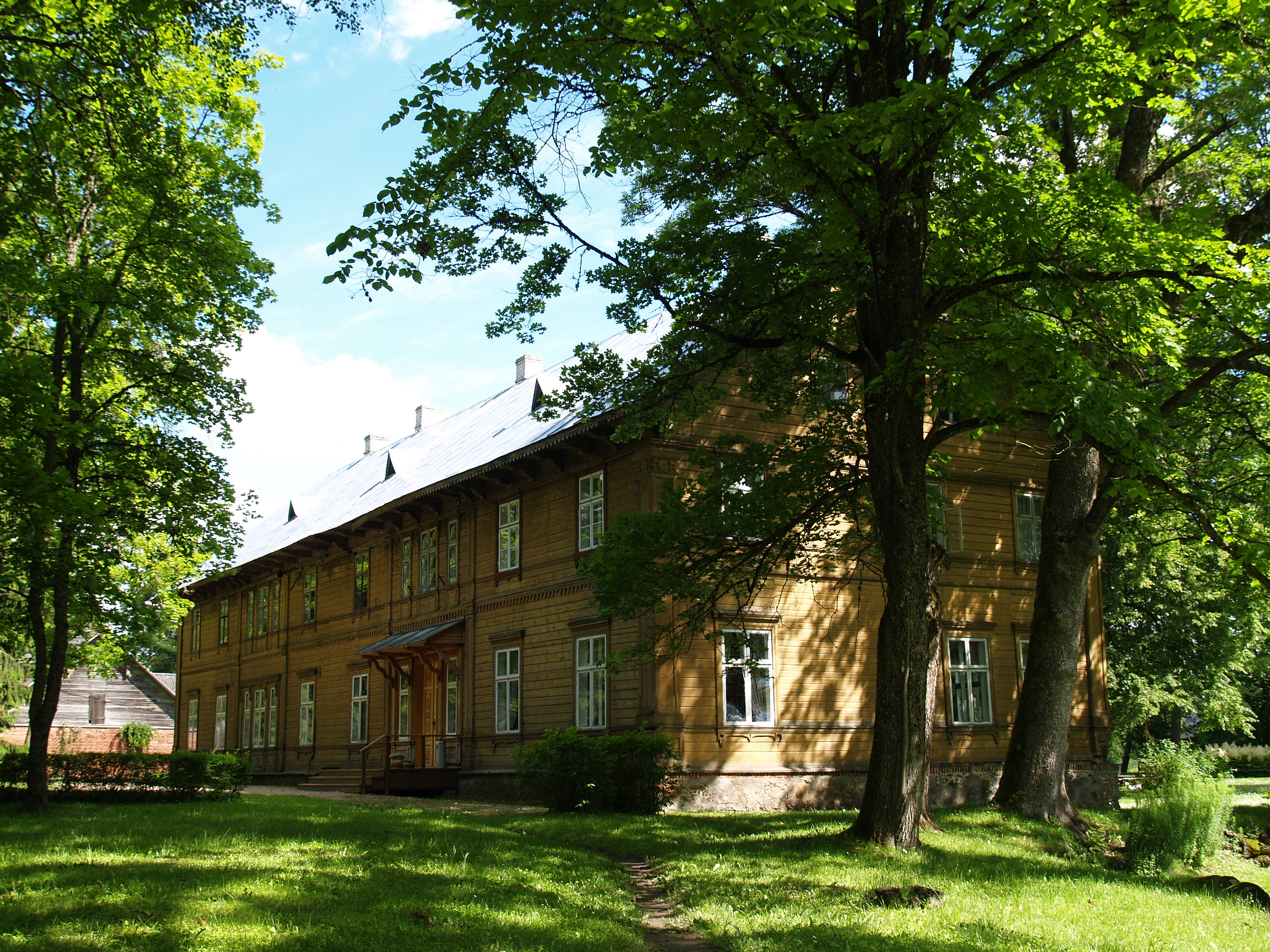
Võidula Manor

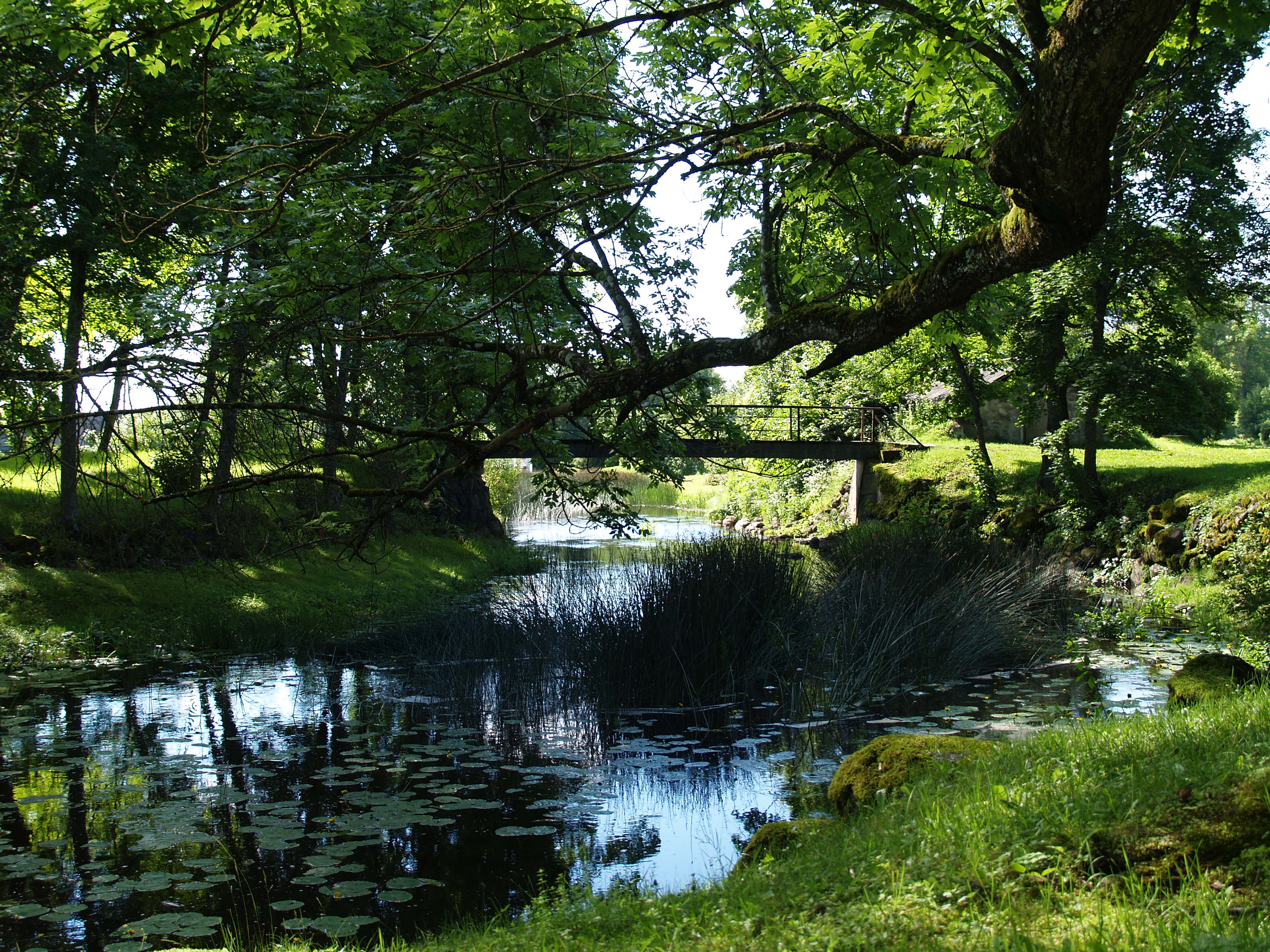
Manor park and Käru river
