= Rõusa =

Village in Estonia

- Village
- Interactive map of Rõusa
- Country: Estonia
- County: Pärnu County
- Parish: Põhja-Pärnumaa Parish
- Time zone: UTC+2 (EET)
  - Summer (DST): UTC+3 (EEST)

Rõusa (German: Karlshof) is a village in Põhja-Pärnumaa Parish, Pärnu County in western-central Estonia. The village is located at coordinates 58°40′N 25°07′E.

Journalist, writer and feminist Lilli Suburg (1841–1923) was born in Rõusa Manor.
