= Veskisoo =

Village in Estonia

Coordinates: 58°35′N 25°08′E

- Village
- Interactive map of Veskisoo
- Country: Estonia
- County: Pärnu County
- Parish: Põhja-Pärnumaa Parish
- Time zone: UTC+2 (EET)
  - Summer (DST): UTC+3 (EEST)

Veskisoo is a village in Põhja-Pärnumaa Parish, Pärnu County in western-central Estonia.
