= Aasa, Estonia =

Village in Estonia

Aasa
- Village
- Location within Estonia
- Country: Estonia
- County: Pärnu County
- Parish: Põhja-Pärnumaa Parish
- Time zone: UTC+2 (EET)
  - Summer (DST): UTC+3 (EEST)

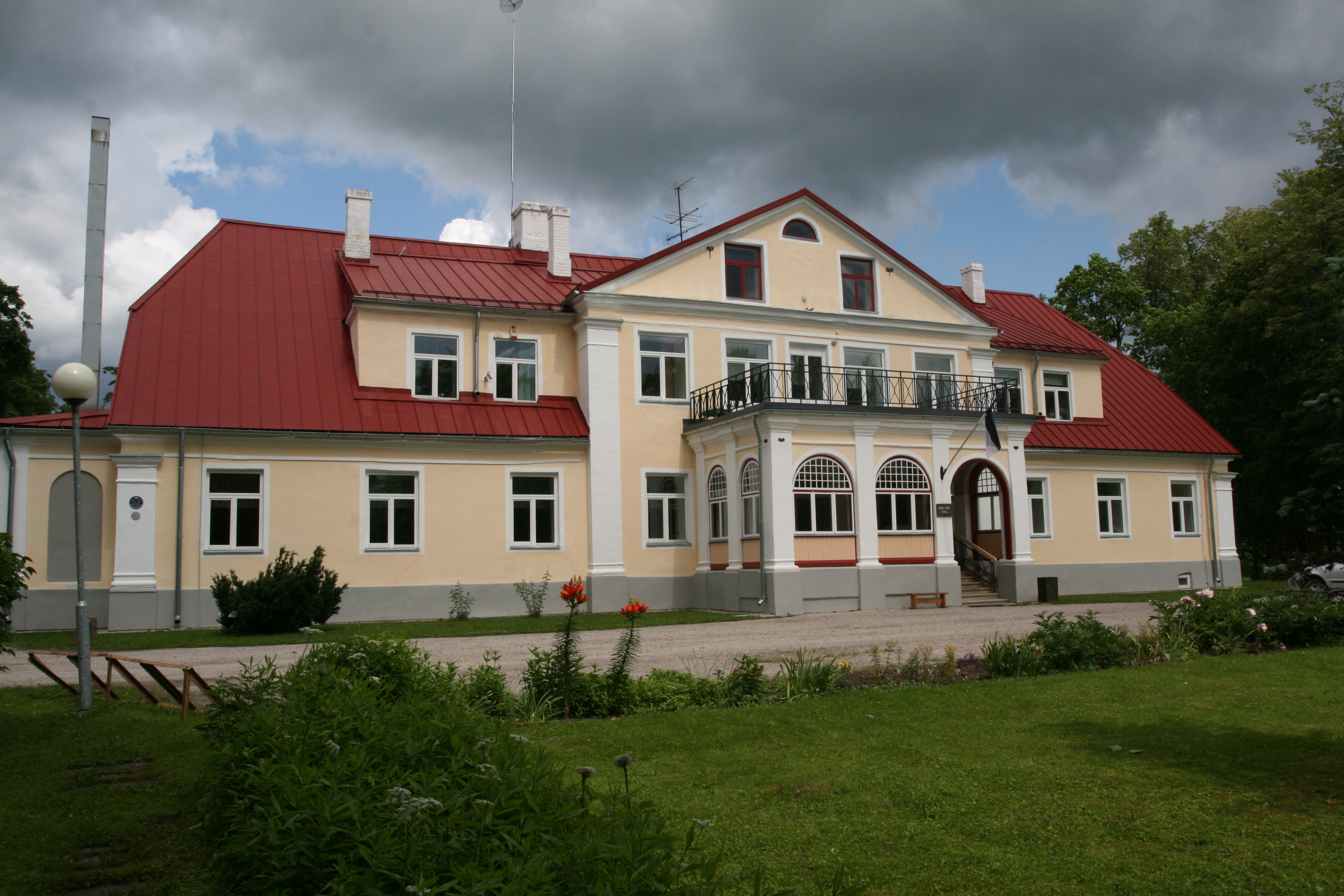
Kaelase Manor

Aasa is a southwestern village in Põhja-Pärnumaa Parish, Pärnu County, Estonia. It is located on the border of the Pärnu and Rapla counties. The village is known for Kaelase mõis, a historical manor founded in 1665.
