= Tōru Arase =

Japanese water polo player (born 1935)

Personal information
- Born: November 5, 1935 (age 89); Kikuchi, Kumamoto, Japan

Sport
- Sport: Water polo

Tōru Arase (荒瀬 徹, Arase Tōru, born 5 November 1935) is a Japanese former water polo player who competed in the 1972 Summer Olympics.
