= Tarva, Põhja-Pärnumaa Parish =

Village in Estonia

Coordinates: 58°34′50″N 24°30′10″E

Tarva
- Village
- Interactive map of Tarva
- Country: Estonia
- County: Pärnu County
- Parish: Põhja-Pärnumaa Parish
- Time zone: UTC+2 (EET)
  - Summer (DST): UTC+3 (EEST)

Tarva is a village in Põhja-Pärnumaa Parish, Pärnu County in southwestern Estonia.
