= Vee, Estonia =

Village in Estonia

Coordinates: 58°37′N 24°19′E

Vee
- Village
- Interactive map of Vee
- Country: Estonia
- County: Pärnu County
- Parish: Põhja-Pärnumaa Parish
- Time zone: UTC+2 (EET)
  - Summer (DST): UTC+3 (EEST)

Vee (German: Wehof) is a village in Põhja-Pärnumaa Parish, Pärnu County in southwestern Estonia.

== Name ==
Vee was attested in historical sources as Wekulle in 1514, Wehe in 1564, Wige in 1601, and Wiohl in 1638. The origin of the name is uncertain. The Finnish linguist Lauri Kettunen tentatively connected the name to the common noun vesi (genitive vee) 'water'.
