= Pööravere =

Village in Estonia

Coordinates: 58°41′N 24°37′E

- Village
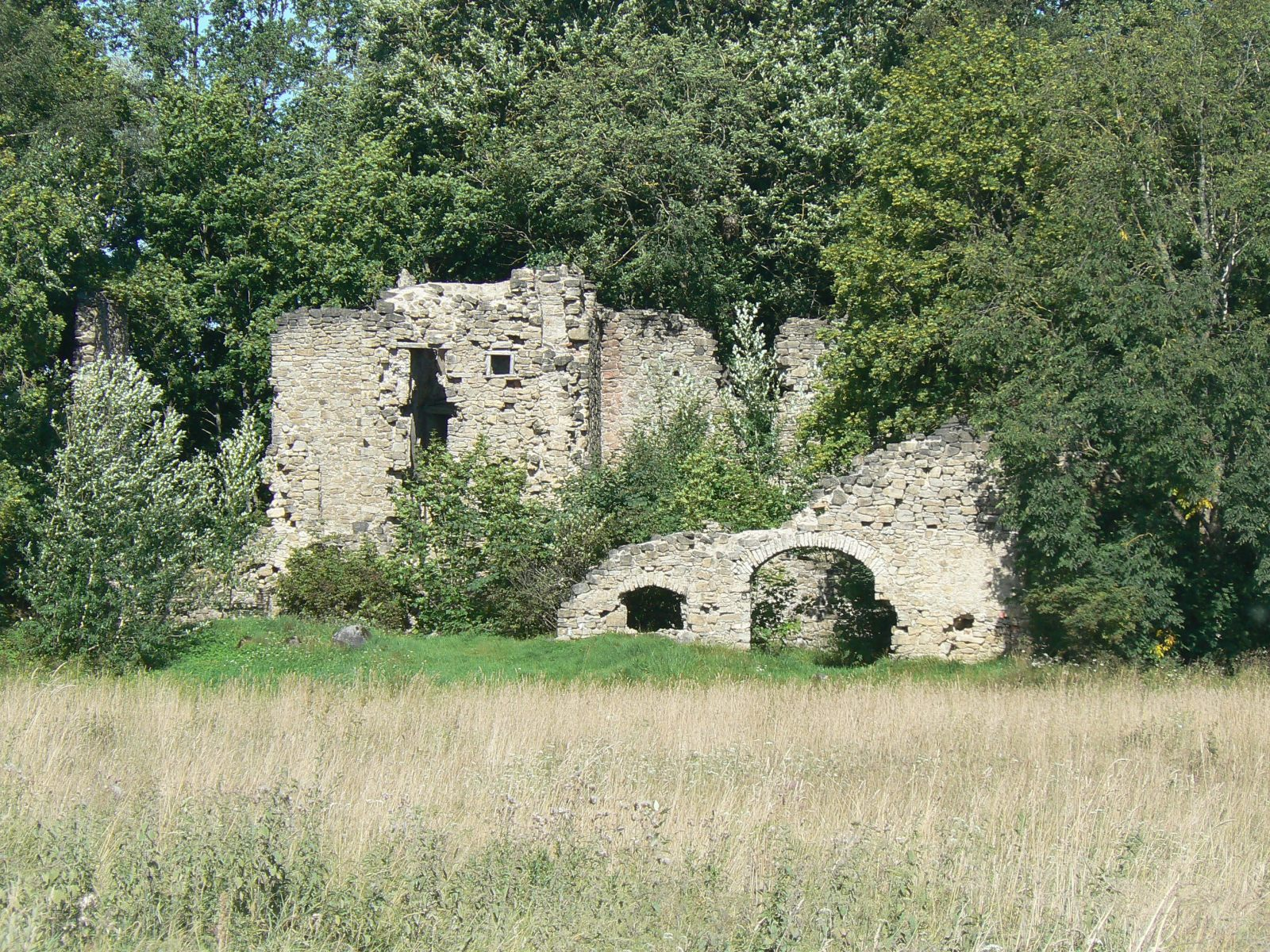
- Ruins of Pööravere distillery
- Interactive map of Pööravere
- Country: Estonia
- County: Pärnu County
- Parish: Põhja-Pärnumaa Parish
- Time zone: UTC+2 (EET)
  - Summer (DST): UTC+3 (EEST)

Pööravere (German: Pörafer) is a village in Põhja-Pärnumaa Parish, Pärnu County in southwestern Estonia.

Zoologist and explorer Alexander von Middendorff (1815–1894) lived in Pööravere Manor.
