= Enge, Estonia =

Village in Estonia

Enge
- Village
- Location within Estonia
- Coordinates: 58°38′33″N 24°33′28″E
- Country: Estonia
- County: Pärnu County
- Parish: Põhja-Pärnumaa Parish
- Time zone: UTC+2 (EET)
  - Summer (DST): UTC+3 (EEST)

Enge is a village in Põhja-Pärnumaa Parish, Pärnu County in southwestern Estonia.

Enge is the birthplace of actor Mart Toome.
