= Rae, Pärnu County =

Village in Estonia

Rae
- Village
- Location in Estonia
- Coordinates: 58°42′31″N 25°16′35″E
- Country: Estonia
- County: Pärnu County
- Municipality: Põhja-Pärnumaa Parish

Population (29.09.2010)
  - Total: 16

Rae is a village in Põhja-Pärnumaa Parish, Pärnu County in western-central Estonia. It has a population of 16 (as of 29 September 2010).
