= Mõisaküla, Põhja-Pärnumaa Parish =

Village in Estonia

Coordinates: 58°37′20″N 24°36′42″E

Mõisaküla, Pärnu County
- Village
- Interactive map of Mõisaküla, Pärnu County
- Country: Estonia
- County: Pärnu County
- Parish: Põhja-Pärnumaa Parish
- Time zone: UTC+2 (EET)
  - Summer (DST): UTC+3 (EEST)

Mõisaküla is a village in Põhja-Pärnumaa Parish, Pärnu County in southwestern Estonia.
