= Kaansoo =

Village in Estonia

- Village
- Location within Estonia
- Coordinates: 58°35′N 25°12′E
- Country: Estonia
- County: Pärnu County
- Parish: Põhja-Pärnumaa Parish
- Time zone: UTC+2 (EET)
  - Summer (DST): UTC+3 (EEST)

Kaansoo is a village in Põhja-Pärnumaa Parish, Pärnu County in western-central Estonia. In 2011, the population of Kaansoo was 108.
