= Kose, Pärnu County =

Village in Estonia

Coordinates: 58°37′59″N 25°05′57″E

Kose
- Village
- Interactive map of Kose
- Country: Estonia
- County: Pärnu County
- Parish: Põhja-Pärnumaa Parish
- Time zone: UTC+2 (EET)
  - Summer (DST): UTC+3 (EEST)

Kose is a village in Põhja-Pärnumaa Parish, Pärnu County in western-central Estonia.
