= Eense =

Village in Estonia

Coordinates: 58°37′N 24°23′E

- Village
- Interactive map of Eense
- Country: Estonia
- County: Pärnu County
- Parish: Põhja-Pärnumaa Parish
- Time zone: UTC+2 (EET)
  - Summer (DST): UTC+3 (EEST)

Eense is a village in Põhja-Pärnumaa Parish, Pärnu County in southwestern Estonia.
