= Kuninga, Pärnu County =

Village in Estonia

Coordinates: 58°37′37″N 24°24′25″E

- Village
- Interactive map of Kuninga, Pärnu County
- Country: Estonia
- County: Pärnu County
- Parish: Põhja-Pärnumaa Parish
- Time zone: UTC+2 (EET)
  - Summer (DST): UTC+3 (EEST)

Kuninga is a village in Põhja-Pärnumaa Parish, Pärnu County in southwestern Estonia.
