= Eametsa, Põhja-Pärnumaa Parish =

Village in Estonia

Eametsa
- Village
- Location within Estonia
- Coordinates: 58°37′00″N 24°39′40″E
- Country: Estonia
- County: Pärnu County
- Parish: Põhja-Pärnumaa Parish
- Time zone: UTC+2 (EET)
  - Summer (DST): UTC+3 (EEST)

Eametsa is a village in Põhja-Pärnumaa Parish, Pärnu County in southwestern Estonia.
