= Arase, Estonia =

Village in Estonia

Arase
- Village
- Location in Estonia
- Coordinates: 58°40′34″N 24°29′00″E
- Country: Estonia
- County: Pärnu County
- Municipality: Põhja-Pärnumaa Parish

Population (01.01.2010)
  - Total: 43

Arase is a village in Põhja-Pärnumaa Parish, Pärnu County in southwestern Estonia. It has a population of 43 (as of 1 January 2010).
