= Rahkama =

Village in Estonia

Coordinates: 58°44′N 24°43′E

- Village
- Interactive map of Rahkama
- Country: Estonia
- County: Pärnu County
- Parish: Põhja-Pärnumaa Parish
- Time zone: UTC+2 (EET)
  - Summer (DST): UTC+3 (EEST)

Rahkama is a village in Põhja-Pärnumaa Parish, Pärnu County in western-central Estonia.
