= Carl Friedrich Schmidt (geologist) =

Baltic German geologist and botanist

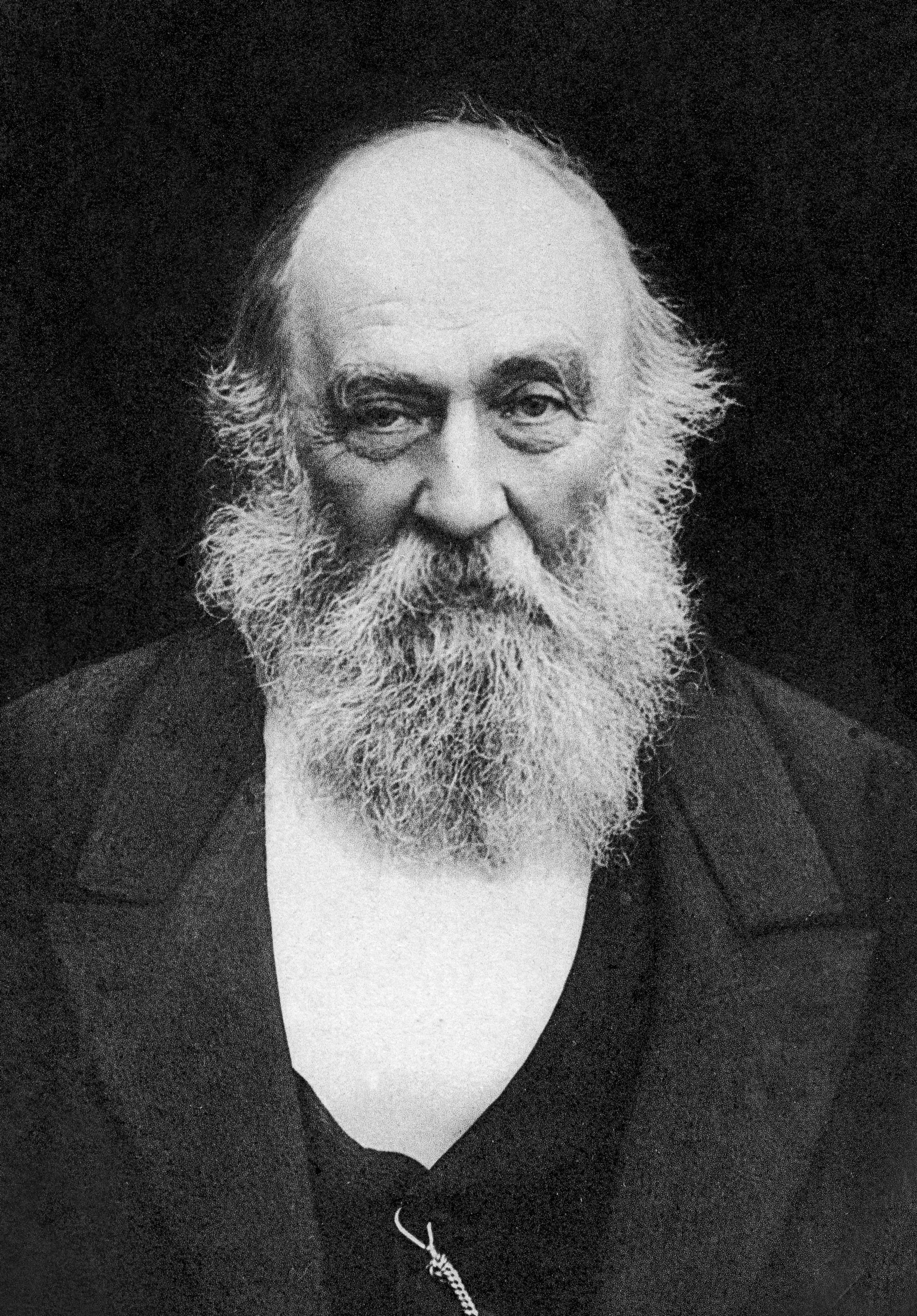
Carl Friedrich Schmidt

Carl Friedrich Schmidt (Russian: Фёдор Богданович Шмидт, Fyodor Bogdanovich Schmidt; also known as Friedrich Schmidt; 27 January [O.S. 15 January] 1832 in Kaisma, Livonia – 21 November [O.S. 8 November] 1908 in Saint Petersburg) was a Baltic German geologist and botanist in the Russian Empire. He is acknowledged as the founder of Estonian geology. In the mid-19th century, he researched Estonian oil shale, kukersite, and named it after Kuckers.

Main papers of Friedrich Schmidt research the stratigraphy and fauna of Lower Palaeozoic rocks in Estonia and the neighboring areas. In 1885 he became academician of St. Petersburg Academy of Sciences. He won the Wollaston Medal, awarded by the Geological Society of London, in 1902.

Friedrich Schmidt was the first European to "discover" the Sakhalin Fir on the Russian island of Sakhalin in 1866, but he did not introduce it to Europe. The Schmidt Peninsula (Sakhalin) was named after him.

== Sources ==
- "Шмидт, Федор Богданович" . Brockhaus and Efron Encyclopedic Dictionary (in Russian). 1906.
