= Kergu =

Village in Estonia

- Village
- Location in Estonia
- Coordinates: 58°40′06″N 24°45′21″E
- Country: Estonia
- County: Pärnu County
- Municipality: Põhja-Pärnumaa Parish

Population (29.09.2010)
  - Total: 197

Kergu (German: Kerkau) is a village in Põhja-Pärnumaa Parish, Pärnu County in western-central Estonia. It has a population of 197 (as of 29 September 2010).
