= Sohlu =

Village in Estonia

Coordinates: 58°40′48″N 24°48′23″E

- Village
- Interactive map of Sohlu
- Country: Estonia
- County: Pärnu County
- Parish: Põhja-Pärnumaa Parish
- Time zone: UTC+2 (EET)
  - Summer (DST): UTC+3 (EEST)

Sohlu is a village in Põhja-Pärnumaa Parish, Pärnu County in western-central Estonia.
