= Metsaküla, Põhja-Pärnumaa Parish =

Village in Estonia

Coordinates: 58°39′12″N 24°45′40″E

Metsaküla
- Village
- Interactive map of Metsaküla
- Country: Estonia
- County: Pärnu County
- Parish: Põhja-Pärnumaa Parish

Area
  - Total: 0.1135 km^{2} (0.0438 sq mi)

Population
  - Total: 5
- Time zone: UTC+2 (EET)
  - Summer (DST): UTC+3 (EEST)

Metsaküla is a village in Põhja-Pärnumaa Parish, Pärnu County in western-central Estonia.
