= 100 krooni =

Estonian banknote

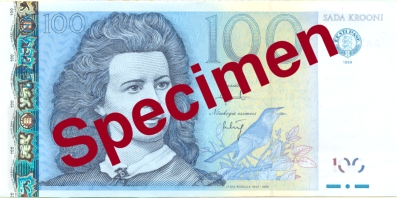
Obverse of the 100 krooni banknote

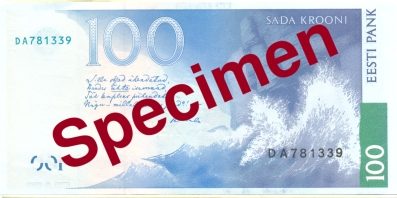
Reverse of the 100 krooni banknote

The 100 krooni banknote (100 EEK) is a denomination of the Estonian kroon, the former currency of Estonia. Lydia Koidula (1843–1886), who was an Estonian poet and playwright, is featured on the front side of the banknote, which is why the 100 krooni banknote is often called a "Koidula".

A view of the north Estonian limestone shore is featured on the reverse side of the banknote. Before the replacement of the kroon by the euro, the 100 krooni banknote was the main everyday currency used by Estonians and was commonly dispensed by ATMs in Estonia as well as used for withdrawals or cashing checks. It can be exchanged indefinitely at the currency museum of Eesti Pank for €6.39.

== History of the banknote ==
- 1991: first series issued by the Bank of Estonia;
- 1992: second series issued;
- 1994: third series issued;
- 1999: fourth series issued;
- 2007: fifth series issued;
- 2011: withdrawn from circulation and replaced by the euro

== Security features ==
- 1991
1. The watermark of the three lions is visible when the note is horizontal, but springs to life when the note is held against the light. The watermark is in two parts on the edges of the note.
2. Each note contains a security thread.
3. The portraits are printed in the main colour of the note and their raised surface can be felt with the fingertips.
4. Each note has an individual serial number. The horizontal number on the left is printed in black and the vertical number on the right is printed in a different colour on each denomination.
5. When the note is held at an angle to the light, the denomination of the note can be seen.
- 1994
1. New colour tints have been used in these areas.
2. Silver ink has been incorporated into the note.
3. A new style serial number appears on the right-hand side, in a different colour for each denomination.
4. When the note is held up to the light, printed areas on the back of the note fill the unprinted areas on the front of the note.
5. The image of the nightingale and the figure 100 can be seen in this area as the viewing angle is altered.
- 1999
1. A 3-dimensional watermark representing the portrait of Lydia Koidula is located at the light right-hand area of the note. A vertically oriented denomination number electrotype watermark denomination number "100" is located in the upper right corner of the banknote.
2. A holographic foil stripe runs from top to bottom close to the left edge of the note. The foil stripe depicts two seals of the Bank of Estonia, both surrounded by two coat of arms' lions oriented towards the seal. One pair of lions is shown in a "positive" form while the other pair in a "negative" form of holographic artwork. "Pump effect" dynamics of the line structure surrounding the lions appears if the note is tilted with respect to the light. The wavy left border of the foil stripe is surrounded by a repeated microtext "EESTI PANK 100" and regularly placed denomination numbers "100". The foil stripe is partially intaglio and offset overprinted.
3. A dark security thread, placed about 45 mm from the right edge of the note with the transparent text "100 EEK EESTI PANK" in all four possible orientations, is fully embedded into the banknote paper.
4. The hand engraved portrait, the text EESTI PANK, the large denomination numbers, the Eesti Pank seal, the text "SADA KROONI", as well as the signatures of the president and chairman of the board, can be felt with the fingertips because of the raised relief of the intaglio print.
5. The intaglio microprint, repeated text "LYDIA KOIDULA" located below the portrait is only legible if viewed through a magnifying glass.
6. The upper rightmost leaf of the nightingale motif is filled with offset microprinted repeated number "100"s.
7. The latent number "100" can be seen on the rosette area if the note is turned at a very flat angle against the light at eye level (tilting effect).
8. The colorless embossed latent lettering "EP" can be found in the lower right-hand area of the nightingale motif if the note is turned at a very flat angle against the light at eye level (tilting effect).
9. The note is signed by the President as well as the chairman of the board of Eesti Pank, Mr. Vahur Kraft and Mr. Mart Sõrg respectively.
10. The light borders of the banknote and the watermark area are covered with a faint anti-copier line structure.
11. A special high relief sign - • - is incorporated at the lower right corner of the banknote for better recognition by the visually handicapped. The sign represents the letter "K" of the Morse alphabet designating the name Koidula.
12. Fragments printed on the front and back side form the number "100" when the note is held up to the light. Integration of the fragments is precise without any brakes or distortions because of the simultaneous printing of both sides of the banknote by a technique available only to security printers.
13. Invisible fibres are incorporated into the banknote paper. These fibres emit green and blue light when the note is exposed to ultraviolet light.
14. A green block bearing the number "100" becomes visible above the nightingale motif when the note is exposed to ultraviolet light. The block is invisible in daylight.
15. The nightingale motif, register mark fragments, and security thread fluoresce when the note is exposed to ultraviolet light.
16. The large denomination numerals located to the right of the portrait (front) and to the left of the centre (back) are filled with the repeated microtext number "100" with spacing decreasing from the top of the numerals to the bottom.
17. The two serial numbers printed in the upper left (green) and lower right (black) corners of the banknote consist of two letters and six numerals.
18. The block in the lower right corner of the banknote is printed with color shifting ink. The appearance of this area changes from green to blue or vice versa if the angle of view is changed by moving the note.
19. Hidden images, invisible to the naked eye, have been incorporated into the darker areas at the top and bottom of the banknote. These images become visible only if viewed through the special lens.
20. The light borders of the banknote are covered with a fine faint anti-copier line structure.
- 2000
1. The security thread of the banknote is wider and UV-fluorescent. The security thread has dark edges visible on either the front or back side of the banknote.
2. Signature of Governor of Eesti Pank Mr Andres Lipstok.
3. Year 2007.
4. UV-fluorescent rectangular mark with the denomination 100 is placed on the back of the note.

== See also ==
- Currencies related to the euro
- Estonian euro coins
- Currency board
- Estonian mark
- Economy of Estonia
