= 10 krooni =

Estonian banknote

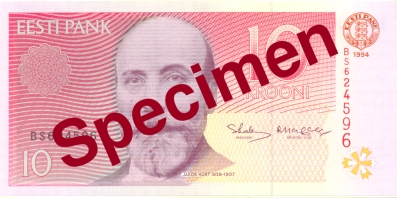
Obverse of the 10 krooni bill

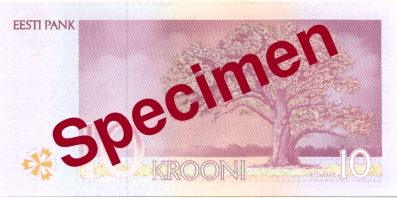
Reverse of the 10 krooni bill

The 10 krooni banknote (10 EEK) is a denomination of the Estonian kroon, the former currency of Estonia. Jakob Hurt (1839–1907), who was an Estonian folklorist, theologian, linguist and prominent social figure during the Estonian national awakening in the 19th–20th century, is featured with an engraved portrait on the obverse side of the banknote. The 10 krooni bill is sometimes called a "Hurt".

A view of the Tamme-Lauri oak tree at Urvaste is featured on the reverse.

The EEK has been withdrawn and replaced by the euro, but the 10 krooni can be exchanged indefinitely at the currency museum of Eesti Pank for €0.64.

== History ==
- 1991: first series issued by the Bank of Estonia;
- 1992: second series issued;
- 1994: third series issued;
- 2006: fourth series issued;
- 2007: fifth series issued;
- 2011: withdrawn from circulation and replaced by the euro

== Security features ==
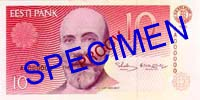
Obverse of the 1991 first series banknote

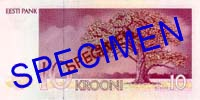
Reverse of the 1991 first series banknote

- 1991;1992
1. The watermark of the three lions is visible when the note is horizontal, but springs to life when the note is held against the light. The watermark is in two parts on the edges of the note.
2. Each note contains a security thread.
3. The portraits are printed in the main colour of the note and their raised surface can be felt with the fingertips.
4. Each note has an individual serial number. The horizontal number on the left is printed in black and the vertical number on the right is printed in a different colour on each denomination.
5. When the note is held at an angle to the light, the denomination of the note can be seen.
- 1994
1. New colour tints have been used in these areas.
2. Silver ink has been incorporated into the note.
3. A new style serial number appears on the right-hand side, in a different colour for each denomination.
4. When the note is held up to the light, printed areas on the back of the note fill the unprinted areas on the front of the note.
- 2006
1. Portrait watermark.
2. Dark security thread with the transparent text "10 EEK EESTI PANK".
3. Microprint, repeated text "EESTI PANK".
4. Latent number "10".
5. Signatures. Governor, chairman of the board.
6. Anti-copying line-structure.
7. Tactile marks for the visually impaired.
8. When the note is held against the light, the printed areas on the back of the note fill the unprinted areas on the front of the note.
9. UV-fluorescent fibres glowing red.
10. UV-fluorescent security thread glowing blue.
11. UV-fluorescent rectangle with the denomination "10" inside.
12. Serial number.
13. UV-fluorescent ink area (front).
14. Fluorescent ink areas (back).

== See also ==
- Currencies related to the euro
- Estonian euro coins
- Currency board
- Estonian mark
- Economy of Estonia
