= 500 krooni =

Estonian banknote

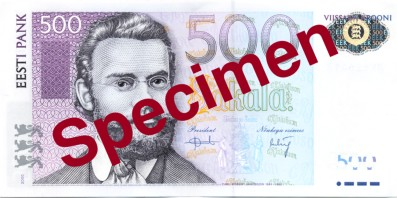
Obverse of the 500 krooni bill

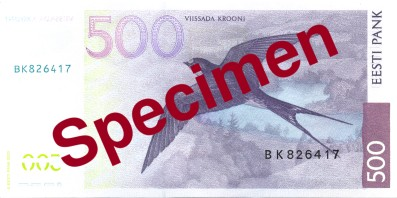
Reverse of the 500 krooni bill

The 500 krooni banknote (500 EEK) is a denomination of the Estonian kroon, the former currency of Estonia. Carl Robert Jakobson (1841–1882), who was an Estonian politician, publisher, writer and promoter of agriculture, is featured on the front side of the bill, which is why the 500 krooni bill is often called a "Jakobson".

A barn swallow in flight on a landscape background is featured on the reverse side of the banknote. Before the replacement of the EEK by the euro, the 500 krooni banknote was commonly dispensed by ATMs in Estonia as well as the primary banknote used for withdrawals or cashing checks. It can be exchanged indefinitely at the currency museum of Eesti Pank for €31.96.

== History of the banknote ==
- 1991: first series issued by the Bank of Estonia;
- 1994: second series issued;
- 1996: third series issued;
- 2000: fourth series issued;
- 2007: fifth series issued;
- 2011: withdrawn from circulation and replaced by the euro

== Security features ==
- 1991
1. The watermark of the three lions is visible when the note is horizontal, but springs to life when the note is held against the light. The watermark is in two parts on the edges of the note.
2. Each note contains a security thread.
3. The portraits are printed in the main colour of the note and their raised surface can be felt with the fingertips.
4. Each note has an individual serial number. The horizontal number on the left is printed in black and the vertical number on the right is printed in a different colour on each denomination.
5. When the note is held at an angle to the light, the denomination of the note can be seen.
- 1994
1. New colour tints have been used in these areas.
2. Silver ink has been incorporated into the note.
3. A new style serial number appears on the right-hand side.
4. When the note is held up to the light, printed areas on the back of the note fill the unprinted areas on the front of the note.
5. The colour of the ink in this area changes when the note is viewed from different angles.
- 1996
1. Hologram featuring a swallow and the value '500'.
2. A new hand-engraved portrait of Carl Robert Jakobson.
3. A windowed thread with small text reading '500/EP'. The thread appears as a row of small silver dashes on the front surface of the note, but when the note is held up to the light it can be seen as a continuous line.
4. When the note is held up to the light, printed areas on the back of the note fill unprinted areas on the front of the note to form the value '500'.
5. Silver ink has been incorporated into the note.
6. New colour tints have been used in these areas.
7. New signatures and date.
- 2000
1. Portrait watermark.
2. Diffraction foil with microtext border (Exelgram).
3. Dark security thread with transparent text "500EEK EESTI PANK".
4. Tactile intaglio printed elements.
5. Microprint, repeated text "CARL ROBERT JAKOBSON".
6. Microprint, repeated "500" within denomination numerals.
7. Latent number "500".
8. Latent lettering "EP".
9. Signatures (President of Eesti Pank, Chairman of the Board).
10. Three lions printed with silver ink.
11. Anti-copier line structure.
12. Recognition sign for the visually handicapped.
13. Number "500" appears when the note is held up to the light.
14. UV-fluorescent fibres.
15. UV-fluorescent motif ("Sakala") and security thread.
16. UV-fluorescent block bearing denomination number.
17. Serial numbers.
18. Variable ink element with magenta-to-green color shift.
19. Hidden image, visible through a special lens.

== See also ==
- Currencies related to the euro
- Estonian euro coins
- Currency board
- Estonian mark
- Economy of Estonia
