= 50 krooni =

Estonian banknote

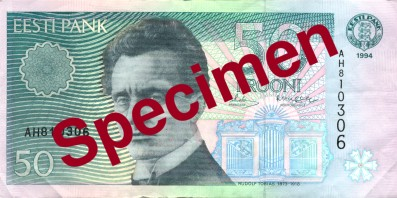
Obverse of the 50 krooni bill

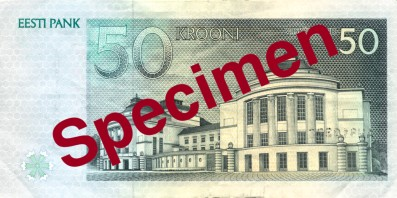
Reverse of the 50 krooni bill

The 50 krooni banknote (50 EEK) is a denomination of the Estonian kroon, the former currency of Estonia. A portrait of Rudolf Tobias (1873–1918), a famous Estonian composer, is engraved on the front side of the bill along with the pipe organ of the Käina church (which features the Eye of Providence).

The vignette on the back features the Estonia Theatre in Tallinn. The only printing of the 50 krooni banknote took place in 1994. Fewer 50 krooni notes were ordered by the Bank of Estonia than any other denominations. A medium size banknote, it was one of the most rarely used denominations. It can be exchanged indefinitely at the currency museum of Eesti Pank for €3.20.

== History of the banknote ==
- 1994: First and only series issued by the Bank of Estonia;
- 2011: withdrawn from circulation and replaced by the euro

== Security features ==
- 1994
1. The watermark of three lions is visible when the note is horizontal, and can be seen clearly when the note is held against the light. The watermark is in two parts on the edges of the note.
2. Each note contains a security thread.
3. The portrait is printed in the main colour of the note and its raised surface can be felt with the fingertips.
4. Each note has an individual serial number. The horizontal number on the left and the novel style vertical number on the right are printed in black.
5. Silver ink has been incorporated into the note.
6. When the note is held at an angle to the light, the denomination of the note can be seen.

== See also ==
- Currencies related to the euro
- Estonian euro coins
- Currency board
- Estonian mark
- Economy of Estonia
