= 25 krooni =

Estonian banknote

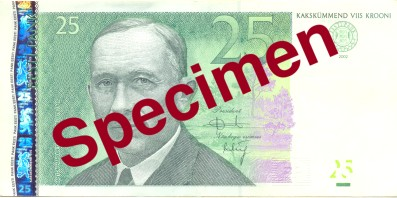
Obverse of the 25 krooni bill

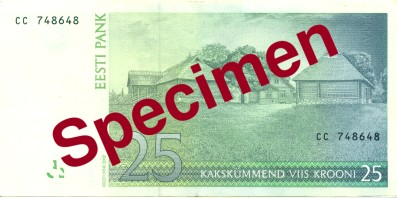
Reverse of the 25 krooni bill

The 25 krooni banknote (25 EEK) is a denomination of the Estonian kroon, the former currency of Estonia. A. H. Tammsaare (1870–1940), who was a famous Estonian writer of classical literature, is featured on the front side of the bill, which is why the 25 krooni banknote is often called a "Tammekas or Tammsaare".

A view of Vargamäe is featured on the reverse side of the banknote. Before the replacement of the EEK by the euro, the 25 krooni was frequently used in everyday transactions. It can be exchanged indefinitely at the currency museum of Eesti Pank for €1.60.

== History of the banknote ==
- 1991: first series issued by the Bank of Estonia;
- 1992: second series issued;
- 2002: third series issued;
- 2007: fourth series issued;
- 2011: withdrawn from circulation and replaced by the euro

== Security features ==
- 1991
1. The watermark of the three lions is visible when the note is horizontal, but springs to life when the note is held against the light. The watermark is in two parts on the edges of the note.
2. Each note contains a security thread.
3. The portraits are printed in the main colour of the note and their raised surface can be felt with the fingertips.
4. Each note has an individual serial number. The horizontal number on the left is printed in black and the vertical number on the right is printed in a different colour on each denomination.
5. When the note is held at an angle to the light, the denomination of the note can be seen.
- 2002
1. Portrait watermark.
2. Holographic foil stripe with microtext border.
3. Dark security thread with transparent text "25EEK EESTI PANK".
4. Tactile intaglio printed elements.
5. Microprint, repeated text "ANTON HANSEN-TAMMSAARE".
6. Microprint, repeated "25" within denomination numerals.
7. Latent number "25".
8. Latent lettering "EP".
9. Signatures: President, Chairman of the Board.
10. Anti-copier line-structure.
11. Recognition sign for the visually handicapped.
12. Number "25" appears when the note is held up to the light.
13. UV-fluorescent fibres.
14. UV-fluorescent motif of boggy landscape and security thread.
15. UV-fluorescent block bearing denomination number.
16. Serial numbers.

== See also ==
- Currencies related to the euro
- Estonian euro coins
- Currency board
- Estonian mark
- Economy of Estonia
