= 2 krooni =

Estonian banknote

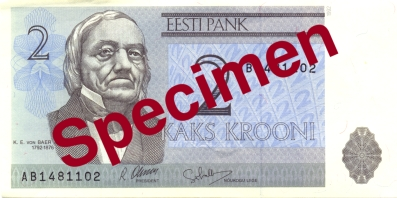
Obverse of the 2 krooni bill

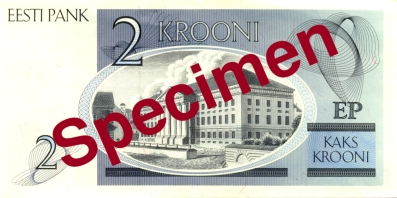
Reverse of the 2 krooni bill

The 2 krooni banknote (2 EEK) is a denomination of the Estonian kroon, the former currency of Estonia. Karl Ernst von Baer, who was an Estonian Baltic German anthropologist, naturalist and geographer (1792–1876), is featured with a portrait on the obverse. The 2 krooni bill is called sometimes a "kahene" meaning "a two".

A view of Tartu University which was founded in 1632 is featured on the reverse. Before the replacement of the EEK by the euro, the 2 krooni banknote was the smallest denomination most commonly used by Estonian residents on an everyday basis. It can be exchanged indefinitely at the currency museum of Eesti Pank for €0.13.

== History of the banknote ==
- 1992: first series issued by the Bank of Estonia;
- 2006: second series issued;
- 2007: third series issued;
- 2011: withdrawn from circulation and replaced by the euro

== Security features ==
- 1992
1. On the right-hand side of the banknote there is a watermark depicting the Tall Hermann Tower of Toompea Castle.
2. The paper of the banknotes contains security fibres of different colour.
3. Each note contains a security strip.
4. Each banknote has a seven-digit serial number printed in black.
- 2006
1. Portrait watermark.
2. Dark security thread with transparent text "2 EEK EESTI PANK".
3. Microprint, repeated text "EESTI PANK".
4. Tactile intaglio-printed elements.
5. Latent number "2".
6. Signatures. Governor, Chairman of the Board.
7. Anti-copier line-structure.
8. UV-fluorescent fibres glowing green.
9. UV-fluorescent security thread glowing blue.
10. UV-fluorescent rectangle with the denomination "2".
11. Serial numbers.

== See also ==
- Currencies related to the euro
- Estonian euro coins
- Currency board
- Estonian mark
- Economy of Estonia
