= 5 krooni =

Estonian banknote

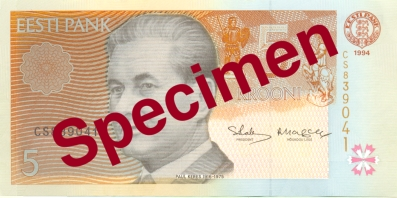
Obverse of the 5 krooni bill

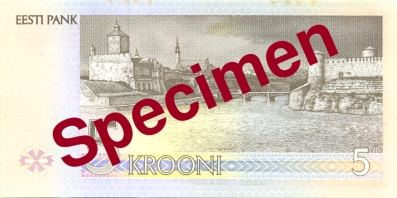
Reverse of the 5 krooni bill

The 5 krooni banknote (5 EEK) is a denomination of the Estonian kroon, the former currency of Estonia. Paul Keres (1916–1975), who was a world-famous Estonian chess player, international Grandmaster and prominent chess theorist, is featured with an engraved portrait on the obverse.

The reverse features Hermann Castle founded in 1256 by the Danes and Ivangorod Fortress established by Ivan III in 1492. The 5 krooni banknote was only issued shortly after the reestablishment of the Estonian state in 1991, but remained in common use until the EEK was replaced by the euro. A 5 krooni coin was also minted but the banknote was more commonly found in circulation. The note can be exchanged indefinitely at the currency museum of Eesti Pank for €0.32.

== History of the banknote ==
- 1991: first series issued by the Bank of Estonia;
- 1992: second series issued;
- 1994: third series issued;
- 2011: withdrawn from circulation and replaced by the euro

== Security features ==
- 1991;1992
1. The watermark of the three lions is visible when the note is horizontal, but springs to life when the note is held against the light. The watermark is in two parts on the edges of the note.
2. Each note contains a security thread.
3. The portraits are printed in the main colour of the note and their raised surface can be felt with the fingertips.
4. Each note has an individual serial number. The horizontal number on the left is printed in black and the vertical number on the right is printed in a different colour on each denomination.
5. When the note is held at an angle to the light, the denomination of the note can be seen.
- 1994
1. New colour tints have been used in these areas.
2. Silver ink has been incorporated into the note.
3. A new style serial number appears on the right-hand side, in a different colour for each denomination.
4. When the note is held up to the light, printed areas on the back of the note fill the unprinted areas on the front of the note.

== See also ==
- Currencies related to the euro
- Estonian euro coins
- Currency board
- Estonian mark
- Economy of Estonia
