= Estonian kroon =

Former currency of Estonia

Eesti kroon (Estonian)
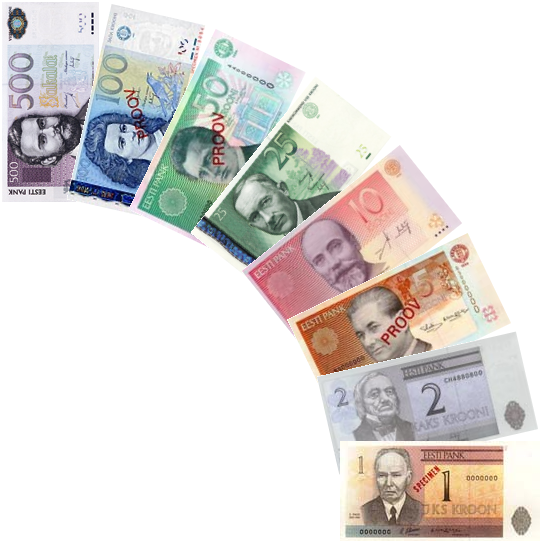
Banknotes of the Estonia kroon.
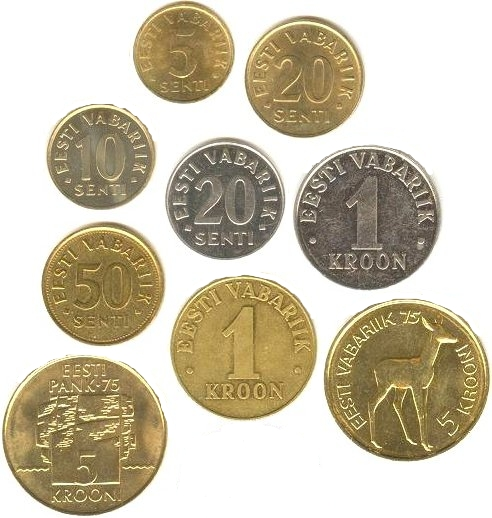
Coins of the Estonia kroon.

ISO 4217
- Code: EEK

Units of account
- Plural: krooni (Estonian partitive sg.)
- Symbol: KR
- Nickname: paper, The family names of the persons on notes: 100 KR – Koidula, 500 KR – Jakobson etc.
- Subunit
- 1/100: sent
- Plural
- sent: senti (Estonian partitive sg.)

Denominations
- Banknotes
- Freq. used: 1 KR, 2 KR, 5 KR, 10 KR, 25 KR, 50 KR, 100 KR, 500 KR
- Coins
- Freq. used: 10, 20, 50 senti, 1 KR
- Rarely used: 5 senti, 5 KR

Demographics
- Date of introduction: 20 June 1992
- Replaced: Soviet ruble (SUR); 10 SUR = 1 EEK
- Date of withdrawal: December 31, 2010
- Replaced by: Euro (EUR); 15.6466 EEK = 1 EUR
- User(s): None, previously: Estonia

Issuance
- Central bank: Bank of Estonia
- Website: www.eestipank.ee

Valuation
- Inflation: 2.8%
- Source: European Central Bank, May 2010
- Method: HICP

EU Exchange Rate Mechanism (ERM)
- Since: 28 June 2004
- Fixed rate since: 31 December 1998
- Replaced by euro, non cash: 1 January 2011
- Replaced by euro, cash: 14 January 2011
- 1 € =: 15.6466 KR
- Band: did not fluctuate
- This infobox shows the latest status before this currency was rendered obsolete.

The kroon (sign: KR; code: EEK) was the official currency of Estonia for two periods in history: 1928–1940 and 1992–2011. Between 1 January and 14 January 2011, the kroon circulated together with the euro, after which the euro became the sole legal tender in Estonia. The kroon was subdivided into 100 cents (senti; singular sent).

The word kroon (Estonian pronunciation: [ˈkroːn], "crown") is related to that of the Nordic currencies (such as the Swedish krona and the Danish and Norwegian krone) and derived from the Latin word corona ("crown"). The kroon succeeded the mark in 1928 and was in use until the Soviet invasion in 1940 and Estonia's subsequent incorporation into the Soviet Union when it was replaced by the Soviet ruble. After Estonia regained its independence, the kroon was reintroduced in 1992 and replaced by the euro in 2011.

== First kroon, 1928–1940 ==
=== History ===
The kroon became the currency of Estonia on 1 September 1928 after having been a unit of account since 1924. It replaced the mark at a rate of 100 marks = 1 kroon. The kroon was subdivided into 100 senti.

In 1924, the kroon was pegged to the Swedish krona at par, with a gold standard of 2,480 KR = 1 kilogram of pure gold. The standard received real coverage with the reserves backing the kroon. The issue of treasury notes and exchange notes was terminated. In order to secure the credibility of the kroon, the Bank of Estonia exchanged kroon for foreign currency. All these measures restored confidence in the domestic banking and monetary sector, contributing to the economic reinvigoration of the country and to the improvement of the reputation of the Estonian state in the international arena.

During the Great Depression in 1933, the kroon went off the gold standard, devalued 35% and obtained a currency peg with sterling at £1 stg = 18.35 KR. The Estonian kroon kept this peg and circulated until the Soviet occupation of 1940. The kroon was exchanged for the Soviet ruble at a rate of 1 Rbl = 0.8 KR.

=== Banknotes and coins ===
In 1928, the first coins of this currency were issued, nickel-bronze 25 senti pieces. These were followed by bronze 1 sent in 1929, silver 2 krooni in 1930, bronze 5 senti and nickel-bronze 10 senti in 1931, silver 1 kroon in 1933, bronze 2 senti and aluminium-bronze 1 kroon in 1934, nickel-bronze 20 senti in 1935, nickel-bronze 50 senti in 1936.

On 25 July 1940, 4 days after the founding of the Estonian SSR, the last Estonian pre-WW II coin, the new 1 sent (date 1939), was issued.

In 1927, before the kroon was officially introduced, 100 mark banknotes circulated overprinted as "ÜKS KROON" (1 kroon). Eesti Pank introduced 10 krooni notes in 1928, followed by 5 KR and 50 KR in 1929, 20 KR in 1932 and 100 KR in 1935.

1928–1935 Issue
Image	Denomination	Obverse	Reverse
	5 KR	Fisherman	Coat of arms of Estonia
	10 KR	Estonian girl wearing a national costume and holding sheaves	Coat of arms of Estonia
	20 KR	Shepherd	Coat of arms of Estonia
	50 KR	Rannamõisa	Coat of arms of Estonia
	100 KR	Blacksmith	Coat of arms of Estonia

== Second kroon, 1992–2010 ==
=== History ===
The kroon was reintroduced as Estonia's currency on 20 June 1992, replacing the Soviet rouble at a rate of 1 KR = 10 Rbls. (Each person was able to change a maximum of 1,500 Rbls to 150 KR.) Initially, the Estonian kroon was pegged to the Deutsche Mark at a rate of 8 KR = DM 1. After the introduction of the euro the fixed exchange rate of DM 1.95583 to the euro led to an exchange rate of 15.64664 KR to the euro. On 28 June 2004, as Estonia joined the ERM II-system, the central parity of the Estonian kroon was revalued (by less than 0.001%) to 15.6466 KR per euro. On 1 January 2011 the euro replaced the kroon as the official currency of Estonia. The kroon circulated alongside the euro until 15 January 2011 at which point it ceased to be legal tender. However, the Eesti Pank will indefinitely exchange kroon banknotes and coins in any amount into euro.

=== Banknotes ===
In 1992, banknotes were introduced in denominations of 1, 2, 5, 10, 25, 100, and 500 krooni. Some of the 5, 10, 25, 100, and 500 krooni notes were dated 1991. In 1994, a 50 KR note was introduced. Unlike others, the 1 KR and 50 KR notes were issued only once.

Notes in circulation before being replaced by the euro:

- 1 KR (1992),
- 2 KR (1992, 2006, 2007),
- 5 KR (1991, 1992, 1994),
- 10 KR (1991, 1992, 1994, 2006, 2007),
- 25 KR (1991, 1992, 2002, 2007),
- 50 KR (1994),
- 100 KR (1991, 1992, 1994, 1999, 2007),
- 500 KR (1991, 1994, 1996, 2000, 2007).

Banknotes of Estonia
Image		Value	Euro equivalent	Dimensions (mm)	Main color	Description		Date of	
Obverse	Reverse	Value	Euro equivalent	Dimensions (mm)	Main color	Obverse	Reverse	first printing	issue
		1 kroon	€0.06	140 × 69	Orange/Brown	Kristjan Raud	Toompea Castle	1992	
		2 krooni	€0.13	140 × 69	Grayish blue	Karl Ernst von Baer	University of Tartu	1992, 2006, 2007	
		5 krooni	€0.32	140 × 69	Orange	Paul Keres	Narva castle & Ivangorod fortress	1991, 1992, 1994	
		10 krooni	€0.64	140 × 69	Red	Jakob Hurt	Tamme-Lauri oak tree	1991, 1992, 1994, 2006, 2007	
		25 krooni	€1.60	140 × 69	Green	Anton Hansen Tammsaare	Vargamäe village	1991, 1992, 2002, 2007	
		50 krooni	€3.20	140 × 69	Cyan	Rudolf Tobias	Estonia Theatre	1994	
		100 krooni	€6.40	140 × 69	Light blue	Lydia Koidula	Baltic Klint	1991, 1992, 1994, 1999, 2007	
		500 krooni	€31.96	140 × 69	Purple	Carl Robert Jakobson	Barn swallow	1991, 1994, 1996, 2000, 2007	
These images are to scale at 0.7 pixel per millimetre (18 pixel per inch). For table standards, see the banknote specification table.

=== Coins ===
In 1992, coins were introduced (some dated 1991) in denominations of 5, 10, 20, & 50 senti, as well as 1 KR. The 1 KR was struck in cupronickel, the others in aluminum-bronze. However, in 1997, nickel-plated steel 20 senti were introduced, followed by aluminum-bronze 1 KR in 1998. 5 senti coins were not issued after 1994 but were still legal tender. The cupronickel 1 KR coins from 1992, 1993 and 1995 were demonetized on 31 May 1998 because they were too similar in weight and composition to DM 1 coins, and new 1 KR coins were issued. The 5 KR coins were commemorative pieces and were rarely seen in circulation.

Coins in circulation before being replaced by the euro:

- 5 senti (1991, 1992, 1995)
- 10 senti (1991, 1992, 1994, 1996, 1997, 1998, 2002, 2006, 2008)
- 20 senti (1992, 1996, 1997, 1999, 2003, 2004, 2006, 2008)
- 50 senti (1992, 2004, 2006, 2007)
- 1 kroon (1992, 1993, 1995, 1998, 2000, 2001, 2003, 2006, 2008)
- 5 krooni (1993, 1994).

Coins of the Estonian kroon (1991)
Image	Value	Diameter (mm)	Mass (g)	Composition	Edge	Obverse	Reverse	Issue
	5 senti	15.95	1.29	Copper 93%, Aluminum 5%, Nickel 2%	Smooth	Lettering: Eesti Vabariik and value	Coat of arms; year of issue	1991–1995
	10 senti	17.20	1.87	Copper 93%, Aluminum 5%, Nickel 2%	Smooth	Lettering: Eesti Vabariik and value	Coat of arms; year of issue	1991–2008
	20 senti	18.95	2.27	Copper 93%, Aluminum 5%, Nickel 2%	Smooth	Lettering: Eesti Vabariik and value	Coat of arms; year of issue	1992–1996
	20 senti	18.95	2.00	Nickel-plated steel	Smooth	Lettering: Eesti Vabariik and value	Coat of arms; year of issue	1996–2008
	50 senti	19.50	3.00	Copper 93%, Aluminum 5%, Nickel 2%	Smooth	Lettering: Eesti Vabariik and value	Coat of arms; year of issue	1992–2007
	1 KR	23.25	5.44	Cupronickel	Smooth	Lettering: Eesti Vabariik and value	Coat of arms; year of issue	1991–1995
	1 KR	23.25	5.00	Copper 89%, Aluminum 5%, Zinc 5%, Sn 1%	Interrupted reeding	Lettering: Eesti Vabariik and value	Coat of arms; year of issue	1998–2006
	5 KR	26.20	7.10	Copper 89%, Aluminum 5%, Zinc 5%, Sn 1%	Smooth	Metskits by Jaan Koort; Lettering: Eesti Vabariik 75; 5 krooni	Coat of arms; year of issue	1993
	5 KR	26.20	7.10	Copper 89%, Aluminum 5%, Zinc 5%, Sn 1%	Smooth	Lettering: Eesti Pank 75; 5 krooni	Coat of arms; year of issue	1994

== See also ==
- Currency board
- Economy of Estonia
- Estonian euro coins
- Estonian mark

Preceded by: Estonian mark Reason: independence Ratio: at par	Currency of Estonia; 1928 – 1940	Succeeded by: Soviet ruble Reason: Soviet Union occupation of the Baltic states Ratio: 1 ruble = 0.8 kroon
Preceded by: Soviet ruble Reason: independence from the Soviet Union; Ratio: at par	Currency of Estonia; 1992 – 2010	Succeeded by: Euro; Reason: entry into Eurozone; Ratio: 1 euro = 15.6466 krooni
