= 1 kroon =

Estonian banknote

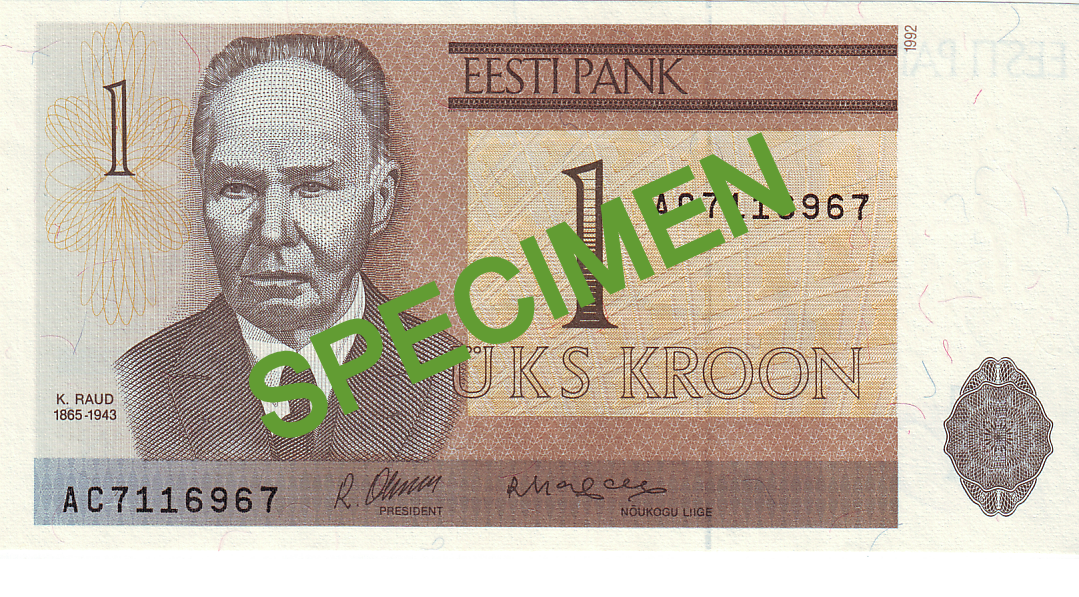
Obverse of the 1 krooni bill

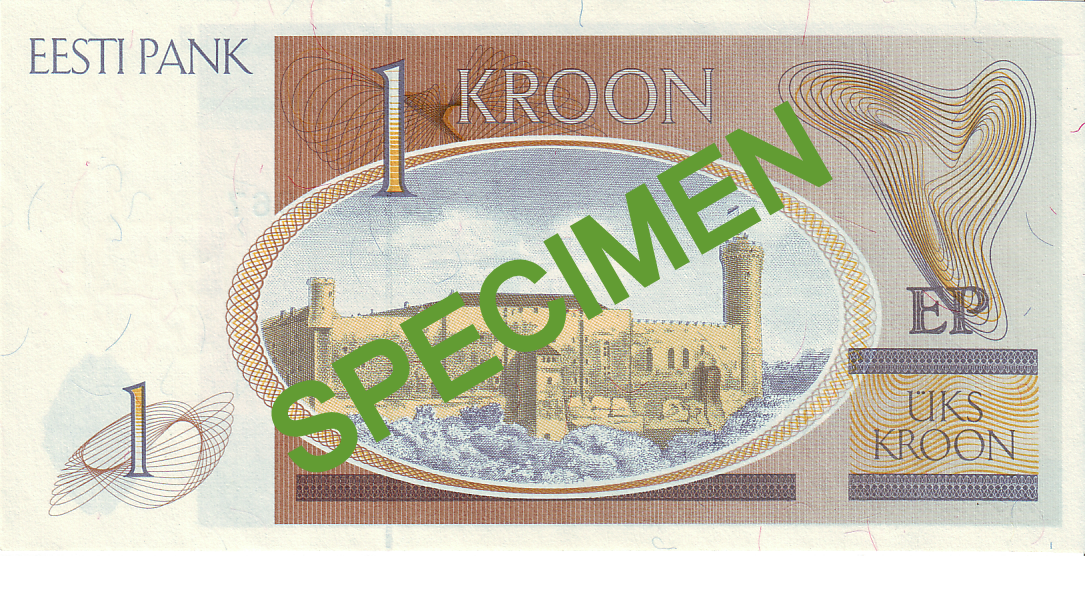
Reverse of the 1 krooni bill

The 1 kroon (1 EEK) is the smallest valued banknote of the Estonian kroon, the former currency of Estonia. Kristjan Raud (1865–1943), an Estonian painter, teacher, and cultural historian, is featured with a portrait on the obverse. A view of Toompea Castle in Tallinn appears on the reverse.

The 1 kroon was only issued once and had been steadily going out of circulation since a coin of the same value was also issued. At the time of replacement by the euro, it was very rarely found in use on an everyday basis. It can be exchanged indefinitely at the currency museum of Eesti Pank for €0.06.

== History of the banknote ==
- 1992: first and only series issued by the Bank of Estonia
- 2011: withdrawn from circulation and replaced by the euro

== Security features ==
- 1992
1. On the right-hand side of the banknote is a watermark depicting the Tall Hermann Tower of Toompea Castle.
2. The paper of the banknotes contains security fibres of different colour.
3. Each note contains a security strip.
4. Each banknote has a seven-digit serial number printed in black.

== See also ==
- Estonian kroon
- Bank of Estonia
- Economy of Estonia
