= Tamme-Lauri oak =

Thickest and oldest oak in Estonia

Coordinates: 57°55′2″N 26°34′36″E

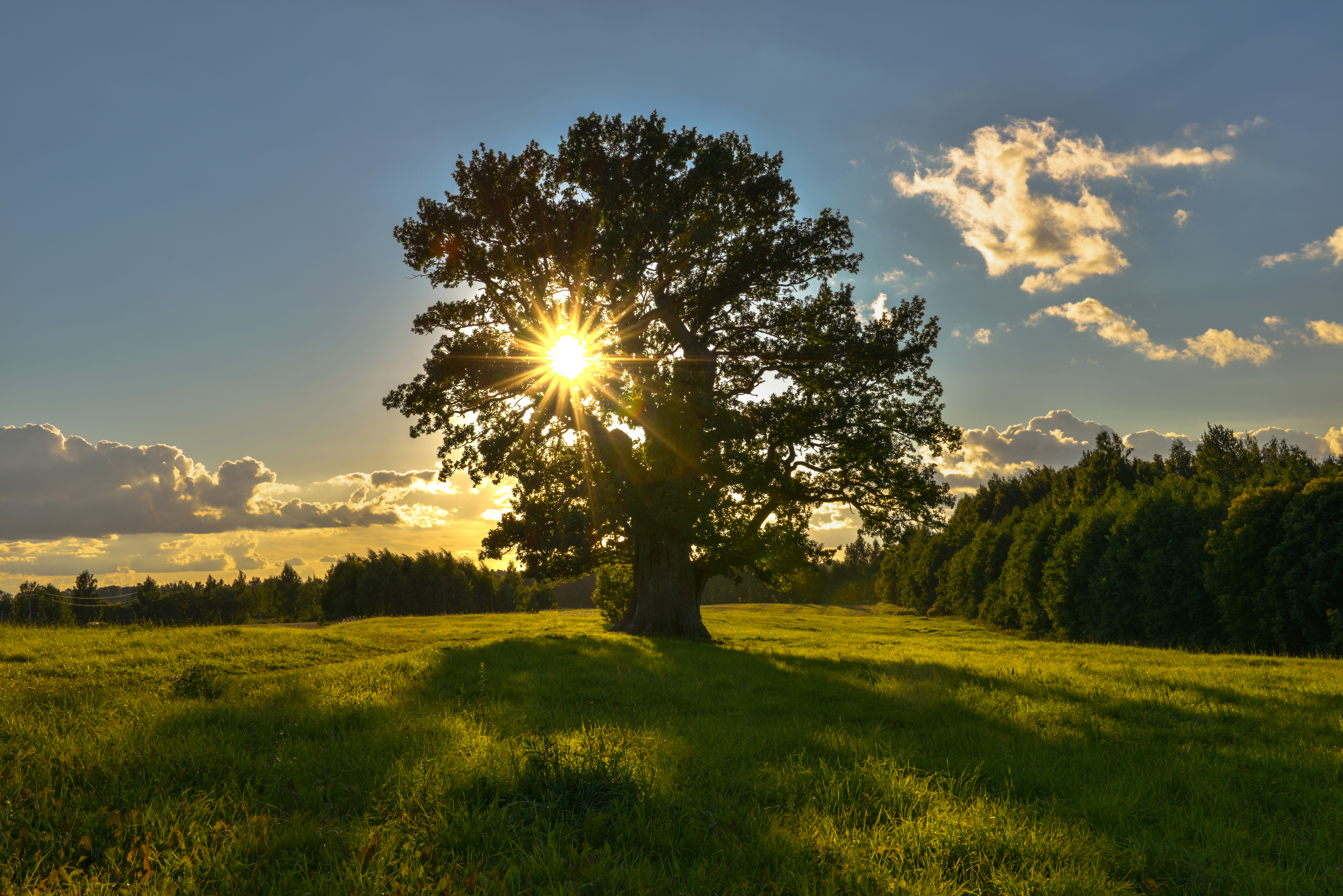
The Tamme-Lauri oak

The Tamme-Lauri oak (Estonian: Tamme-Lauri tamm, Võro: Tammõ-Lauri tamm) is a large common oak. It is the thickest and oldest tree in Estonia and is located in Antsla Parish, Võru County. The height of the tree is 17 metres (56 ft), and the circumference is 831 centimetres (327 in), measured 130 centimetres (51 in) from the ground. According to researchers, the tree was planted around 1326.

The oak has been hit repeatedly by lightning, damaging the branches and hollowing out the center. During restoration in the 1970s an old hideout of the Forest Brothers was found inside the cavity. Seven people could stand inside the tree before it was filled with 8 tonnes (18,000 lb) of reinforced concrete. The tree is still viable, although it has lost its top because of the lightning strikes.

The name of the Tamme-Lauri oak comes from the Tamme-Lauri farm, which in turn got its name from the spirit that was thought to live in the oak, bringing bad and sometimes good luck. It was the spirit of fire called Laurits.

The Tamme-Lauri oak is depicted on the reverse of the Estonian ten kroon banknote. The land where the tree is located was bought by Estonian Ministry of the Environment in 2006 and the oak has been under protection since 1939.

The Tamme-Lauri oak tree took part in the 2016 European Tree of the Year competition as a representative of Estonia, where it told the story of the legend that the tree started growing from a carriage part that a Swedish king hit into the ground.

Views of Tamme-Lauri oak

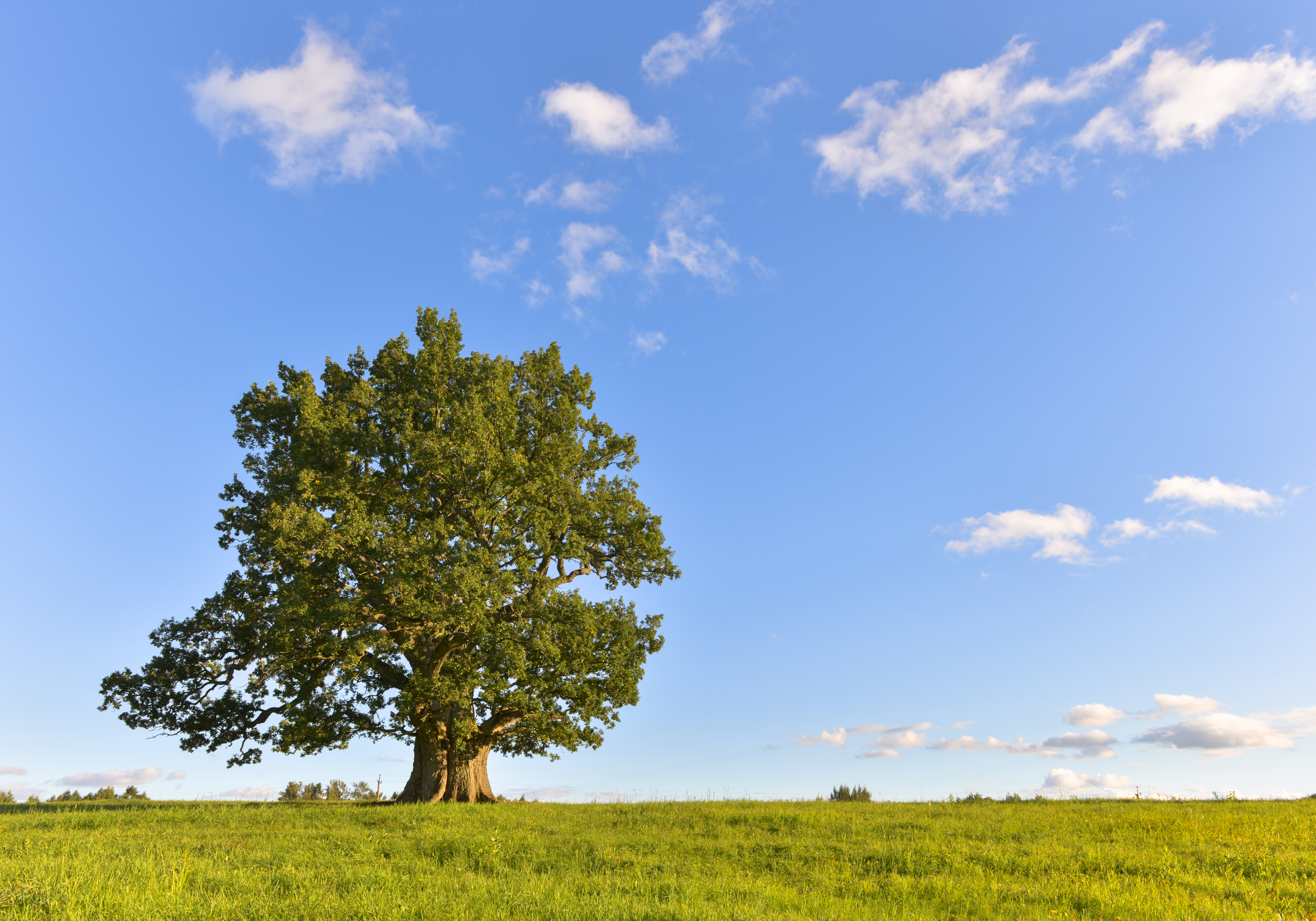

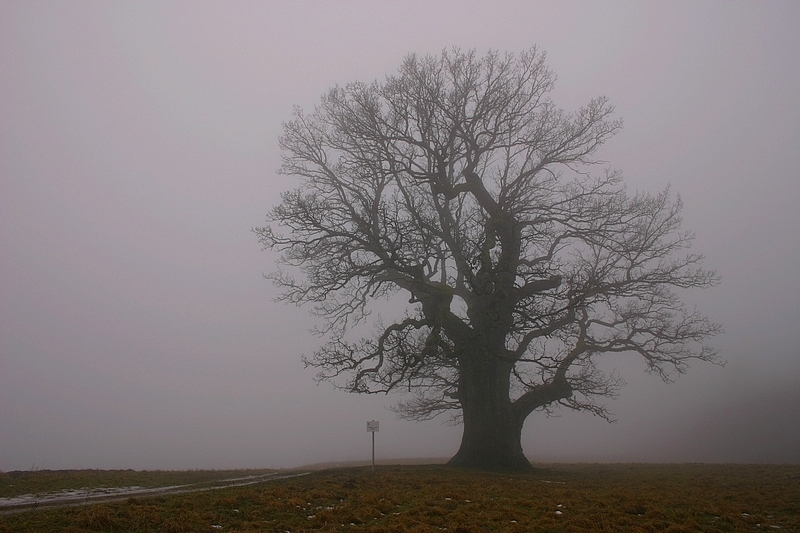

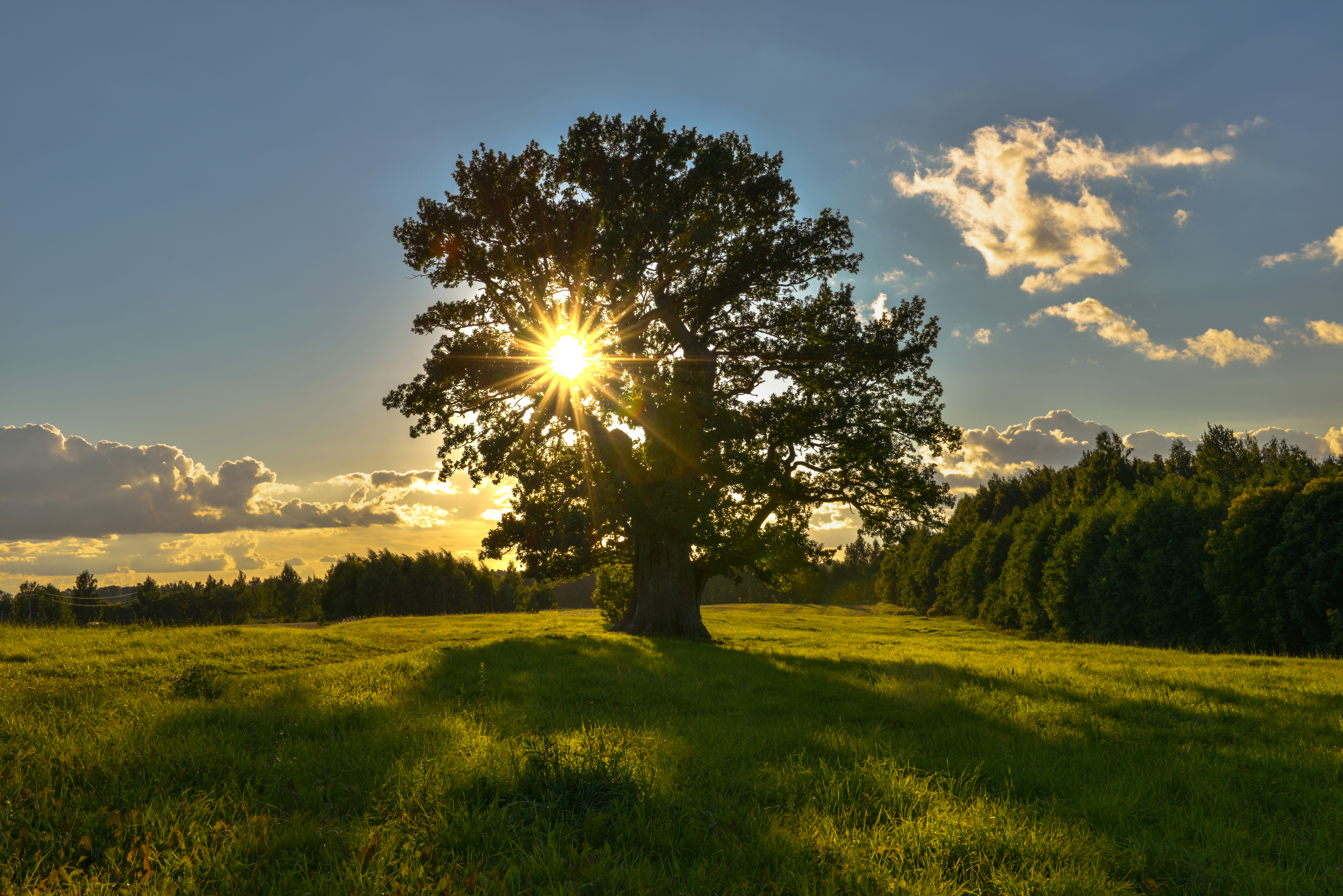

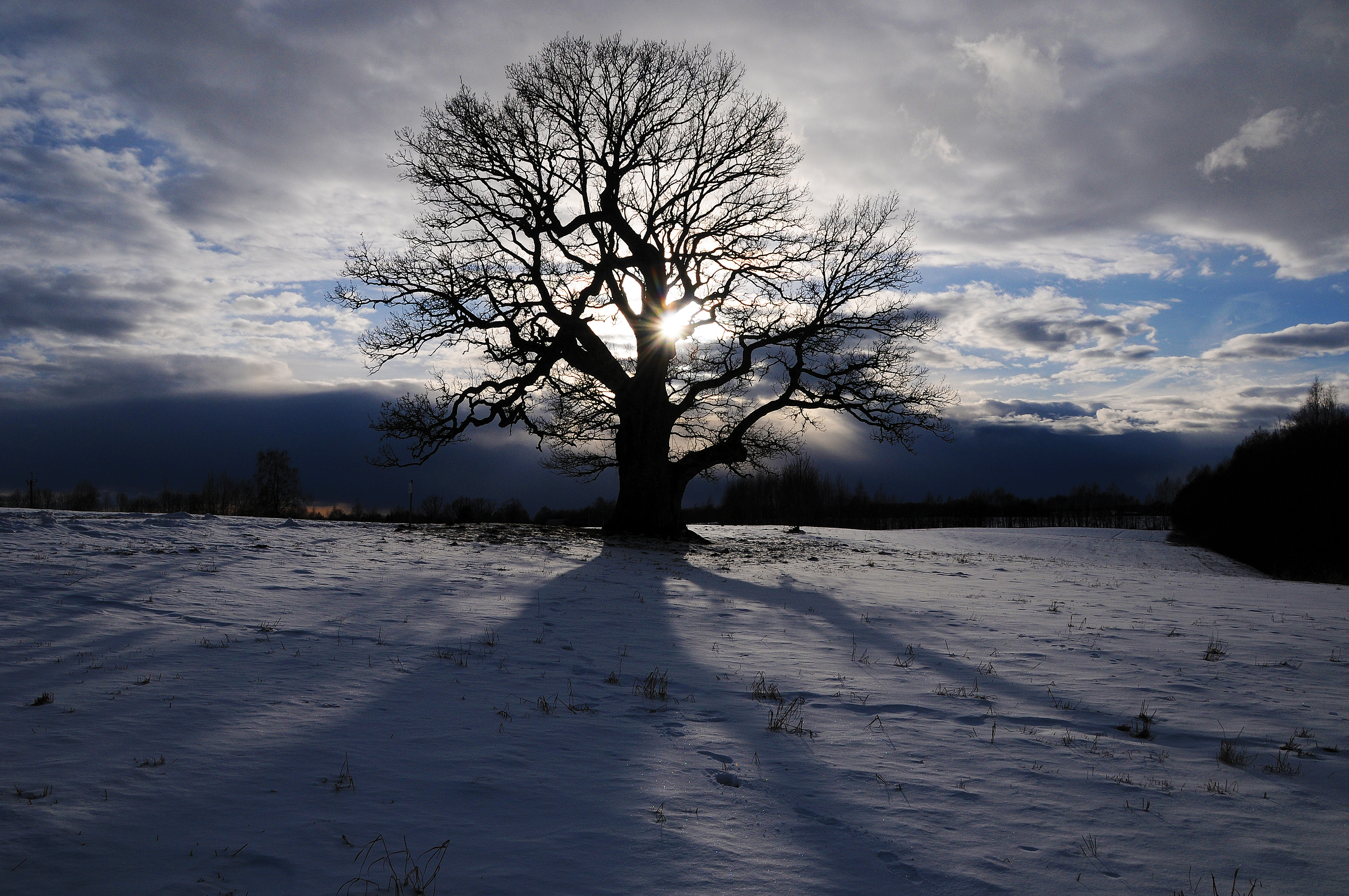

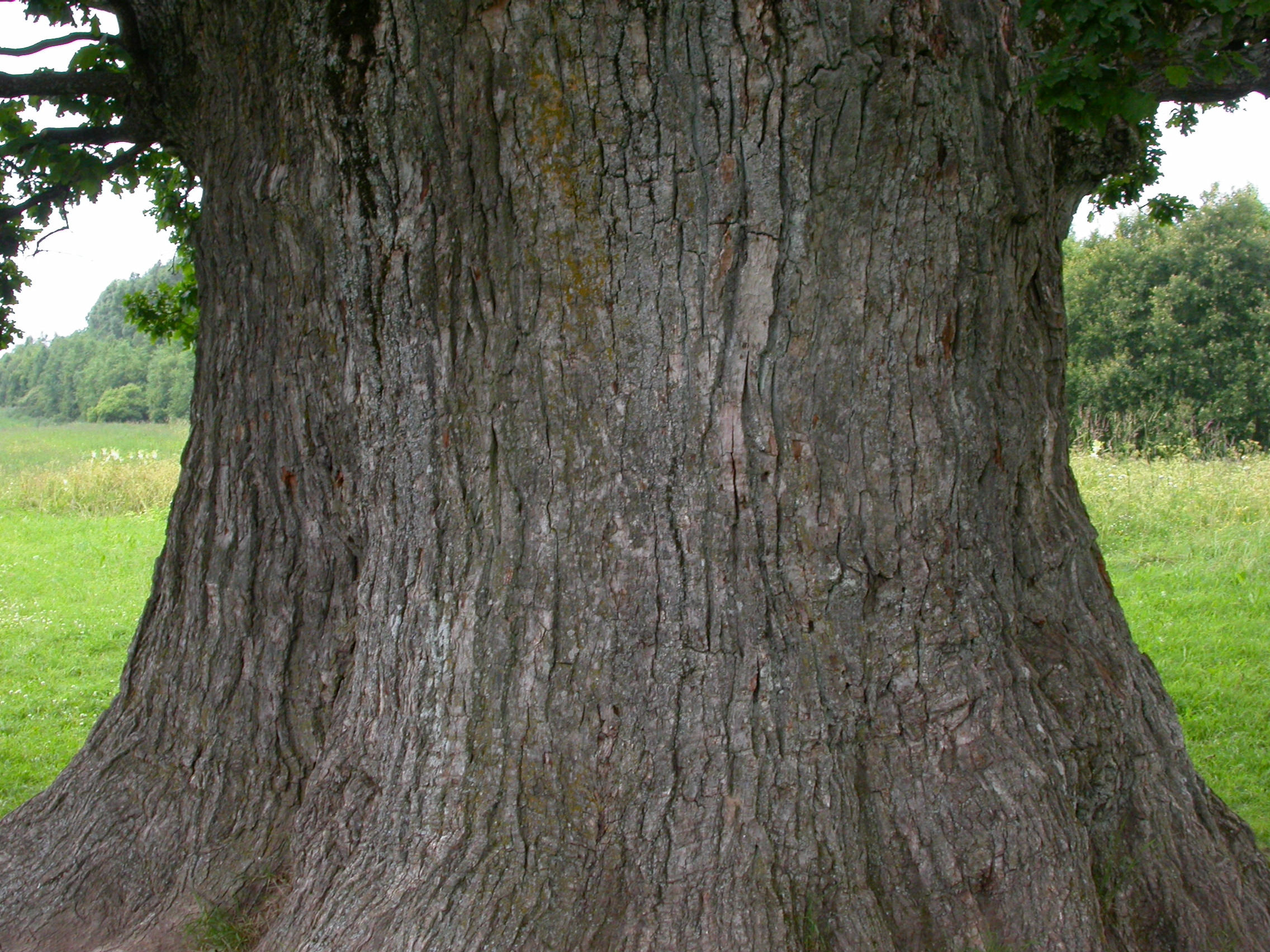

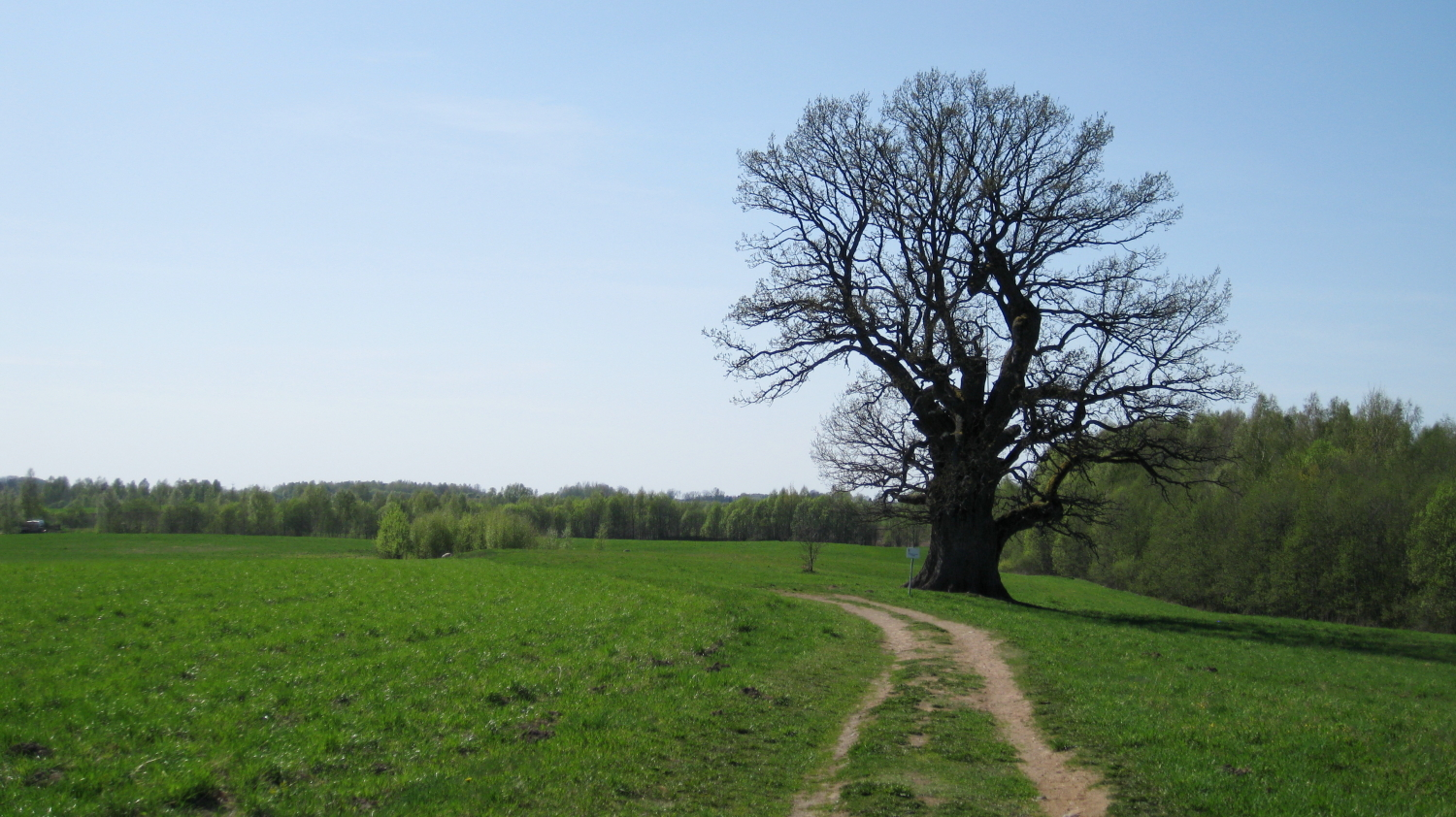

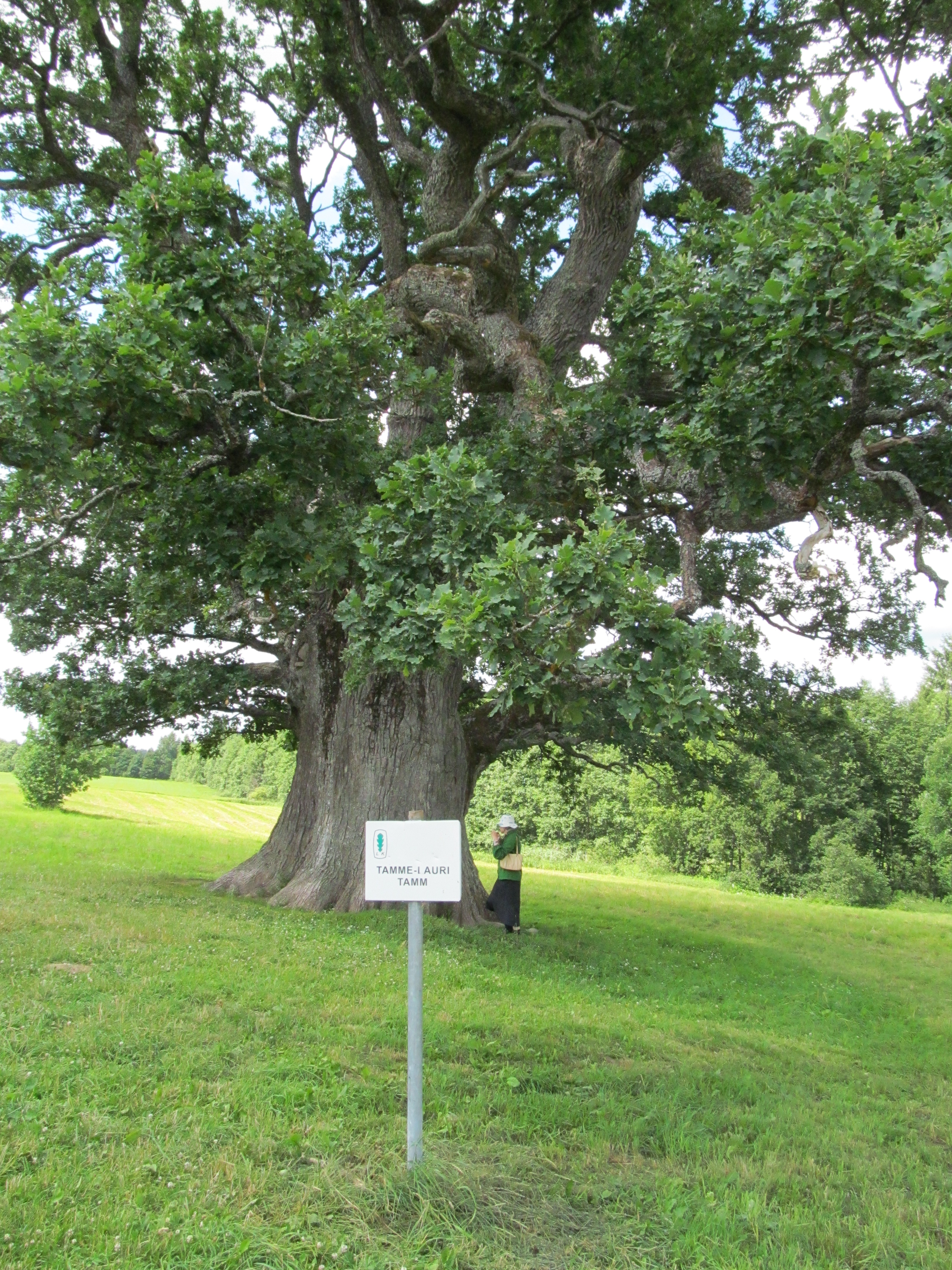

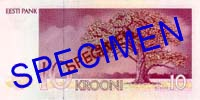
The oak on the Estonian ten kroon banknote

== See also ==
- List of individual trees
