= Economy of Estonia =

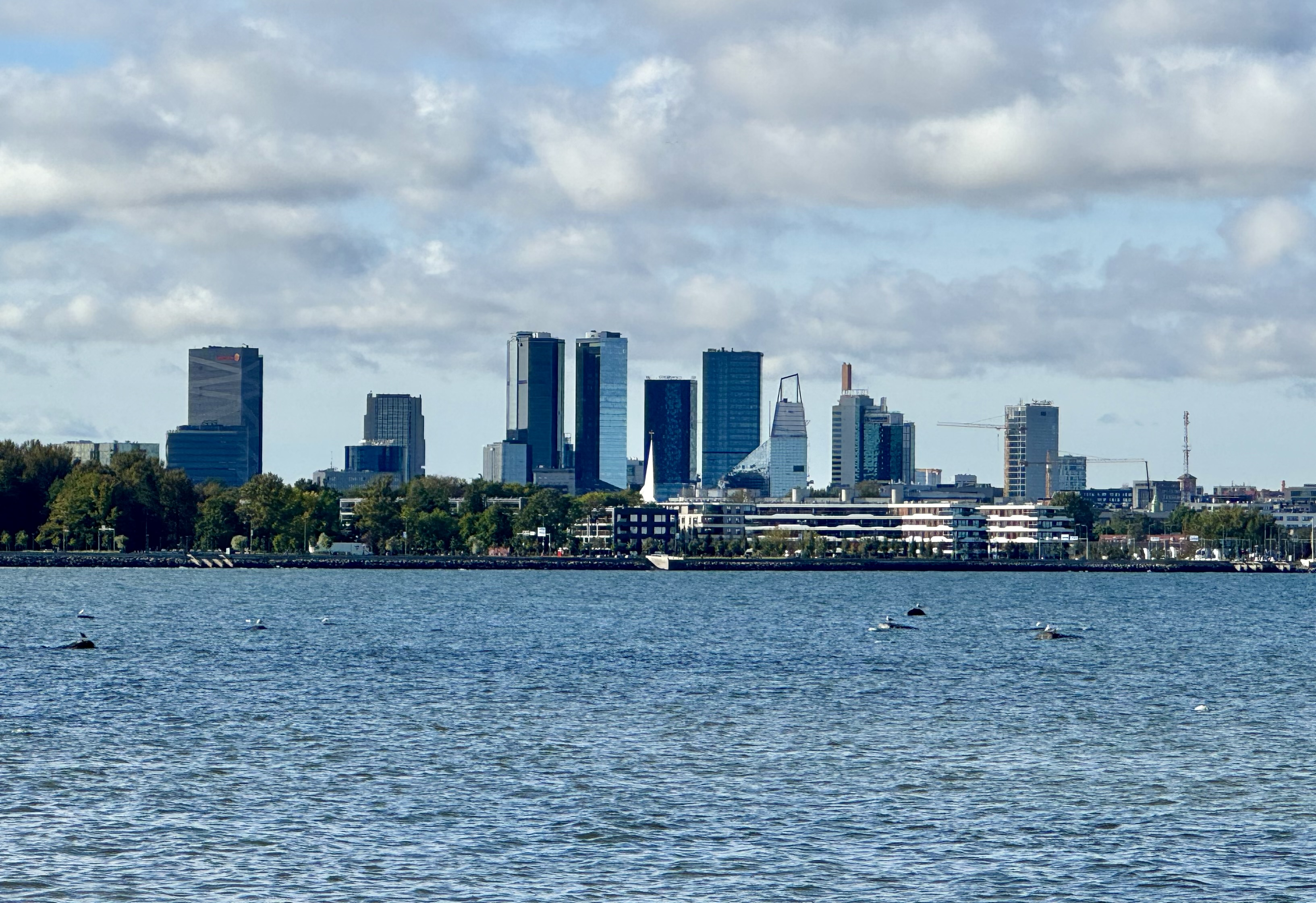
- Capital city Tallinn is the economic centre of Estonia
- Currency: Euro (EUR, €)
- Fiscal year: Calendar year
- Trade organisations: EU, WTO and OECD
- Country group: Advanced economy; High-income economy

Statistics
- Population: ▲1,369,285 (2021)
- GDP: $51.6 billion (nominal, 2026); $70.7 billion (PPP, 2026)
- GDP rank: 97th (nominal, 2026); 119th (PPP, 2026)
- GDP growth: −0.5% (2024); 2.2% (2025)
- GDP per capita: $37,718 (nominal, 2026); $51,653 (PPP, 2026)
- GDP per capita rank: 36th (nominal, 2026); 44th (PPP, 2026)
- GDP per capita growth: 1.0% (2025)
- GDP by sector: agriculture: 2.8%; industry: 29%; services: 68%; (2017 est.)
- Inflation (CPI): 9.1% (2023); 4.2% (2024); 2.5% (2025)
- Population below national poverty line: ▼20.2% – income below €807/month (2023); ▼24.2% at risk of poverty or social exclusion (AROPE 2023)
- Gini coefficient: ▼30.8 medium (2024)
- Human Development Index: ▲0.905 very high (2023) (36th); ▲0.841 very high IHDI (22nd) (2023)
- Corruption Perceptions Index: ▲73 out of 100 points (2023) (13th)
- Labour force: ▲755414 (2023); ▲82.1% employment rate (2023)
- Labour force by occupation: agriculture: 2.7%; industry: 20.5%; services: 76.8%; (2017 est.)
- Unemployment: ▼7.8% (July 2020); ▲23.2% youth unemployment (15 to 24 year-olds; June 2020)
- Average gross salary: €2,011 monthly (Q1 2025)
- Average net salary: €1,526 monthly (Q1 2025)
- Main industries: engineering, electronics, wood and articles of wood, textiles, information technology, telecommunications

External
- Exports: ▼€18.2 billion (2023)
- Export goods: Electrical equipment, agricultural products and food, wood and wooden articles, mineral products, transport equipment
- Main export partners: Finland 17%; Latvia 12%; Sweden 9%; Lithuania 8%; Germany 7%; Netherlands 4%; Others 43%; (2023)
- Imports: ▼€21.2 billion (2023)
- Import goods: Electrical equipment, transport equipment, mineral products, agricultural products and food, mechanical appliances
- Main import partners: Finland 15%; Germany 12%; Latvia 11%; Lithuania 10%; Sweden 8%; Netherlands 6%; Others 38%; (2023)
- FDI stock: ▲$27.05 billion (31 December 2017 est.); ▲ Abroad: $10.96 billion (31 December 2017 est.)
- Current account: ▲$809 million (2017 est.)
- Gross external debt: ▲$19.05 billion (31 December 2016 est.)

Public finance
- Government debt: 8.4% of GDP (2019); ▲€2.4 billion (2019)
- Foreign reserves: ▼$345 million (31 December 2017 est.)
- Budget balance: €90 million deficit (2019); −0.3% of GDP (2019)
- Revenue: 38.7% of GDP (2019)
- Spending: 39.0% of GDP (2019)
- Economic aid: €3.4 billion from European Structural and Investment Funds (2007–2013); €4.46 billion from European Structural and Investment Funds (2014–2020)
- Credit rating: Standard & Poor's: AA−; Fitch Ratings: A+; Moody's: A1; Scope Ratings: A+
- All values, unless otherwise stated, are in US dollars.

Estonia has an advanced developed economy. It is a member of the European Union, the eurozone, and the OECD. The economy is heavily influenced by developments in the Finnish and Swedish economies. After Estonia restored its independence in 1991 and became a market economy, it emerged as a pioneer in the global economy. Estonia styled itself as a bridge between East and West, adopting significant economic reforms and technological innovations.

In 1992, the country adopted the Estonian kroon as its currency, which was pegged to the Deutsche Mark at a rate of 8 kr = 1 Dm, this stabilised the economy. In 1994, it became the first country in the world to adopt a flat tax, with a rate of 26% regardless of personal income. Estonia received more foreign investment, per person, in the late 1990s than any other country in Central and Eastern Europe. The country has been catching-up with the EU-15 - the richer European countries. Its GDP per capita grew from 35% of the EU-15 average in 1996 to 65% in 2007, similar to Central European countries. GDP per capita (current US$) was $30,133 in 2023 according to the World Bank; this was between the Czech Republic and Bahrain, but below Saudi Arabia.

For Estonia, the 2008 financial crisis was easier to weather, because its budget has consistently been kept balanced, and this meant public debt relative to GDP remained the lowest in Europe. The economy recovered in 2010. In January 2011, Estonia adopted the euro, joining the eurozone. Estonia has demonstrated resilience, with a strong service sector, particularly in IT due to the Tiigrihüpe project, and advanced e-government services. Estonia's commitment to a circular economy, innovation and its success in maintaining a balanced budget, low public debt, and a competitive tax system have positioned it as a model of economic reform and growth in post-Soviet Europe.

== History ==
In the decades prior to World War I and independence, during the Czarist rule a rather large industrial sector developed in Estonia. For example, the Kreenholm Manufacturing Company was then the world's largest cotton mill.

=== Independence ===
After declaring independence in 1918, the Estonian War of Independence and the subsequent signing of the Treaty of Tartu in 1920, the new Estonian state inherited a ruined post-war economy and an inflated ruble currency. Despite considerable hardship, dislocation, and unemployment, Estonia spent the first decade of independence entirely transforming its economy. In 1918, The Czarist ruble was replaced by the Estonian mark, which was in circulation until 1927. By 1929, a stable currency, the kroon, had been established. It was issued by the Bank of Estonia, the country's central bank. Compensating the German landowners for their holdings, the government confiscated the estates and divided them into small farms, which subsequently formed the basis of Estonian prosperity. Trade focused on the local market and the West, particularly Germany and the United Kingdom. Only 3% of all commerce was with the USSR.

Historically, Estonia's economy was agricultural, modernising significantly post-independence from Russia in 1918. There was a notable knowledge sector in Tartu and expanding industrial sector, exemplified by the Kreenholm Manufacturing Company. Western European markets were familiar with Estonian dairy, with the main trade partners being Germany and the UK; only 3% of commerce was with the neighbouring USSR. Estonia and Finland had a similar standard of living. USSR's annexation of Estonia in 1940 and destruction during World War II crippled the economy. Post-war Sovietization continued, with the integration of Estonia's economy into the USSR's centrally-planned structure.

=== Soviet occupation ===
The USSR's forcible annexation of Estonia in 1940 and the ensuing Nazi and Soviet destruction during World War II crippled the Estonian economy. Post-war Soviet occupation and Sovietisation of life continued with the integration of Estonia's economy and industry into the USSR's centrally planned structure. More than 56% of Estonian farms were collectivised in the month of April 1949 alone after mass deportations to Siberia the previous month. Moscow expanded on those Estonian industries which had locally available raw materials, such as oil shale mining and phosphorites.

=== Restoration of independence, modernisation and liberalisation ===
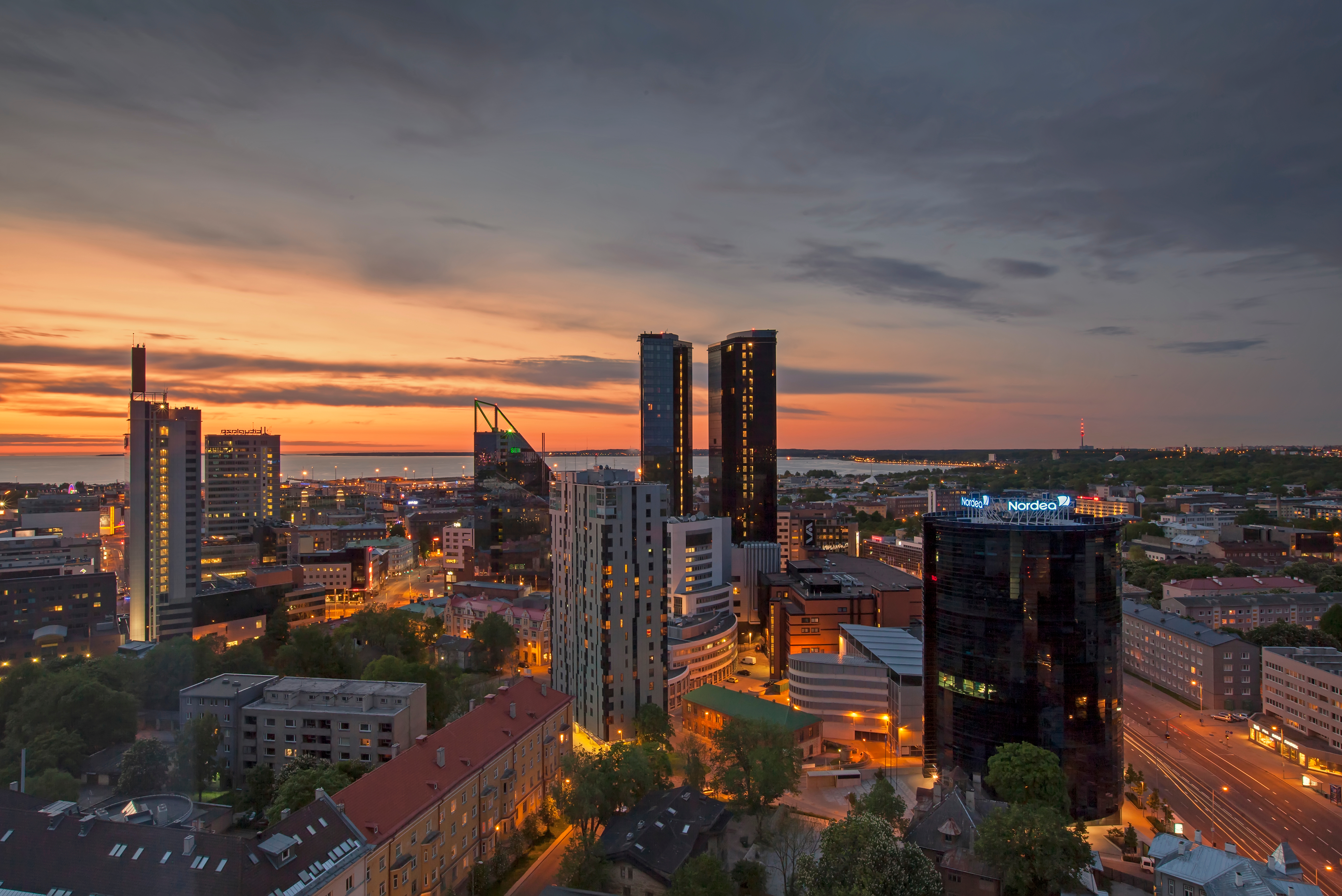
Maakri has become the central business district of Tallinn in the 21st century.

Real GDP per capita development of Estonia, Latvia and Lithuania

After Estonia restored its independence in 1991 and became a market economy, it emerged as a pioneer in the global economy. Estonia styled itself as a bridge between East and West, adopting significant economic reforms and technological innovations.

In June 1992, Estonia replaced the ruble with its own freely convertible currency, the kroon. A currency board was created and the new currency was pegged to the German Mark at the rate of 8 Estonian kroons per Deutsche Mark. When Germany introduced the euro the peg was changed to 15.6 kroons per euro.

In 1994, it became the first country in the world to adopt a flat tax, with a rate of 26% regardless of personal income. Between 2005 and 2008, this was reduced to 21% over several steps.

In early 1992, both liquidity problems and structural weakness stemming from the communist era precipitated a banking crisis. As a result, effective bankruptcy legislation was enacted and privately owned; well-managed banks emerged as market leaders. The fully electronic Tallinn Stock Exchange opened in early 1996, and was purchased by Finland's Helsinki Stock Exchange in 2001. Estonia joined the World Trade Organization in 1999.

From the early 2000s to the latter part of that decade, the economy experienced considerable growth. In 2000, Estonian GDP grew by 6.4%. After accession to the European Union in 2004, double-digit growth was soon observed. GDP grew by 8% in 2007 alone. Increases in labor costs, the imposition of tax on tobacco, alcohol, electricity, fuel, gas, and other external pressures (growing prices of oil and food on the global market) inflated prices in 2009.

=== 2008 financial crisis, response and recovery ===
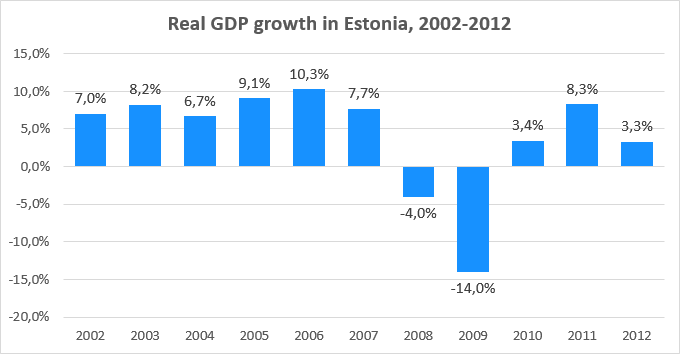
Real GDP growth in Estonia, 2002–2012

The 2008 financial crisis had a deep effect on the economy, primarily as a result of an investment and consumption slump, that followed the burst of the real estate market bubble that had been building up. In December 2008, Estonia became a donor country to the IMF-led rescue package for Latvia. In response to the crisis, the Ansip government opted for fiscal consolidation and retrenchment by maintaining fiscal discipline and a balanced budget in combination with austerity packages: The government increased taxes, and reduced public spending by slashing expenditures and public salaries across the board.

After a long period of very high growth of GDP, the GDP of Estonia decreased. In the first quarter 2008, GDP grew only 0.1%, and then decreased: negative growth was −1.4% in the 2nd quarter, a little over −3% (on a year-to-year basis) in the 3rd quarter, and −9.4% in the 4th quarter of that year.

The government made a supplementary negative budget, which was passed by the Riigikogu. The revenue of the budget was decreased for 2008 by EEK 6.1 billion and the expenditure by EEK 3.2 billion. A current account-deficit was extant, but began to shrink in late 2008. In 2009, the economy further contracted by 15% in the first quarter. Low domestic and foreign demand depressed the economy's overall output. The economy's 34% industrial production drop was the sharpest decrease in industrial production in the European Union. Estonia was one of the five worst-performing economies in the world in terms of annual growth, and had one of the highest rates of unemployment in the EU, which rose from 4% in May 2008 to 16% in May 2009.

In July 2009, the value-added tax was increased from 18% to 20%. The recorded budget deficit for 2009 was just 1.7% of GDP. The result was, that Estonia was one of only five EU countries in 2009 that met the Maastricht criteria for debt and deficit, and had the third-lowest deficit after Luxembourg and Sweden; Estonia did not ask for support from the IMF. Despite the third-largest drop in GDP, the country had the lowest budget deficit and lowest public debt among Central and Eastern European countries. In 2009, the Estonian economy began to rebound, and economic growth resumed in the second half of 2010. The country's unemployment rate dropped significantly to pre-recession levels. To top it off, Estonia was granted permission in 2010 to join the eurozone in 2011.

=== Joining the euro ===
Before joining the eurozone, the Estonian kroon had been pegged to the euro at a rate of 15.64664 EEK to one euro; before then, the kroon was pegged to the German mark at approximately 8 EEK to 1 DEM.

The design of Estonian euro coins was finalized in late 2004. Estonia's journey towards the euro took longer than originally projected, owing to the inflation rate continually being above the required 3% before 2010, which prevented the country from fulfilling the entry criteria. The country originally planned to adopt the euro on 1 January 2007 and officially changed its target date twice: first to 1 January 2008, and later to 1 January 2011.

On 12 May 2010, the European Commission announced that Estonia had met all criteria to join the eurozone. On 8 June 2010, EU finance ministers. In July 2010, Estonia received the final approval from ECOFIN to adopt the euro onwards from 1 January 2011; on that date Estonia became the 17th eurozone member state and circulated alongside the kroon until 14 January 2011. With that, Estonia became one of the first post-Soviet states to join the eurozone.

In August 2011, Standard & Poor's raised Estonia's credit rating from A to AA-. Among various factors, S&P cited as contributing to its decision was confidence in Estonia's ability to "sustain strong economic growth." Estonia's GDP growth rate in 2011 was above 8%, despite having negative population growth.

The Estonian economy was hit by the COVID-19 recession before bouncing back with an 8.6% rise in GDP in 2021, this was followed by the economic effect of the Russian invasion of Ukraine in February 2022 resulting in a fall in GDP of 1.3% in 2022 and high inflation which hit 24% before falling to single digits in 2023.

== The economy today ==
"Since reestablishing independence, Estonia has styled itself as the gateway between East and West and pursued economic reform and integration with the West." Estonia's market reforms put it among the economic leaders in the former COMECON area. A balanced budget, almost non-existent public debt, flat-rate income tax, free trade regime, adoption of the euro, competitive commercial banking sector, hospitable environment for foreign investment, innovative e-Services and mobile-based services are hallmarks of Estonia's free-market-based economy.

The privatisation of state-owned firms is virtually complete, with only the port and main power plants remaining in government hands. The constitution requires a balanced budget, and the protection afforded by Estonia's intellectual property laws is similar to that of the EU. Near-ideal conditions for the banking sector exist. Foreigners are not restricted from buying bank shares or acquiring majority holdings.

In 2013, the average monthly gross wage in Estonia was €980 (US$1,330). This figure has grown consistently to €2,213 (US$2,573) as of June 2025.

Estonia offers unique tax conditions for businesses, where the tax on undistributed profits is 0%. This allows companies that reinvest their profits into development to avoid tax obligations and allocate more funds for growth and expansion. In 2024, Estonia holds the first place in the International Tax Competitiveness Index and on a permanent basis is taking top positions in the Economic Freedom Index (8th place) and in the Ease of Doing Business Index (18th place).

== Projections and circular economy ==
In 2011, according to projections made by CEPII by 2050, Estonia could become the most productive country in the EU, after Luxembourg, and so join the top five most productive nations in the world.

According to the Ministry of Environment, Estonia committed to developing a circular economy strategic document and action plan by 2021. In March 2020, the Estonian Circular Economy Industries Association, specified that Estonia should consider the new European Green Deal and principles of circular economy when making investments to recover the economy after Covid.

== Employment participation ==
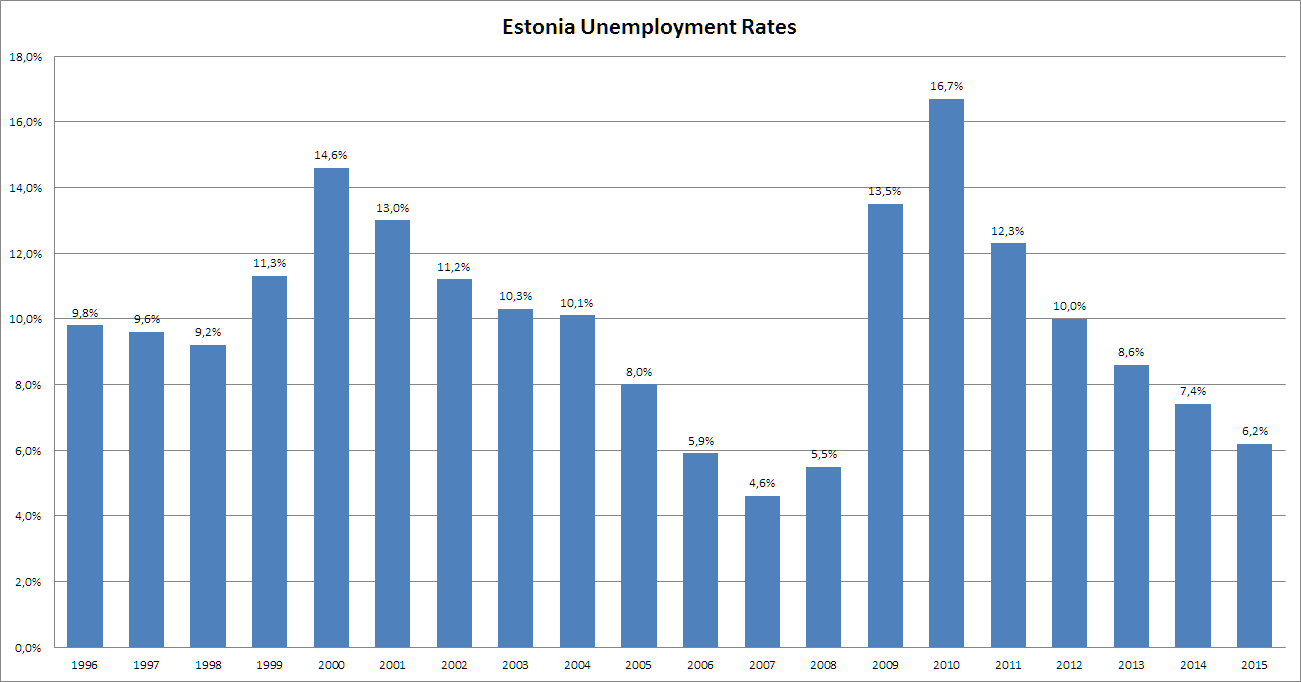
Unemployment rate as a percentage of the labor force in Estonia according to Statistics Estonia

Estonia has around 600,000 employees, yet the country has a shortage of skilled labor, and since skill shortages are experienced everywhere in Europe, the government has increased working visa quota for non-EEA citizens, although it has nevertheless been criticized for being inadequate for addressing the shortages.

The late-2000s recession in the world, the near-concurrent local property bust with changes in Estonian legislation to increase labour market flexibility (making it easier for companies to lay off workers) saw Estonia's unemployment rate shoot up to 18.8% throughout the duration of the crisis, then stabilise to 13.8% by summer 2011, as the economy recovered on the basis of strong exports. Internal consumption, and therefore imports, plummeted; and cuts were made in public finances. Some of the reduction in unemployment has been attributed to some Estonians' emigrating for employment to Finland, the UK, Australia, and elsewhere.

After the recession, the unemployment rate went lower, and throughout 2015 and 2016, the rate stayed near the levels that preceded the economic downturn, staying at just above 6%. In 2020-2023 the unemployment rate moved around between 5.2% and 7.7%.

== Sectors ==
Tallinn has emerged as the country's financial center. According to Invest in Estonia, advantages of Estonian financial sector are unbureaucratic cooperation between companies and authorities, and relative abundance of educated people although young educated Estonians tend to emigrate to western Europe for greater income. The largest banks are Swedbank, SEB Pank, and Nordea. Several IPOs have been made recently on the Tallinn Stock Exchange, a member OMX system.

The Estonian service sector employs over 60% of workforce. Estonia has a strong information technology (IT) sector, partly due to the Tiigrihüpe project undertaken in mid-1990s, and has been mentioned as the most "wired" and advanced country in Europe in the terms of e-government.

Farming, which had been forcibly collectivized for decades until the transition era of 1990–1992, has become privatized and more efficient, and the total farming area has increased in the period following Estonia's restoration of independence. The share of agriculture in the gross domestic product decreased from 15% to 3.3% during 1991–2000, while employment in agriculture decreased from 15% to 5.2%.

The mining industry makes up 1% of the GDP. Mined commodities include oil shale, peat, and industrial minerals, such as clays, limestone, sand and gravel. Soviets created badly polluting industry in the early 1950s, concentrated in the north-east of the country. Socialist economy and military areas left the country highly polluted, and mainly because of oil shale industry in Ida-Virumaa, sulfur dioxide emissions per person are almost as high as in the Czech Republic. The coastal seawater is polluted in certain locations, mainly the east. The government is looking for ways to reduce pollution further. In 2000, the emissions were 80% smaller than in 1980, and the amount of unpurified wastewater discharged to water bodies was 95% smaller than in 1980.

Estonian productivity is experiencing rapid growth, and consequently wages are also rising quickly, with a rise in private consumption of about 8% in 2005. According to Estonian Institute of Economic Research, the largest contributors to GDP growth in 2005 were processing industry, financial intermediation, retailing and wholesale trade, transport and communications.

=== Agriculture ===
Estonia produced in 2018:

- 450 thousand tons of wheat;
- 347 thousand tons of barley;
- 113 thousand tons of rapeseed;
- 88 thousand tons of potato;
- 78 thousand tons of oat;
- 53 thousand tons of pea;
- 29 thousand tons of rye;

In addition to smaller productions of other agricultural products.

=== Largest companies by revenue ===
Company	Revenue (EUR millions)
Eesti Energia	2218.2
Bolt Technology	1263.8
Eesti Gaas	1012.6
Orlen Eesti	958.0
Tallinna Kaubamaja	862.8
Tallink Grupp	771.4
Tavid	738.8
Olerex	637.7
Alexela	620.4
Graanul Invest	589.9

=== Largest companies by profit ===
Company	Profit (EUR millions)
Eesti Energia	215.7
Swedbank	206.7
State Forest Management Centre	138.4
Luminor Pank	124.7
SEB Pank	115.9
Graanul Invest	111.6
Eesti Gaas	95.2
Baltic Maritime Logistics Group	73.3
LHV Group	61.4
Telia Eesti	54.0

In 2022, the sector with the highest number of companies registered in Estonia is Services with 144,514 companies followed by Finance, Insurance, and Real Estate and Retail Trade with 47,001 and 26,635 companies respectively.

== Infrastructure ==
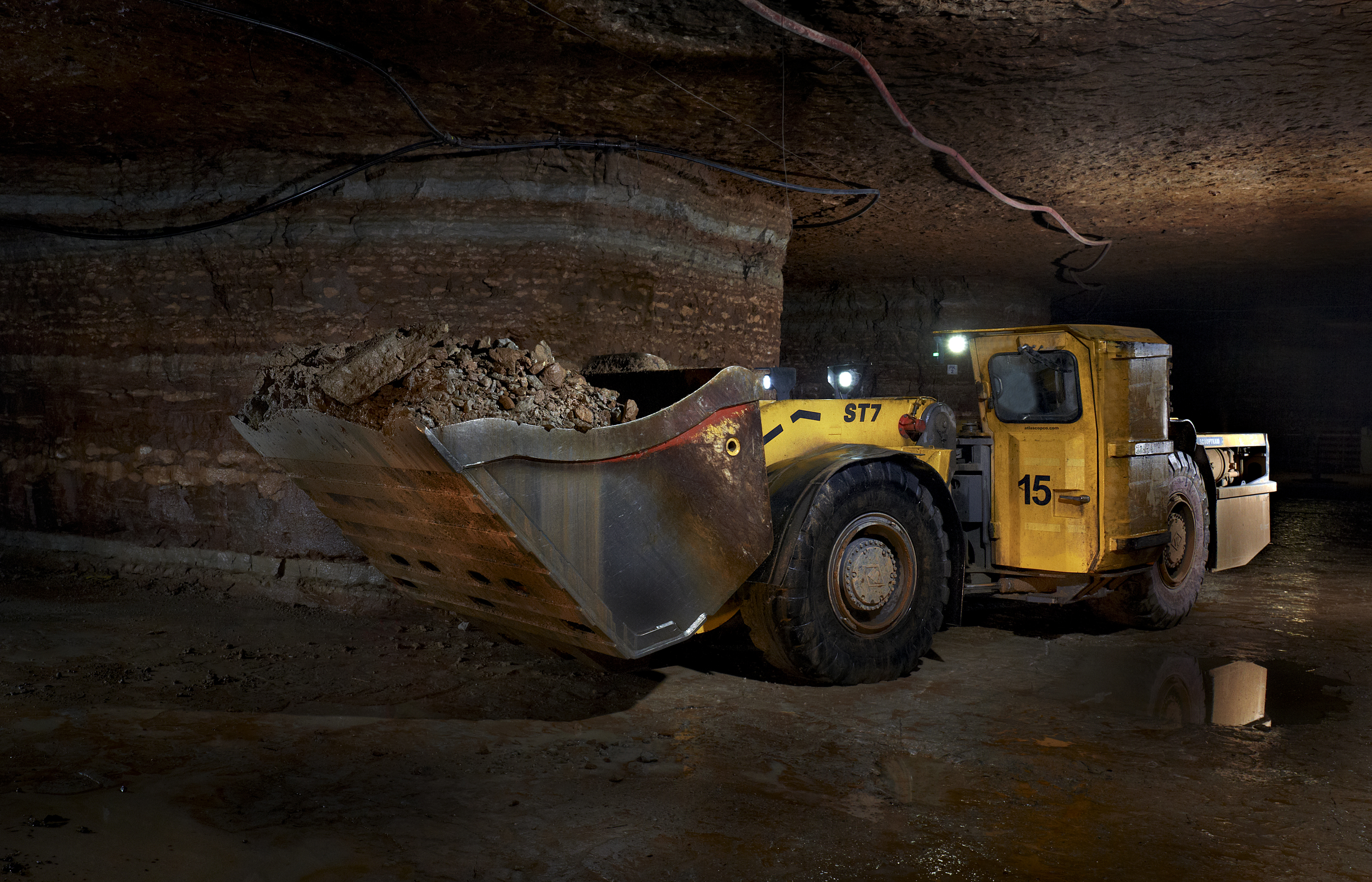
Oil shale supplies around 70% of the country's primary energy. Oil shale extraction in VKG Ojamaa mine.

Railway transport dominates the cargo sector, comprising 70% of all carried goods, domestic and international. Road transport is the one that prevails in the passenger sector, accounting for over 90% of all transported passengers. 5 major cargo ports offer easy navigational access, deep waters, and good ice conditions. There are 12 airports and 1 heliport in Estonia. Lennart Meri Tallinn Airport is the largest airport in Estonia, with 1,73 million passengers and 22,764 tons of cargo (annual cargo growth 119.7%) in 2007. International flight companies such as SAS, Finnair, Lufthansa, EasyJet, and Nordic Aviation Group provide direct flights to 27 destinations.

Approximately 7.5% of the country's workforce is employed in transportation and the sector contributes over 10% of GDP. Estonia is getting much business from traffic between European Union and Russia, especially oil cargo through Estonian ports. Transit trade's share of GDP is disputed, but many agree that Russia's increased hostility is decreasing the share.

Instead of coal, electricity is generated by burning oil shale, with largest stations in Narva. Oil shale supplies around 70% of the country's primary energy. Other energy sources are natural gas imported from Russia, wood, motor fuels, and fuel oils.

Wind power in Estonia amounts to 58.1 megawatts, whilst roughly 399 megawatts worth of projects are currently being developed. Estonian energy liberalization is lagging far behind the Nordic energy market. During the accession negotiations with the EU, Estonia agreed that at least 35% of the market are opened before 2009 and all of non-household market, which totals around 77% of consumption, before 2013. Estonia is concerned that Russia could use energy markets to bully it. In 2009, the government considered granting permits to nuclear power companies, and there were plans for a shared nuclear facility with Latvia and Lithuania. Those plans were shelved after the Fukushima Daiichi nuclear disaster in March 2011.

Estonia has high Internet penetration, and connections are available throughout most of the country.

== Trade ==
Exports of Estonia by product category (2019) Chemical products Transportation Machines Mineral products Plastics and rubbers Metals Foodstuffs Precious metals Textiles Instruments Animal products Vegetable products Paper goods Footwear and headwear Miscellaneous Stone and glass Wood products Animal and vegetable bi-products Animal hides Arts and antiques Weapons

Estonia exports electrical equipment (14% of all exports annually), wood and wooden articles (11% of all exports annually), food and agricultural products (11% of all exports annually), mineral products (10% of all exports annually), and transport equipment (10% of all exports annually). Estonia imports electrical and transport equipment (26% of all imports annually, 13% each), mineral products (12% of all imports annually), food and agricultural products (11% of all imports annually), machinery and mechanical appliances (10% of all imports annually).

Country	Export	Import
Finland	17%	15%
Latvia	12%	11%
Sweden	9%	8%
Lithuania	8%	10%
Germany	7%	12%
Netherlands	4%	6%

== Natural resources ==
Resource	Location	Reserves
Oil shale	north-east	1,137,700,000 mln t
Sea mud (medical)	south	1,356,400,000 mln t
Construction sand	across the country	166,700,000 mln m^{3}
Construction gravel	north	32,800,000 mln m^{3}
Lake mud (medical)	across the country	1,133,300 mln t
Lake mud (fertilizer)	east	170,900 t
Ceramic clay	across the country	10,600,000 mln m^{3}
Ceramsid clay (for gravel)	across the country	2,600,000 mln m^{3}
Technological dolomite	west	16,600,000 mln m^{3}
Technological limestone	north	13,800,000 mln m^{3}
Decoration dolomite	west	2,900,000 mln m^{3}
Construction dolomite	west	32,900,000 mln m^{3}
Blue clay	across the country	2,044,000 mln t
Granite	across the country	1,245,100,000 mln m^{3}
Peat	across the country	230,300,000 mln t
Construction limestone	north	110,300,000 mln m^{3}
Limestone cement	north	9,400,000 mln m^{3}
Clay cement	north	15,6000,000 mln m^{3}
Graptolitic argillite	north	64,000,000,000 mln t
Wood	across the country	15,6000,000 mln m^{3}
Technological sand	north	3,300,000 mln m^{3}
Lake lime	north and south	808,000 t
Phosphorite	north	over 350,000,000 mln t (estimated)
Subsoil	across the country	21,1 km^{3}

== Data ==
The following table shows the main economic indicators in 1993–2026.

Year	GDP (in bn. US$ PPP)	GDP per capita (in US$ PPP)	GDP (in bn. US$ nominal)	GDP growth (real)	Inflation rate (in Percent)	Unemployment (in Percent)	Government debt (in % of GDP)
1993	11.8	7,860	1.8	n/a	n/a	6.5%	n/a
1994	▲11.8	▲8,080	▲2.5	▼−1.6%	▲47.7%	▲7.5%	n/a
1995	▲12.3	▲8,595	▲3.9	▲2.2%	▲29.0%	▲9.6%	9%
1996	▲13.2	▲9,322	▲4.8	▲4.9%	▲19.8%	▲9.9%	▼7%
1997	▲15.2	▲10,843	▲5.2	▲13.1%	▲9.3%	▼9.6%	▼6%
1998	▲16.0	▲11,551	▲5.7	▲4.3%	▲8.8%	▲9.8%	▼5%
1999	▲16.2	▲11,631	▲5.8	▼−0.4%	▲3.1%	▲12.2%	▲6%
2000	▲18.2	▲13,031	▼5.7	▲10.1%	▲3.9%	▲14.6%	▼5%
2001	▲19.7	▲14,198	▲6.3	▲5.9%	▲5.6%	▼13.0%	5%
2002	▲21.4	▲15,516	▲7.4	▲6.9%	▲3.6%	▼11.2%	▲6%
2003	▲23.5	▲17,131	▲9.9	▲7.6%	▲1.4%	▼10.3%	6%
2004	▲25.8	▲18,901	▲12.2	▲6.8%	▲3.0%	▼10.1%	▼5%
2005	▲29.1	▲21,473	▲14.1	▲9.5%	▲4.1%	▼8.0%	5%
2006	▲32.9	▲24,439	▲17.0	▲9.8%	▲4.4%	▼5.9%	5%
2007	▲36.4	▲27,125	▲22.5	▲7.6%	▲6.7%	▼4.6%	▼4%
2008	▼35.2	▼26,301	▲24.4	▼−5.1%	▲10.6%	▲5.5%	▲5%
2009	▼30.2	▼22,636	▼19.7	▼−14.6%	▲0.2%	▲13.5%	▲8%
2010	▲31.3	▲23,525	▼19.6	▲2.4%	▲2.7%	▲16.7%	8%
2011	▲34.4	▲25,916	▲23.3	▲7.6%	▲5.1%	▼12.3%	8%
2012	▲36.3	▲27,466	▼23.3	▲3.7%	▲4.2%	▼10.0%	▲11%
2013	▲37.6	▲28,525	▲25.5	▲1.8%	▲3.2%	▼8.6%	11%
2014	▲39.5	▲30,047	▲27.1	▲3.3%	▲0.5%	▼7.4%	▲12%
2015	▲40.6	▲30,882	▼23.3	▲1.8%	▲0.1%	▼6.2%	▼11%
2016	▲42.3	▲32,130	▲24.6	▲3.1%	▲0.8%	▲6.8%	▼10%
2017	▲45.5	▲34,507	▲27.5	▲5.6%	▲3.7%	▼5.8%	▼9%
2018	▲49.1	▲37,121	▲31.2	▲3.7%	▲3.4%	▼5.4%	9%
2019	▲53.9	▲40,586	▲31.9	▲3.7%	▲2.3%	▼4.4%	9%
2020	▲54.1	▲40,672	▼31.8	▼−2.9%	▼−0.6%	▲6.8%	▲19%
2021	▲60.0	▲45,059	▲37.2	▲8.3%	▲4.5%	▼6.2%	▼18%
2022	▲63.4	▲47,039	▲38.3	▼−1.2%	▲19.4%	▼5.6%	▲19%
2023	▲64.0	▼46,699	▲41.5	▼−2.7%	▲9.1%	▲6.4%	▲20%
2024	▲65.5	▲47,743	▲43.1	▼−0.1%	▲3.7%	▲7.5%	▲24%
2025	▲67.8	▲49,492	▲47.0	▲0.6%	▲4.8%	▼7.4%	24%
2026	▲70.7	▲51,653	▲51.6	▲1.4%	▲3.8%	▼7.3%	▲28%

Gross domestic product per capita by county.

	GDP per capita, euros
County	2023
Whole country	27,868.5
Harju county	36,709.5
..Tallinn	41,916.7
Hiiu county	18,034.7
Ida-Viru county	19,678.1
Jõgeva county	16,973.3
Järva county	19,483.0
Lääne county	16,022.8
Lääne-Viru county	18,277.6
Põlva county	14,623.7
Pärnu county	18,889.2
Rapla county	15,946.1
Saare county	17,084.9
Tartu county	27,021.8
..Tartu city	32,183.3
Valga county	14,592.1
Viljandi county	19,320.5
Võru county	16,664.2

== See also ==
- Banking in Estonia
