= International status and usage of the euro =

Worldwide use of the euro and U.S. dollar: Eurozone External adopters of the euro Currencies pegged to the euro Currencies pegged to the euro within narrow band United States External adopters of the U.S. dollar Currencies pegged to the U.S. dollar Currencies pegged to the U.S. dollar within narrow band

A clickable Euler diagram showing the relationships between various European regional organisations

The euro, which is the currency of the European Union member states in the eurozone, has been used internationally since its launch in 1999. On 1 January 2002, when the currency formally replaced 12 currencies of the original eurozone states, its usage was inherited in territories such as Montenegro which had used pre-euro currencies, while other minor currencies tied to pre-euro currencies were also replaced by the euro, such as in Monaco. Four small states have been given a formal right to use the euro, and to mint their own coins, but all other usage outside the eurozone has been unofficial. With or without an agreement, these countries, unlike those in the eurozone, do not participate in the European Central Bank or the Eurogroup.

Its growing use in this regard has led to its becoming the only significant challenger to the U.S. dollar as the world's main reserve currency.

== International adoption ==
=== Sovereign states ===
State	Adopted euro	Issuing rights	Pop.
Andorra	1 January 1999 (de facto) (Note: Between 1 January 1999, when the euro was launched, and 1 April 2012, when their Monetary Agreement with the EU came into force, Andorra did not have an official currency but used the euro as their de facto currency.); 1 April 2012 (de jure)	1 July 2013	87,486
Monaco	1 January 1999	1 January 2002	38,423
San Marino	1 January 1999	1 January 2002	34,042
Vatican City	1 January 1999	1 January 2002	882

Several European microstates outside the EU have adopted the euro as their currency. For EU sanctioning of this adoption, a monetary agreement must be concluded. Prior to the launch of the euro, agreements were reached with Monaco, San Marino, and Vatican City by EU member states (Italy in the case of San Marino and Vatican City, and France in the case of Monaco) allowing them to use the euro and mint a limited amount of euro coins (with their own national symbols on the obverse side) to be valid throughout the eurozone. However, they cannot print banknotes. All of these states had previously had monetary agreements to use yielded eurozone currencies. San Marino and Vatican City had their currencies pegged to the Italian lira (Vatican and Sammarinese lira) and Monaco used the Monegasque franc, which was pegged to the French franc. Between 2010 and 2012, new agreements between the EU and Monaco, San Marino, and the Vatican City came into force.

A similar agreement was negotiated with Andorra and came into force on 1 April 2012. Andorra did not previously have an official currency. Prior to 1999, it used both the French franc and Spanish peseta as de facto legal tender currencies, though they never had an official monetary arrangement with either country, and switched to the euro (without any monetary agreement) when it was introduced on 1 January 2002. After years of negotiations, partially over concerns with banking secrecy, the EU and Andorra signed a monetary agreement on 30 June 2011 which made the euro the official currency in Andorra and allowed them to mint their own euro coins as early as 1 July 2013, provided they comply with the agreement's terms. However, the first Andorran euro coins did not enter into circulation until January 2015.

Eurozone participation European Union member states (special territories not shown) 21 in the eurozone 1 in ERM II, with an opt-out (Denmark) 5 not in ERM II, but committed to join the eurozone after meeting the convergence criteria (Czech Republic, Hungary, Poland, Romania, and Sweden) Non–EU member states 4 using the euro with a monetary agreement (Andorra, Monaco, San Marino, and Vatican City) 2 using the euro unilaterally (Kosovo and Montenegro)

=== Dependent territories outside the EU ===
Outside the EU, there are currently three French territories and a British territory that have agreements to use the euro as their currency. All other dependent territories of eurozone member states that have opted not to be a part of EU, usually with Overseas Country and Territory (OCT) status, use local currencies which are often pegged to the euro or U.S. dollar. As non-sovereign entities, dependent territories which have adopted the euro are not permitted to mint euro coins like the European microstates, nor do they get a seat at the European Central Bank (ECB) or the Eurogroup. France is responsible for ensuring that the laws governing the EMU are applied in territories of theirs using the euro.

The first OCTs to adopt the euro through a monetary agreement were the French overseas territories of Saint-Pierre-et-Miquelon, located off the coast of Canada, and Mayotte in the Indian Ocean. They both adopted the euro on 1 January 1999 when the currency was first introduced at the electronic level. Mayotte subsequently held a referendum in 2009 in which it decided to become an integral part of France. Its status was changed from an OCT to an OMR, where EU laws apply without separate agreements, on 1 January 2014, which rendered the previous monetary agreement unnecessary.

On 22 February 2007, Saint Barthélemy and Saint Martin were politically separated from the French Outermost region (OMR) Guadeloupe to form two new French overseas collectivities. This caused their status in the EU to briefly enter legal limbo, until ratification of the Treaty of Lisbon reaffirmed that both territories were part of the EU. The euro continued to be used in both territories throughout this period without incident. When Saint Barthélemy subsequently became an overseas territory of the European Union on 1 January 2012, changing its status to an OCT, the territory had to sign a monetary agreement to continue using the euro.

With the adoption of the euro by Cyprus on 1 January 2008, the Sovereign Base Areas of Akrotiri and Dhekelia, which had previously used the Cypriot pound, also decided to adopt the euro. The base areas are an overseas territory of the United Kingdom and under military jurisdiction. Even when the UK was an EU member state, the base areas were not considered part of the EU. The euro was instead adopted to align the base areas with the laws and currency of the Republic of Cyprus.

	Territories outside EU	Adopted euro	Agreement	Pop.	Notes
(United Kingdom)	Akrotiri and Dhekelia	1 January 2008	7 August 2007	18,195	UK dependent territory. Replaced the Cypriot pound with the euro along with Cyprus.
(Saint Pierre and Miquelon)	Saint Pierre and Miquelon	1 January 1999	31 December 1998	5,819	An OCT of France.
(French Southern and Antarctic Lands)	French Southern and Antarctic Lands	1 January 1999		400~800	An OCT of France.
(Saint Barthélemy)	Saint-Barthélemy	1 January 1999	12 July 2011	10,967	Agreement entered into force on 1 January 2012 when the territory's status changed from an OMR to an OCT.

=== Unilateral adopters ===
State/Territory	Adopted	Seeking	Notes	Pop.
Kosovo	1 January 2002 (Note: The Deutsche Mark was declared by UNMIK as legal tender in Kosovo on 4 October 1999. When Germany yielded the Deutsche Mark for the euro on 1 January 2002, this also happened in Kosovo. Subsequently the Republic of Kosovo unilaterally adopted the euro as its official currency.)	EU membership	Potential candidate	1,585,566
Montenegro	1 January 2002 (Note: Montenegro abandoned the use of the Yugoslav dinar in November 1999. Since then, the Deutsche Mark was used as legal tender. When Germany yielded the Deutsche Mark for the euro on 1 January 2002, Montenegro unilaterally adopted the euro as its official currency.)	EU membership	Candidate	623,327

Montenegro and Kosovo have also used the euro since its launch, as they previously used the German mark instead of the Yugoslav dinar in Serbia and Montenegro. Unlike the states above, they do not have a formal agreement with the EU to use the euro as their currency, and have never minted marks or euros; rather, they depend on bills and coins already in circulation.

Due to concerns that Serbia could use the dinar to destabilise Kosovo and Montenegro (the latter was in a political union with Serbia until 2006), both received Western help in adopting and using the mark (though there was no restriction on the use of the dinar or any other currency). They switched to the euro when the mark was replaced. In North Kosovo, mainly populated by the Serbian minority, the Serbian dinar, which replaced the Yugoslav dinar, continues to be used despite its lack of recognition or use elsewhere in Kosovo.

The use of the euro in Montenegro and Kosovo has helped stabilise their economies, and for this reason the adoption of the euro by small states has been encouraged by former Finance Commissioner Joaquín Almunia. Former European Central Bank president Jean-Claude Trichet stated that the ECB – which does not grant representation to those who unilaterally adopt the euro – neither supports nor deters those wishing to use the currency.

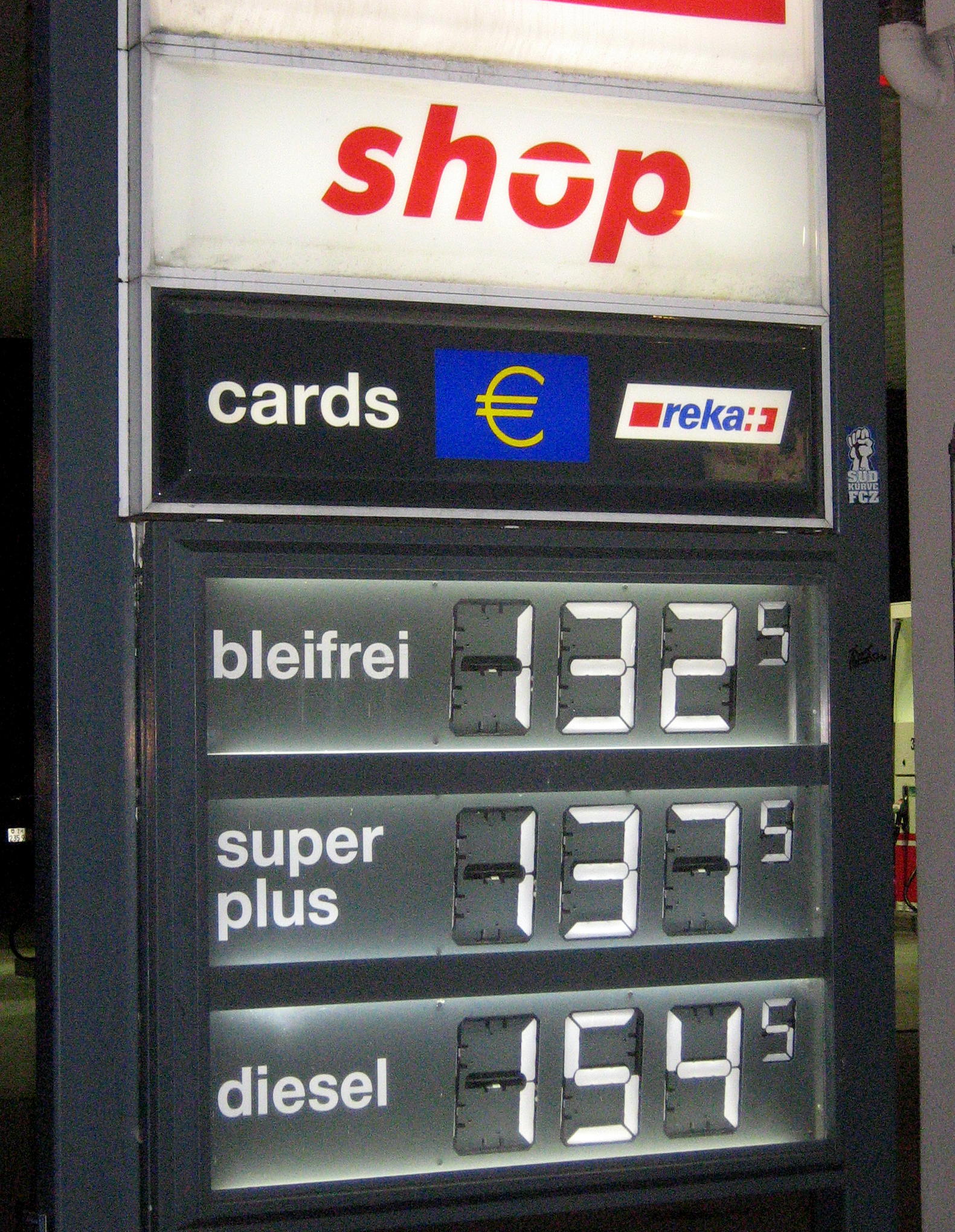
This Swiss petrol station accepts payment in euros

== Usage in states with another official currency ==
In various countries, the euro is accepted by some merchants despite not being the official currency there. Additionally, it is sometimes used for pricing purposes even when actual payments are made in the official currency (e.g., for real estate).

=== EU members outside the Eurozone ===
The euro is often accepted in shops in countries neighboring the Eurozone, like the border areas and capitals of Poland, the Czech Republic, Hungary, Romania, Denmark and Sweden, which are near to Eurozone member countries like Germany, Austria, Slovenia, Slovakia, Croatia, Bulgaria and Finland; the border areas of Switzerland, which is almost entirely surrounded by Eurozone member countries except for Liechtenstein, which also uses the Swiss franc.

Also, a large number of petrol stations and motorway service areas in European countries outside the eurozone accept euros, and Poland (as well as non-EU members Bosnia and Herzegovina and Serbia) allow payment of highway tolls in euros.

The euro is explicitly included in some laws in non-Eurozone countries, including EEA countries, based on EU directives. The laws, for example in money laundering, include specific euro amounts above which certain rules apply.

In some areas of New Caledonia and French Polynesia, both non-EU territories of an EU member state (France), euro payments can be accepted, alongside the territorial CFP Franc.

=== United Kingdom ===
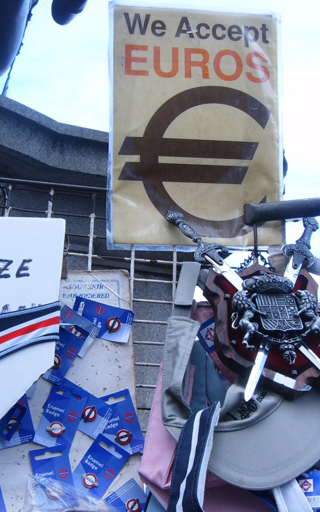
Sign at a London souvenir stall, stating that payment in euros is accepted

Some tourist-oriented shops in the United Kingdom accept the euro. In Northern Ireland, which shares a land border with the eurozone, the euro is accepted in some shops, including many chain stores.

=== Northern Cyprus ===
The application of EU law and treaties to Northern Cyprus is currently suspended. Its territory is claimed by the Republic of Cyprus, one of the EU member states, but is under the control of the Turkish Republic of Northern Cyprus (TRNC). The TRNC is not recognised by the Republic of Cyprus, the European Union, or by any country other than Turkey. EU law would start to apply in Northern Cyprus if it came under control of the Republic of Cyprus (if the Cyprus dispute were resolved through unification), whose official legal tender is the euro.

Presently, the TRNC government has declared the Turkish lira to be its legal tender. The euro (along with other major currencies, such as the U.S. dollar and British pound) can be used to pay for goods and services in many shops associated with or situated near tourist hotspots, as well as some major supermarkets. However, the exchange rate used by these businesses may not always reflect the true value of the currencies involved. Cypriot euro coins, using both Greek and Turkish languages, have been designed to avoid any bias towards any particular area of the island, in keeping with both Greek and Turkish being the official languages of the Republic of Cyprus. Some in northern Cyprus have called for the unilateral adoption of the euro.

=== Zimbabwe ===
From April 2009 to June 2019, the Zimbabwean dollar was no longer in active use after it was officially suspended by the government due to hyperinflation. The United States dollar (US$), South African rand (R), Botswanan pula (P), pound sterling (£), euro (€), Indian rupee (₹), Australian dollar (A$), Chinese yuan (元/¥), and Japanese yen (¥) were used instead, along with U.S.-cent denominated Zimbabwean bond coins and bond notes.

== Trading currency ==
In 1998, Cuba announced that it would replace the U.S. dollar with the euro as its official currency for the purposes of international trading. On 1 December 2002, North Korea did the same. (Its internal currency, the wŏn, is not convertible and thus cannot be used to purchase foreign goods. The euro also enjoys popularity domestically, especially among elites and resident foreigners.) Syria followed suit in 2006.

Since 2007, Iran has asked all petroleum customers to pay in non-U.S. dollar currency in response to American sanctions. This has resulted in the Iranian oil bourse trading in several currencies, predominantly the euro for European trade, and either the yen or euros for sales in Asia.

In 2018, in response to U.S. sanctions, the Venezuelan Minister of Industries and National Production Tareck El Aissami announced that all foreign exchange government auctions will no longer be quoted in U.S. dollars and would use euros, Chinese yuan and other hard currencies instead. El Aissami said the government would open bank accounts in Europe and Asia as potential workarounds to financial sanctions. In addition, Venezuela's banking sector will now be able to participate in currency auctions three times a week, adding that the government would sell some 2 billion euros amid a rebound in oil prices.

== Pegged currencies ==
Currently, there are several currencies pegged to the euro, some with fluctuation bands around a central rate and others with no fluctuations allowed around the central rate. This can be seen as a safety measure, especially for currencies of areas with weak economies. The euro is seen as a stable currency, i.e., there are no dramatic appreciations or depreciations of its value that might suddenly damage the economy or harm trade. Thus it provides security to traders and people holding that currency.

Flag(s)	State	Pop.	Area (km^{2})	Code	Currency	Central rate	Pegged since	Fluctuation band	Formerly pegged to	EMU
(Bosnia and Herzegovina)	Bosnia and Herzegovina	3,475,000 (2020 est.)	51,129	BAM	Bosnia and Herzegovina convertible mark	1.95583	1 January 1999	0.00%	DEM (from 21 November 1995)	
(Cape Verde)	Cabo Verde	561,901 (2021 cs.)	4,033	CVE	Cape Verdean escudo	110.265	1 January 1999	0.00%	PTE (from middle of 1998)	
(Comoros)	Comoros	850,886 (2019 est.)	2,170	KMF	Comorian franc	491.96775	1 January 1999	0.00%	FRF (from 23 November 1979)	
(Denmark)	Denmark	5,935,619 (2023 est.)	43,094	DKK	Danish krone	7.46038	1 January 1999	2.25% (de facto 0.5%)	XEU	ERM II
(Morocco)	Morocco (inc. Western Sahara)	37,984,655 (2022 est.)	712,550	MAD	Moroccan dirham (through a basket of currencies)	≈ 11	1 January 1999	–		
(North Macedonia)	North Macedonia	1,836,713 (2021 est.)	25,713	MKD	Macedonian denar	≈ 61	1 January 1999		DEM (from October 1995)	
(São Tomé and Príncipe)	São Tomé and Príncipe	220,372 (2023 est.)	1,001	STN	São Tomé and Príncipe dobra	24.5	1 January 2010	0.00%		
(Cameroon) (Central African Republic) (Chad) (Equatorial Guinea) (Gabon) (Republic of the Congo)	XAF currency union; Cameroon; Central African Republic; Chad; Equatorial Guinea; Gabon; Republic of the Congo	64,023,929 (30,135,732; 5,552,228; 18,523,165; 1,737,943; 2,397,368; 5,677,493 (2023 est.))	2,757,528	XAF	Central African CFA franc	655.957	1 January 1999	0.00%	FRF (from 17 October 1948)	
(Benin) (Burkina Faso) (Guinea-Bissau) (Ivory Coast) (Mali) (Niger) (Senegal) (Togo)	XOF currency union; Benin; Burkina Faso; Guinea-Bissau; Ivory Coast; Mali; Niger; Senegal; Togo	141,244,341 (14,214,095; 22,489,126; 2,078,820; 29,344,847; 21,359,722; 25,396,840; 18,383,658; 8,703,961 (2023 est.))	3,269,077	XOF	West African CFA franc	655.957	1 January 1999	0.00%	FRF (from 17 October 1948)	
(French Polynesia) (France) (Wallis and Futuna)	XPF currency union; French Polynesia; New Caledonia; Wallis and Futuna	561,751 (278,786; 271,407; 11,558 (2022/ 2019/ 2018 census))	19,597	XPF	CFP franc	119.331742	1 January 1999	0.00%	FRF (from 21 October 1949)	

As part of ERM II, Danish krone has committed to a tight fluctuation band of ±2.25%.

Of the rest of the listed currencies, the Bosnia and Herzegovina convertible mark maintains a fixed exchange rate through the currency board system; the Central African CFA franc, the West African CFA franc, the CFP franc, the Cape Verdean escudo, the Comorian franc, and the São Tomé and Príncipe dobra maintain a conventional fixed exchange rate; the Macedonian denar uses a stabilized arrangement; and the Moroccan dirham is pegged to the euro through a basket of currencies. Other countries that, as of December 2024, have exchange rate regimes linked to the euro are Romania, Serbia, Albania, Singapore, Botswana, Tunisia, Samoa, Fiji, Libya, Kuwait, Syria, China and Vanuatu.

Since 2005, stamps issued by the Sovereign Military Order of Malta have been denominated in euros, although the Order's official currency remains the Maltese scudo. The Maltese scudo itself is pegged to the euro and is only recognised as legal tender within the Order.

In 2011, the Swiss franc was rapidly appreciating against the euro, harming its exports to the eurozone. In response, Switzerland implemented a cap to the Swiss franc's value. This was not so much a peg, as they were merely limiting its highest value and not its lowest. In 2015, Switzerland announced that it was going to scrap its currency peg to the euro.

== Reserve currency status ==
The percental composition of currencies of official foreign exchange reserves from 1995 to 2025.

The euro is a major global reserve currency, the second most widely held international reserve currency after the U.S. dollar. Inheriting this status from the German mark, its share of international reserves has risen from 23.65% in 2002 to a peak of 27.66% in 2009 before declining due to the Euro area crisis, with Russia and Eastern Europe being the most significant users.

The possibility of the euro becoming the first international reserve currency was widely discussed before 2009. Former Federal Reserve Chairman Alan Greenspan gave his opinion in September 2007 that the euro could indeed replace the U.S. dollar as the world's primary reserve currency. He said it is "absolutely conceivable that the euro will replace the dollar as reserve currency, or will be traded as an equally important reserve currency."

As of 2021, however, the euro has not displaced the U.S. dollar as primary reserve currency due to the Euro area crisis. The euro's stability and future existence was doubted and its share of global reserves fell to 19% by year-end 2015 (compared to 66% for the U.S. dollar). As of year-end 2020, these figures stand at 21% for the euro and 59% for the U.S. dollar.

== See also ==
- Dollarisation
- International use of the U.S. dollar
- Internationalization of the renminbi
- Central banks and currencies of Africa
- Central banks and currencies of the Caribbean
- Reserve currency
