= Estonian mark =

Currency of Estonia between 1918 and 1927

Eesti mark (Estonian)
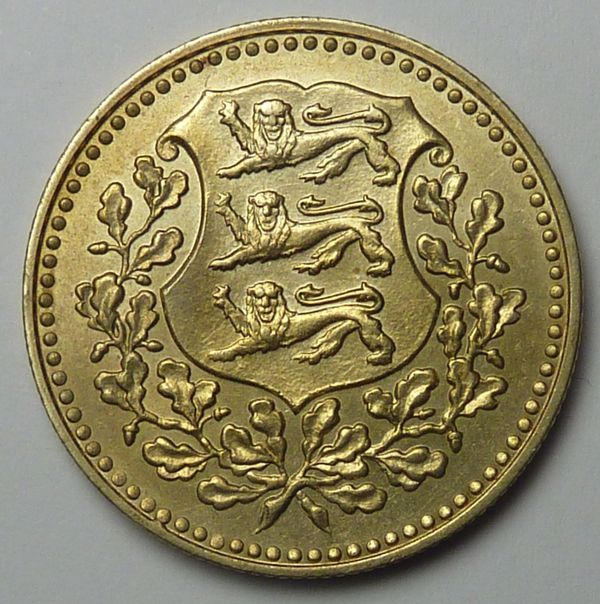
5-mark coin
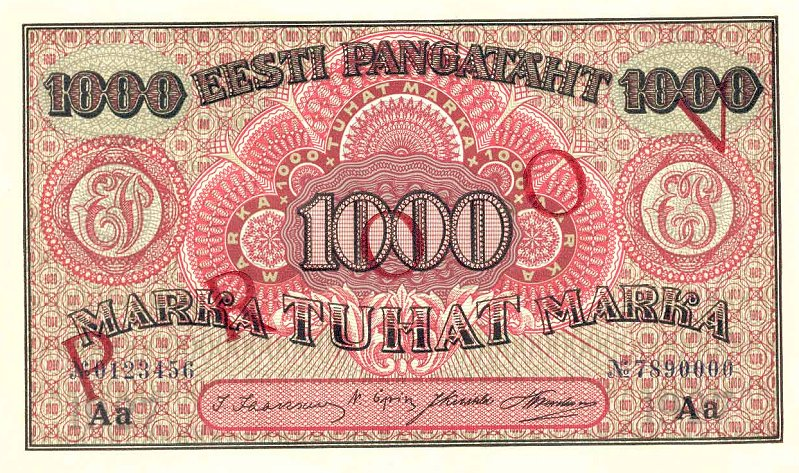
1000-mark note

Unit
- Plural: marki (Estonian partitive sg.)
- Symbol: EEM

Denominations
- Subunit
- 1/100: penn
- Plural
- penn: penni (Estonian partitive sg.)
- Banknotes
- Freq. used: 5, 10, 20, 50 penni; 1, 3, 5, 10, 25, 50, 100, 500, 1000, 5000 marki
- Coins
- Freq. used: 1, 3, 5, 10 marki

Demographics
- Date of introduction: 30 November 1918
- Replaced: German ostmark (ℳ); 1 ℳ = 1 EEM
- Date of withdrawal: 31 August 1928
- Replaced by: Estonian kroon (EEK); 100 EEM = 1 EEK
- User(s): None, previously: Estonia

Issuance
- Central bank: Bank of Estonia
- Website: www.eestipank.ee
- This infobox shows the latest status before this currency was rendered obsolete.

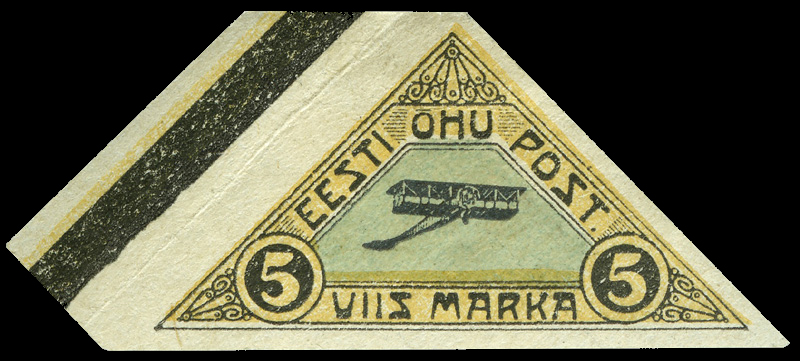
Estonian stamp denominated in marks, 1920

The Estonian mark (Estonian: Eesti mark) was the currency of Estonia between 1918 and 1928. It was circulating parallel with payment notes from the Clearing House of Tallinn as there was a lack of cash in Estonia. The last available payment notes were exchanged for marks in 1923. On 11 November 1918 the Estonian Provisional Government assembled after the Armistice to discuss, among other issues, financial questions and on 30 November 1918 the Provisional Government agreed to establish the Estonian mark. The currency was modeled after Germany, as Estonian finances were influenced by German law in 1918. It was initially equivalent to the German ostmark, which had been circulating alongside the Imperial rouble since the German occupation. It was divided into 100 penns (in Nominative case: penn).

Until 1919 there were also Russian rubles, German ostrubels and Finnish marks in circulation.

The first marks were printed in Estonia and Finland in different denominations and there were different types. These were released first to public use in spring 1919 by the Bank of Estonia, as, starting on 30 April 1919, they were the only institution with the right to issue banknotes in Estonia. Initially the mark was a cash register note (Estonian: kassatäht). In 1922 an exchange note (Estonian: vahetustäht) came into circulation that as per regulations, government institutions and agencies were obliged to accept in unlimited quantities and private institutions and persons up to 2000 marks with each payment. Finally, Bank of Estonia banknotes (Estonian: pangatäht) were released that were fully covered by the "bank's assets and pawned assets in the bank's possession".

At the time of the mark's initial introduction, the Estonian government attempted to back the currency up with real collateral but after this failed, the mark became just paper currency without cover. Due to the economical situation, the mark's high inflation and the depletion of gold reserves, the state initiated steps to organize a monetary reform to stabilize the situation. The mark was replaced in 1924 in foreign trade and 1928 in daily use by the Estonian kroon at a rate of 1 kroon = 100 marka. As there had not been enough kroon banknotes printed by 1928, the final series of 100 mark cash register notes were overprinted with the text "one kroon" (Estonian: ÜKS KROON)

== Coins ==
Coins were issued in denominations of 1, 3, 5, and 10 marka between 1922 and 1926. The 1922 issues were struck in cupro-nickel whilst the later issues were in nickel-bronze.

== Banknotes ==
In 1919, treasury notes ("kassatäht") were issued in denominations of 5, 10, 20, and 50 pennies, 1, 3, 5, 10, 25, 50, and 100 marks ("pangatäht"). Later, treasury notes were issued in denominations up to 1,000 marks, along with banknotes up to 5,000 marks. Exchange notes ("vahetustäht") were also issued, in 1922, in denominations of 10 and 25 marks.

== See also ==
Preceded by: Finnish markka Reason: independence	Currency of Estonia; 1918 – 1928	Succeeded by: Estonian kroon (1st); Reason: high inflation Ratio: 1 kroon = 100 marka
Preceded by: German ostmark Reason: independence	Currency of Estonia; 1918 – 1928	Succeeded by: Estonian kroon (1st); Reason: high inflation Ratio: 1 kroon = 100 marka
Preceded by: Imperial Russian rouble Reason: independence	Currency of Estonia; 1918 – 1928	Succeeded by: Estonian kroon (1st); Reason: high inflation Ratio: 1 kroon = 100 marka
