= Song festival =

Song festival can refer to a number of song contests or festivals:

- Eurovision Song Contest, annual music competition
- Sanremo Music Festival
- ABU Song Festival (disambiguation), various song festivals and contests organized by the Asia-Pacific Broadcasting Union (ABU)
- Baltic song festivals:
  - Estonian Song Festival
  - Latvian Song and Dance Festival
  - Lithuanian Song and Dance Festival
- Little song festivals, events for minors:
  - Dainų dainelė, in Lithuania
  - Lilla Melodifestivalen in Sweden

== See also ==
- Song Contest (disambiguation)
