= Song Celebration Museum =

Museum in Tartu, Estonia

Coordinates: 58.3865°N 26.7325°E

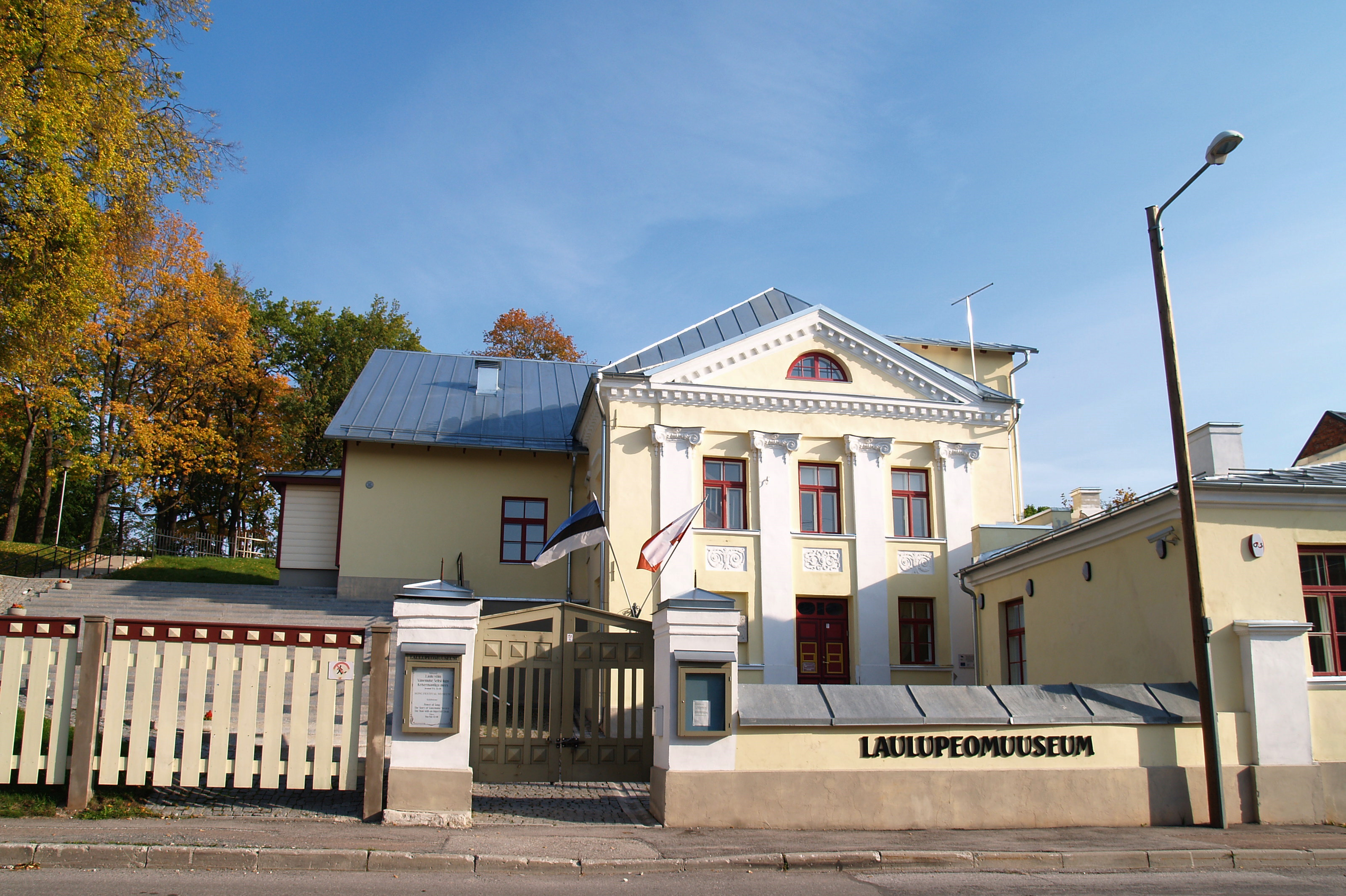
Image of Song Celebration Museum

The Song Celebration Museum (Estonian: Laulupeomuuseum) is a museum in Tartu, Estonia, dedicated to the Estonian Song Celebration tradition. The museum is a part of the Tartu City History Museums. It was founded on 19 October 2007.

== Museum building ==
=== Architecture ===
The museum is located in Tartu on Jaama Street in the Ülejõe neighbourhood, in the former residence of the Vanemuine Society. The Jaama Street 14 building was built in the first half of the 19th century. The classic façade from the original building is one of the reasons why the building is listed as a cultural monument. The purchase and sale agreement of 1847 stated that the building had several wooden additions to it. As a result of these additional parts connected to the building, the architecture of the house has completely changed over time.

=== Societies ===
On 24 June 1865, the Vanemuine Society was brought to life on the initiative of Johann Voldemar Jannsen. It became one of the most important societies in Estonia. Society started to promote male singing and brass music, but soon it began to expand its reach. In addition to music, both members and guests attended educational speech nights and monthly social gatherings. Vanemuine Society moved to the building on 17 April 1870. Three years later, the Vanemuine Society bought the Jaama Street 14 building.

Johann Voldemar Jannsen

In addition to the Vanemuine Society, the General Committee of the Estonian Alexander School (1870–1883), the Estonian Farmers’ Society (1870–1901), the Society of Estonian Literati (1872–1882) and the Estonian Students’ Society (1874–1902) have also been active in the house of Jaama 14.

On 19 July 1903, a fire broke out in the Jaama Street 14 building and its wooden parts were destroyed. With the support of the citizens, the society started to build a new house on the Aia Street (the current Vanemuine Street).

After the fire of the Jaama 14 house in 1903, the Vanemuine Society sold its plot with the ruins of the house to the Tartu Kindergarten Society (Estonian: Tartu Lasteaia Selts), which was established in 1905. As a result of the work of this society, the first Estonian national kindergarten was opened to teach the Estonian language, letters, numbers and drawing using games and songs, as well as to develop the physical abilities of children. The kindergarten started operating in its Jaama Street building in 1910 and remained there until 1988.

On 19 October 2007, Tartu City Museum's Song Festival Museum was opened in the renovated building.

=== The birth of the Estonian Song Celebration ===
Following the example of the Baltic Germans, Jannsen had the idea of organising his song festival for Estonians already before the society moved to their Jaama Street building. In 1867, the Vanemuine Society applied the governor-general of the Baltic States to organise a song festival in Tartu from 18 to 20 June 1869. The permit only arrived on February 20 of the year of the festival. However, the festival could still take place, as many preparations had already been done before the authorisation.

The first song festival was dedicated to the 50th anniversary of the liberation of Livonian peasants from slavery. 46 male choirs with 822 singers and five brass orchestras with 56 instruments participated in the festival. The directors of the festival were Johann Voldemar Jannsen and Valga seminary teacher Aleksander Kunileid.

The song festival concerts took place in the garden of the Resource Society in Tartu. It was located in the area opposite the main entrance of the current St. Peter's Church (there is now a memorial stone for the first song festival). The opening day of the song festival started with religious music, the second day was dedicated to secular music and a choir singing competition was held on the third day.

The successful song festival inspired the Vanemuine Society and they decided to organise such an event every five years. Unfortunately, this decision has not always been followed for a variety of reasons, particularly political and military reasons.[1]

In 2003, Estonian song and dance festivals were placed on the UNESCO List of the Intangible Cultural Heritage of Humanity. Therefore the tradition, which began in Tartu in the Vanemuine Society in 1869, had merited global recognition.

Estonia, together with Latvia and Lithuania, submitted a joint application to UNESCO to recognise the importance of the Estonian Song and Dance Festival, the Latvian Song and Dance Festival and the Lithuanian Song Festival.[2]

=== The birth of Estonian Theatre ===
In addition to initiating the tradition of song festivals, the Vanemuine Society also has a compelling role to play in the revival of Estonian national theatre: the first professional theatre in Estonia grew out of the society's theatrical activities.

The fifth anniversary of the society was just a few months after moving into the Jaama Street building in Tartu. Jannsen's daughter Lydia (with a pen name Koidula) wrote an Estonian play "Cousin from Saaremaa", especially for this festive event. It was an adjustment of Theodor Körner’s German play "Der Vetter aus Bremen" ("The cousin from Bremen").

Performing "Cousin from Saaremaa" on the birthday of the Vanemuine Society on the 24th of June in 1870 is considered to be the birthday of the Estonian National Theatre.[1]

=== Permanent exhibitions ===
==== Carrying Our Own Tune ====
A permanent exhibition dedicated to song festivals was opened in the exhibition hall on the first floor of the museum in 2019. The exhibition showcases the tradition of song festivals and the role of Tartu in its development.

On display, the visitor learns how the song festival was born, how it has preserved and nurtured our traditions, and what has been the politics related to the song festivals. The permanent exhibition is structured by themes to introduce general developments in the history of song festivals.

The title of the exhibition plays with the ambiguity of the word tune in Estonian (Estonian word viis ("tune") means melody, but also the manner of doing something). After all, the song festival is a musical experience, but also a natural part of Estonian culture, a way of being that we do not wish to give up. On the other hand, the title emphasizes the permanence of the tradition and its conscious keeping.

The permanent exhibition highlights the active role of all the creators of the song festival – the organizing team, singers and the audience – in shaping the song festival into this notable national and musical event.

Compiled by Kristiina Tael, Karoliina Kalda and Paula Põder

Designer Kärt Einasto

==== Curtain up! Theatre Vanemuine 150 ====
The permanent theatrical exhibition is dedicated to the 150th anniversary of the Vanemuine Theatre. It was opened in the exhibition hall on the third floor of the museum in 2020. The exhibition introduces the theatre both as a traditional cultural medium and as a carrier of innovative directions. It also draws attention to the contribution of the Vanemuine theatre and its creative workers to Estonian cultural history.

The exhibition gives a comprehensive overview of the history of the Vanemuine Theatre and introduces its role in shaping Estonian society. In addition, visitors can learn more about how the theatre functions as an institution.

At the heart of the exhibition hall is a reduced copy of the authentic theatre stage, which is used for educational programmes, role-playing and theatre performances. The exhibition stage offers an opportunity to get a unique look at the backstage world of the theatre. It also introduces creative activities happening the backstage: visitors become acquainted with the terms of the performances and the theatre world through participatory activities.

Designer Silver Vahtre[1]
