= Latvian School Youth Song and Dance Festival =

Quinquennial youth cultural festival in Latvia

Latvian School Youth Song and Dance Festival Latvijas Skolu jaunatnes dziesmu un deju svētki
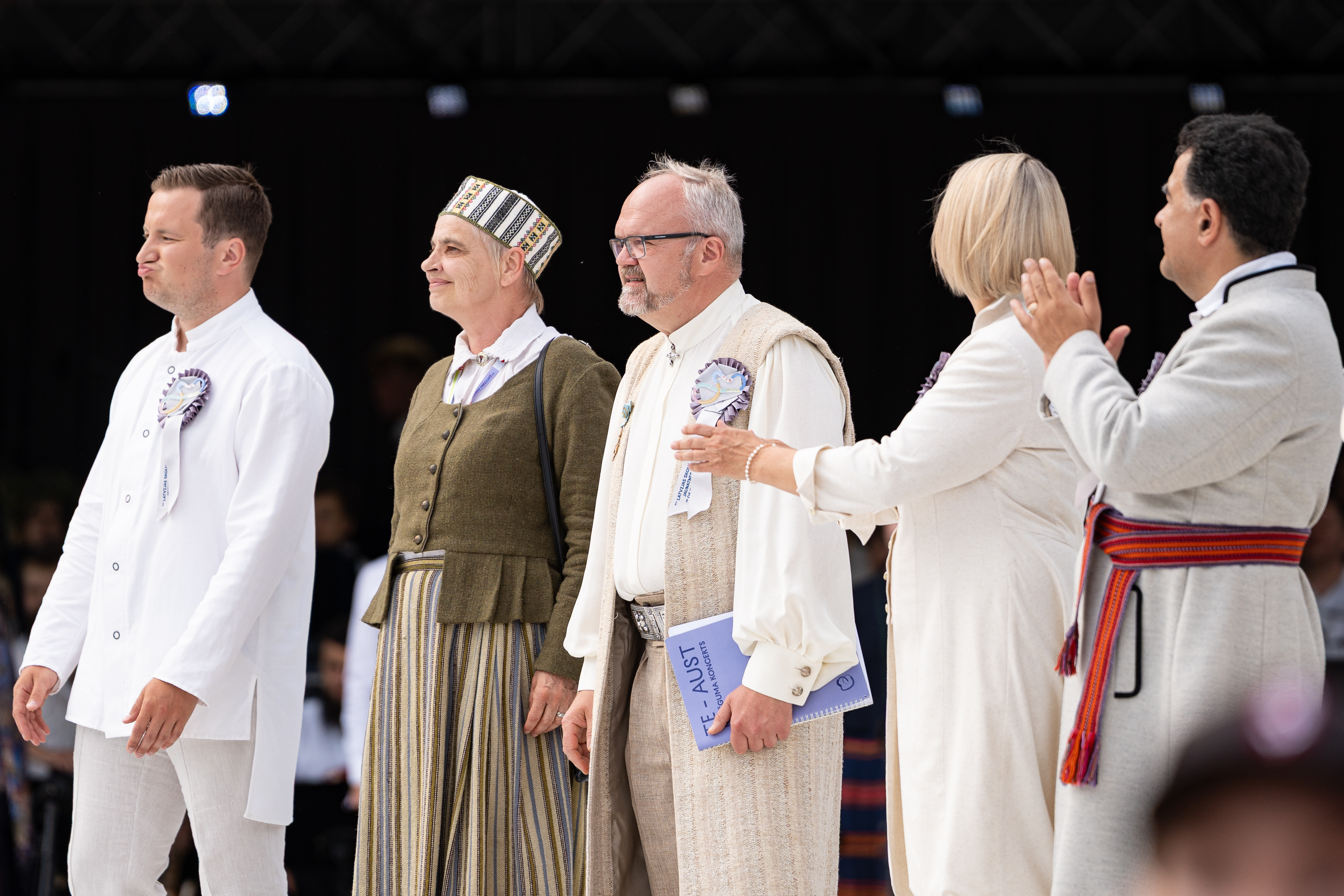
- Closing concert at the Mežaparks Great Bandstand in 2025
- Status: Active
- Genre: Choral music, folk and contemporary dance, instrumental music, folklore, theatre and visual arts
- Frequency: Every five years
- Location: Riga
- Country: Latvia
- Years active: 1960–present
- Inaugurated: 23 June 1960
- Most recent: 5–13 July 2025
- Next event: 2030
- Website: www.nacgavilet.lv/en/

The Latvian School Youth Song and Dance Festival (Latvian: Latvijas Skolu jaunatnes dziesmu un deju svētki), also translated in Latvian legislation as the Latvian School Youth Song and Dance Celebration, is a national performing-arts festival for children and young people in Latvia. It brings together school choirs, folk and contemporary dance groups, brass bands, symphony orchestras, folklore groups, kokle ensembles, theatre groups and young visual artists. The principal joint events are held in Riga, traditionally including choral concerts at the Mežaparks Great Bandstand and dance performances at Daugava Stadium.

The festival was first held in Riga on 23 June 1960, after children's performances had become an established part of Latvia's nationwide song festivals in 1948, 1950 and 1955. Latvian law treats it and the Nationwide Latvian Song and Dance Celebration as the two components of the country's Song and Dance Celebration tradition. The youth festival is normally held every five years, between editions of the nationwide festival. The wider Baltic song and dance celebration tradition of Latvia, Estonia and Lithuania is included in UNESCO's Representative List of the Intangible Cultural Heritage of Humanity; the youth festival functions as one of the means through which the Latvian part of that tradition is transmitted to younger generations.

The thirteenth festival, held from 5 to 13 July 2025, involved more than 38,000 participants from Latvia and the Latvian diaspora. Post-event reporting estimated an aggregate audience of about 300,000 across the programme and recorded more than 100,000 tickets sold.

== History ==
=== Origins and Soviet period ===
The immediate predecessors of the festival were schoolchildren's performances within the nationwide Latvian song festivals of 1948, 1950 and 1955. As the number and performance level of school choirs and dance groups increased, a separate youth event was established in 1960. Researcher Rita Spalva has described the 1960 establishment as the point at which the school youth festival became an independent movement within Latvia's song-and-dance tradition.

The first edition was held in Riga on 23 June 1960. Subsequent Soviet-era editions took place in 1967, 1972, 1979, 1984 and 1989. By the tenth festival in 2010, contemporary accounts described the event as marking the tradition's fiftieth anniversary and bringing together about 30,000 children and young people.

=== After the restoration of independence ===
The seventh festival, held on 2 July 1995, was the first edition after the restoration of Latvia's independence. It involved around 30,000 participants and opened with the Latvian national anthem. Further editions followed in 2000, 2005 and 2010.

The 2010 festival ran from 2 to 11 July. Its preparation involved repertoire acquisition, regional reviews and competitions over the preceding years, reflecting the continuous cycle of work between the main festival weeks. The eleventh festival in 2015 presented more than 50 events at 15 venues, including choral, dance, orchestral, theatre and workshop programmes. It was also the first edition to include organised participation by Latvian diaspora groups.

During a dress rehearsal for the 2015 closing concert, a number of young participants fainted. A government commission later identified a combination of factors, including fatigue, insufficient food and water, heat and crowding; 17 children were taken to hospital and nine remained overnight. Its recommendations led participant welfare and the organisation of rehearsals to receive increased public attention.

=== Pandemic edition ===
The twelfth festival was scheduled for 2020 but was postponed because of the COVID-19 pandemic. Proposals for a predominantly digital festival in 2021 prompted debate about whether a decentralised format could preserve the collective character of the tradition.

The 2021 programme ultimately took place from July to October in municipalities around Latvia, without a central gathering or large joint rehearsals. It comprised 15 event strands in singing, instrumental music, dance, folklore and visual arts. The travelling procession Saulesvija visited all 43 municipalities then existing in Latvia's administrative structure and greeted local participants rather than bringing them to Riga.

=== Return to a central festival ===
The festival returned to its traditional central format in Riga in 2025, ten years after the previous full-scale edition. Preparatory registration in November 2024 indicated more than 40,000 prospective participants, with the largest groups consisting of folk dancers and choir singers. Following auditions and selection, about 37,550 participants were registered, including 33,630 children and young people, as well as group leaders and accompanying adults.

The thirteenth festival took place from 5 to 13 July 2025 and comprised more than 30 events at over 15 venues. Organisers described it as the largest youth festival by participant numbers since the restoration of independence, with more than 38,000 people taking part.

== Format and preparation ==
The festival is the culmination of a five-year preparation cycle rather than a single week of performances. Latvian law provides for continuing activity by amateur collectives, repertoire learning, regional events, competitions and exhibitions, and professional development for conductors and group leaders between editions. Entry to the principal joint performances is determined through sector-specific competitions and review competitions.

The programme has expanded beyond massed choir and folk-dance concerts. Recent editions have included brass and symphony orchestras, kokle and accordion ensembles, folklore, contemporary and street dance, theatre, vocal and instrumental ensembles, and visual and applied arts. In 2025, registered participants included 301 choirs, 809 folk-dance groups, 44 brass bands, 34 symphony orchestras, 56 kokle ensembles, 43 accordion ensembles, 80 folklore groups, 108 contemporary and street-dance groups and 258 visual and applied-arts groups.

The main shared venues are in Riga. The closing choral concert is traditionally staged at the Mežaparks Great Bandstand, while the large folk-dance production is held at Daugava Stadium; smaller concerts, competitions and exhibitions use theatres, concert halls, parks, educational institutions and museums around the city.

== Governance, funding and participant welfare ==
The Song and Dance Celebration Law assigns the Ministry of Education and Science responsibility for the preparation of the school youth festival, including its artistic council, chief conductors and group leaders, and the submission of a draft budget. The state provides the principal joint-rehearsal and concert venues, while municipalities support preparation and accommodation of local groups.

The scale of the festival makes public financing and welfare arrangements recurring policy issues. The initial state allocation for the 2025 edition was €9.89 million; an additional €1.3 million was later assigned after participant numbers exceeded forecasts. The estimated total organisational cost rose to €14.26 million, including additional spending on safety and participant wellbeing.

A post-festival evaluation in November 2025 reported strong willingness among young participants to return for the next edition, planned for 2030, but also identified workload, fatigue and low remuneration among group leaders as issues for the next preparation cycle. The evaluation put state spending at about €10 million and combined municipal expenditure at about €6 million.

== Editions ==
Latvian School Youth Song and Dance Festivals
No.	Year	Notes
I	1960	First separate school youth festival, held on 23 June in Riga.
II	1967	
III	1972	
IV	1979	
V	1984	
VI	1989	Final edition during the Soviet period.
VII	1995	First edition after the restoration of Latvian independence; about 30,000 participants.
VIII	2000	
IX	2005	
X	2010	Marked fifty years since the first festival.
XI	2015	More than 50 events at 15 venues; first organised participation by diaspora groups.
XII	2021	Decentralised pandemic-era edition, held in municipalities without a central gathering.
XIII	2025	Return to a central Riga format; more than 38,000 participants.

The official festival history lists the first twelve editions through 2021, while the 2025 event was designated the thirteenth.

== Cultural role ==
The festival is intended to maintain youth participation in the wider Latvian song-and-dance tradition. Spalva argues that its dance component supports intergenerational transmission by linking school-age performers with folk-dance repertoire and the organisational practices of the nationwide celebration. The statutory framework similarly treats preparation between festival years as a continuous cultural process rather than an occasional event.

The youth festival is related to, but institutionally and chronologically distinct from, the Nationwide Latvian Song and Dance Celebration. The two events alternate within five-year cycles and are organised through different responsible institutions under the same legal safeguarding framework.

== See also ==
- Latvian Song and Dance Festival
- Baltic song festivals
- Estonian Song Festival
- Lithuanian Song Festival
