= Songfest =

Songfest may refer to:

- Songfest: A Cycle of American Poems for Six Singers and Orchestra, a 1977 work by Leonard Bernstein
- Steel Bridge Songfest, in Sturgeon Bay, Wisconsin
- Song festival (disambiguation)

== See also ==
- Singfest
- SongVest
