= Intervision =

Intervision may refer to:

== Intervision network and Song Contest ==
- Intervision network (1960–1993), the Eastern European equivalent of the Eurovision network
- Intervision Song Contest, an international song competition contest
  - Five Stars: Intervision (2008), a revival of the Intervision Song Contest in 2008
  - Intervision 2025, the 2025 edition of the Intervision Song Contest
- "Intervision" (Shostakovich), a 1971 orchestral composition by Dmitri Shostakovich

== Other uses ==
- Intervision (album), a 1997 album by Jimi Tenor
- Inter-Vision, a TV production company, the production company behind TVJQ, that became Vrak

== See also ==
- Eurovision (disambiguation)
