= Asiavision =

Asiavision may refer to:

- Asiavision (news exchange), video news exchange operated by the Asia-Pacific Broadcasting Union (ABU)
- ABU Song Festival (disambiguation), various song festivals and contests organized by the Asia-Pacific Broadcasting Union
- Eurovision Song Contest Asia, an Asian-Pacific version of the Eurovision Song Contest, organised by the European Broadcasting Union.
- Urban Vision (also known as Asia Vision), American entertainment company
- Asia Vision (TV network), television broadcaster in the US
- Asiavision Awards, Indian film and television awards

== See also ==
- Eurovision (disambiguation)
