= ABU Song Festival =

ABU Song Festival may refer to:

- ABU Song Festivals, song festivals and contests organised by the Asia-Pacific Broadcasting Union (ABU) since 2012
  - ABU Radio Song Festival, a biennial radio song festival
  - ABU TV Song Festival, an annual television song festival
  - ABU Song Contest, planned but unrealized song contest
    - ABU Song Contest 2020, cancelled first edition of the contest

== See also ==
- Asiavision (disambiguation)
- Song Festival (disambiguation)
- Song Contest (disambiguation)
