= Latvian Radio Choir =

Musical group in Latvia

The Latvian Radio Choir (Latvijas Radio koris) is the professional chamber choir of Latvian Radio which was founded in 1940 by the Latvian conductor Teodors Kalnins. Following the musical direction by Edgars Račevskis (1963–1986) and Juris Kļaviņš (1987–1992). The choir has had two conductors ever since 1992 - musical director and principal conductor. The choir is currently of 24 singers under the leadership of Sigvards Kļava and Kaspars Putniņš.

== Selected discography ==
- Paradisus vocis, 2018. Composer Andrejs Selickis conducted by Sigvards Kļava.
- Sacred Love, 2014. Composers Yuri Falik, Arturs Maskats, Georgy Sviridov conducted by Sigvards Kļava.
- Mythes étoilés, 2014. Composers Lasse Thorersen, György Ligeti, Mārtiņš Viļums, John Cage, Anders Hillborg, Toivo Tulev conducted by Sigvards Kļava, Kaspars Putniņš.
- Adam's Lament (ECM), 2012. Composed by Arvo Pärt conducted by Tõnu Kaljuste. Winner of Grammy Award 2013 Best Choral Performance, Classical.
- Bruckner: Latin Motets, conducted by Sigvards Kļava, 2020 − Ondine, ODE1362-2
