= Edgars Račevskis =

Latvian conductor (1936–2022)

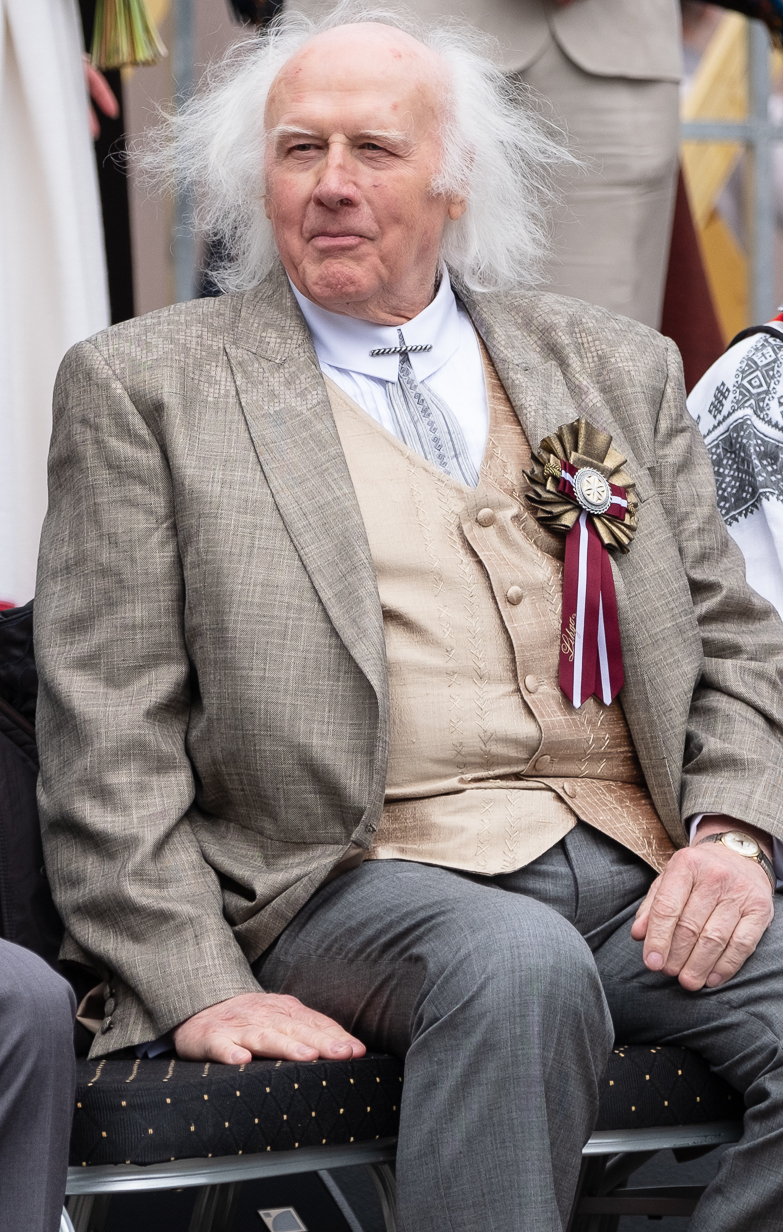
Edgars Račevskis, 2018

Edgars Račevskis (11 July 1936 – 15 February 2022) was a Latvian conductor.

== Biography ==
Račevskis was born in the Skrunda Parish. He studied at the primary school in Turlava and then at the Liepāja Music High School. He graduated from the Riga's Jāzeps Mediņš Music High School in 1955 and graduated from the Jāzeps Vītols Latvian Academy of Music in 1960.

From 1959 to 1996 he conducted the men's choir Gaudeamus, and from 1960 to 1963 at the Latvian Philharmonic. After that, until the mid-1980s, he was the chief conductor and artistic director of the Latvian Radio Choir. He has also been the conductor of several choirs, including the State Academic Choir "Latvija". He was a choirmaster of the Latvian National Opera from 1994 to 1997. He composed compositions for the choir.

From 1970, he was the chief conductor of the Latvian Song and Dance Festival.

He was an honorary member of the Latvian Composers’ Union since 2004. Račevskis died on 15 February 2022, at the age of 85.

== Awards ==
- Grand Music Award (1993).
- Order of the Three Stars of the 4th class (1996)
