= Estonian Dance Festival =

Dance festival in Estonia

Estonian Dance Festival Üldtantsupidu
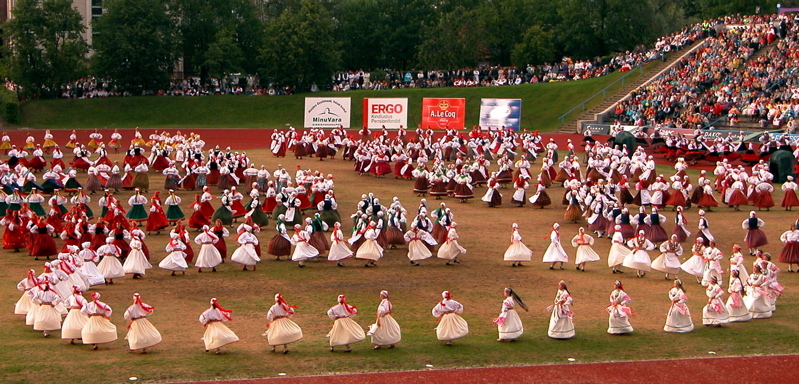
- Circular dance
- Genre: Dance festival
- Date: July
- Frequency: Five-year
- Venue: Kalevi Keskstaadion
- Locations: Tallinn, Estonia
- Inaugurated: 1934

Baltic song and dance celebrations
- UNESCO Intangible Cultural Heritage
- Country: Estonia, Latvia, and Lithuania
- Reference: 00087
- Region: Europe and North America

Inscription history
- Inscription: 2008 (3rd session)
- List: Representative

The Estonian Dance Festival is a national dance and gymnastics celebration currently held every five years at the Kalevi Keskstaadion in Tallinn, Estonia. The festival is maintained and developed by the Estonian Song and Dance Celebration Foundation. The Dance Festival is usually held on the same weekend as the Estonian Song Festival.

== History ==
The first Estonian Games, Dance and Gymnastics festival was held in 1934 and was the precursor of the present dance celebration.

In November 2003, UNESCO declared Estonia's Song and Dance Celebration tradition a masterpiece of the Oral and Intangible Heritage of Humanity.

Estonian Dance Festival
| Celebration | Time | Performances | Participants |
|---|---|---|---|
| I Celebration | June 15–17, 1934 | 2 | 1500 |
| II Celebration | June 16–18, 1939 | 1 | 1800 |
| III Celebration | June 27, 1947 | 1 | 840 |
| IV Celebration | July 21, 1950 | 1 | 1500 |
| V Celebration | June 20–21, 1955 | 2 | 3040 |
| VI Celebration | June 19–20, 1960 | 2 | 3830 |
| VII Celebration | July 20–21, 1963 | 3 | 3824 |
| VIII Celebration | July 18–20, 1965 | 3 | 5049 |
| IX Celebration | July 18–19, 1970 | 3 | 9997 |
| X Celebration | June 30 - July 1, 1973 | 3 | 5893 |
| XI Celebration | July 18–20, 1975 | 5 | 6033 |
| XII Celebration | July 3–5, 1981 | 5 | 7006 |
| XIII Celebration | July 19–21, 1985 | 4 | 8273 |
| XIV Celebration | June 28 - July 1, 1990 | 4 | 8874 |
| XV Celebration | July 1–3, 1994 | 3 | 7599 |
| XVI Celebration | July 2–4, 1999 | 3 | 7973 |
| XVII Celebration | July 2–4, 2004 | 2 | 7781 |
| XVIII Celebration | July 3–5, 2009 | 3 | 7460 |
| XIX Celebration | July 4–6, 2014 | 3 | 10 082 |
| XX Celebration | July 4–5, 2019 | 3 | 11 500 |

== Gallery ==
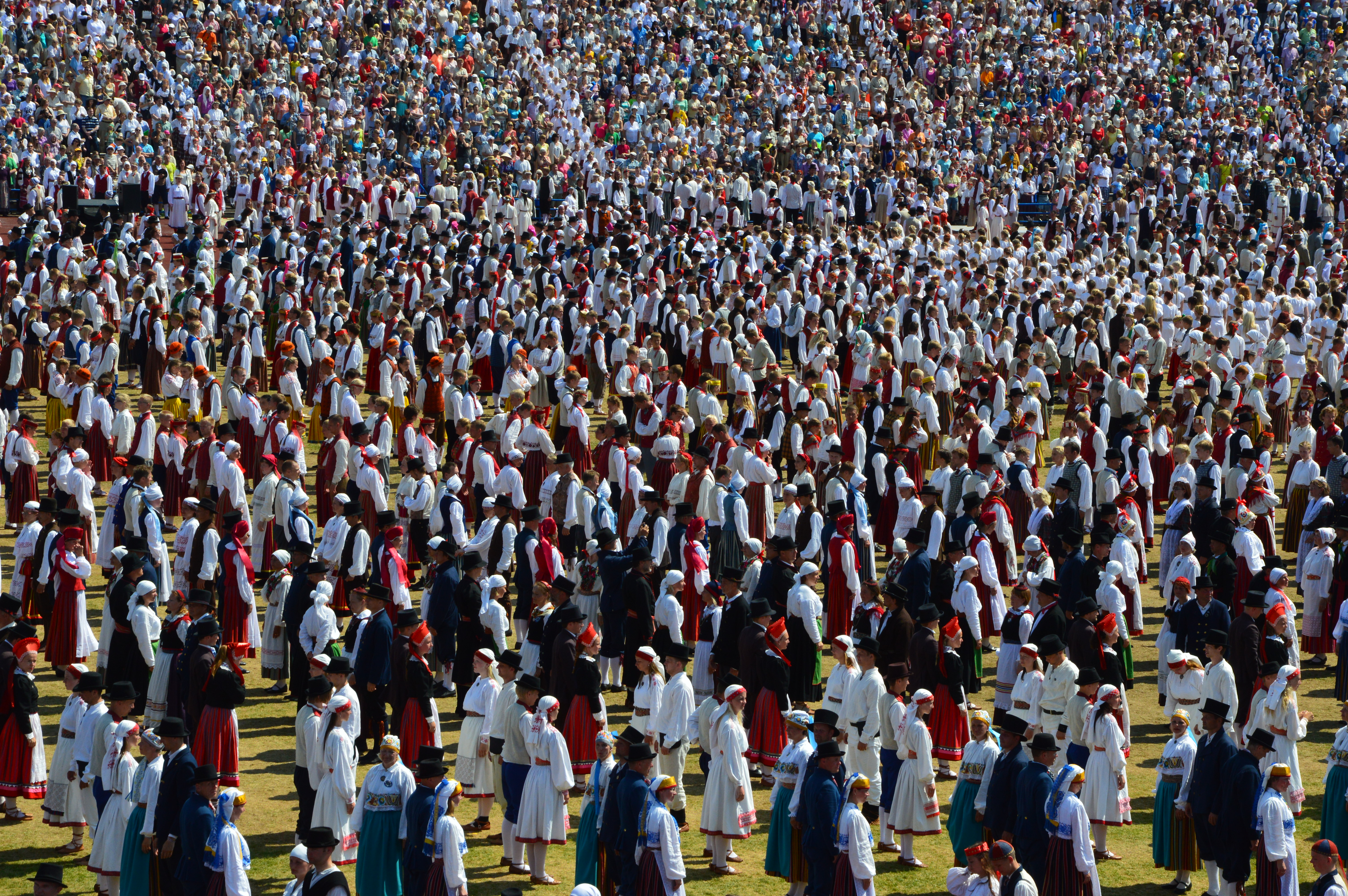
XIX Celebration

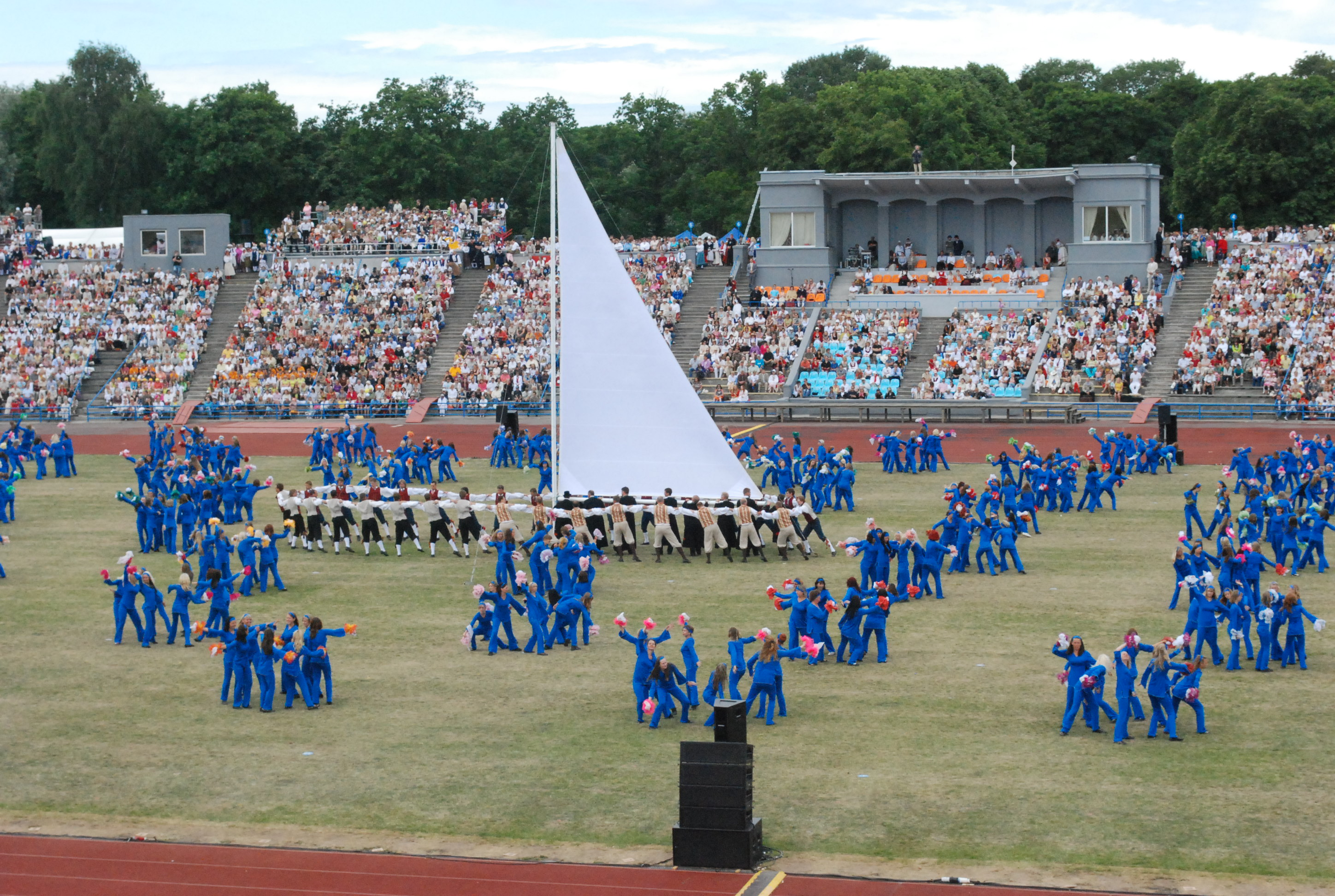
XVIII Celebration

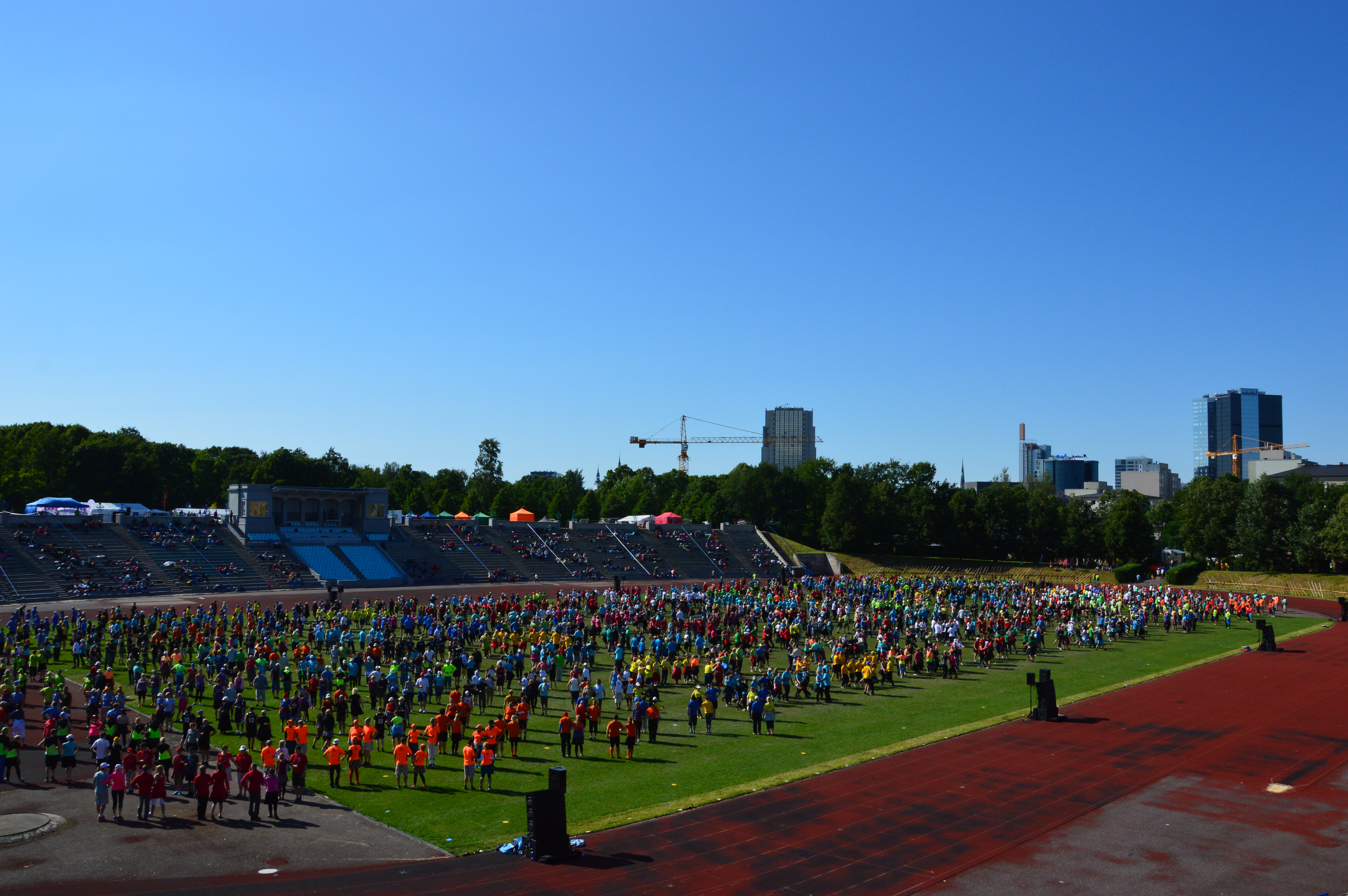
XIX Celebration rehearsal

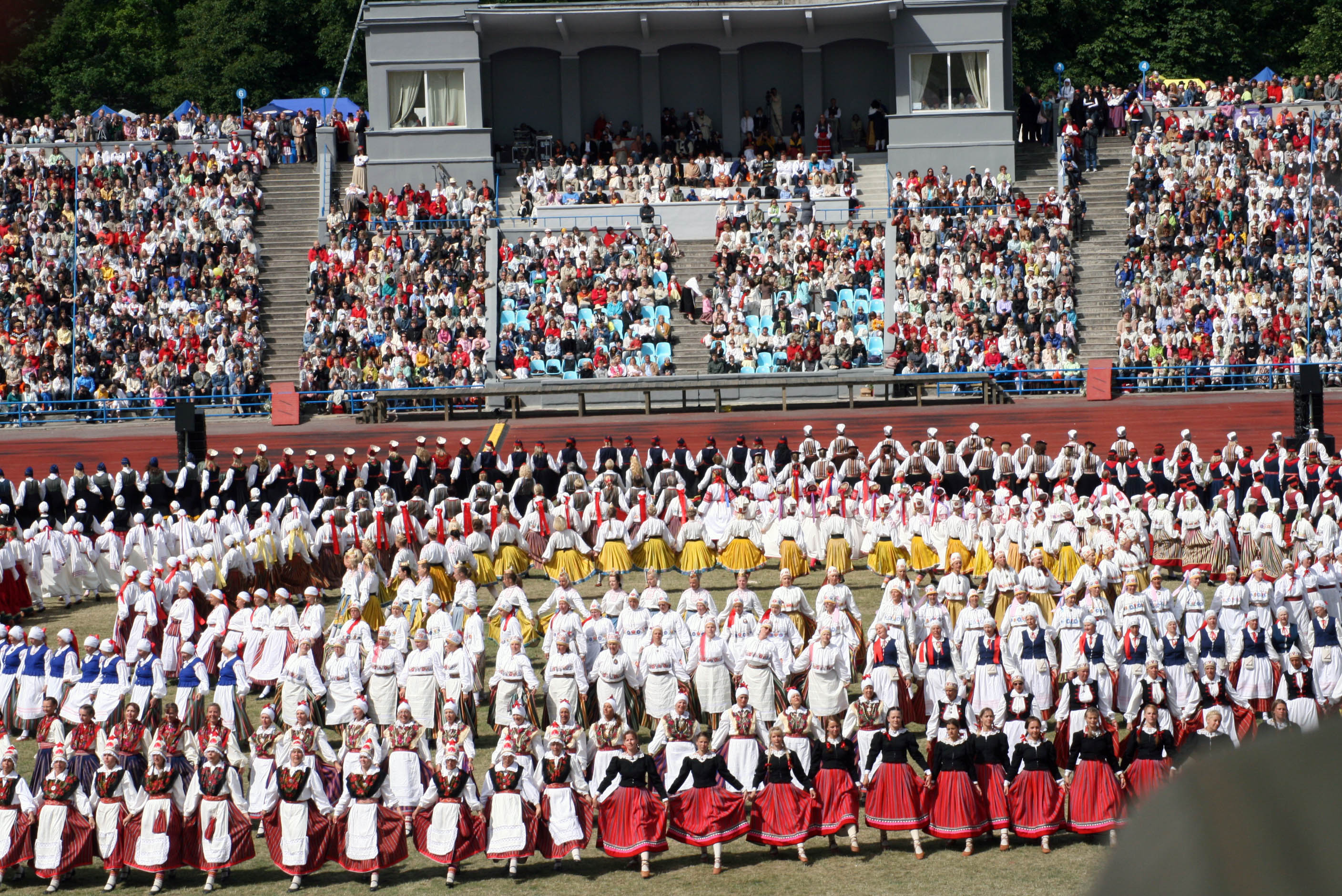
Dance Festival

== See also ==
- Estonian folk dance
- Estonian Song Festival
- Estonian culture
