= Eurovision (disambiguation) =

Eurovision usually refers to the Eurovision Song Contest, an annual song competition.

Eurovision may also refer to:

- Eurovision (network), a TV network part of the European Broadcasting Union, that organises the Eurovision Song Contest and other Eurovision events
- "Euro-Vision", the 1980 Belgian entry to the Eurovision Song Contest by Telex
- Eurovision Song Contest: The Story of Fire Saga, a 2020 comedy film inspired by the Eurovision Song Contest
- The Eurovision Museum, a museum exhibition in Húsavík, Iceland about the history of the Eurovision Song Contest

== See also ==
- Eurosong (disambiguation)
- Asiavision (disambiguation)
