= SongVest =

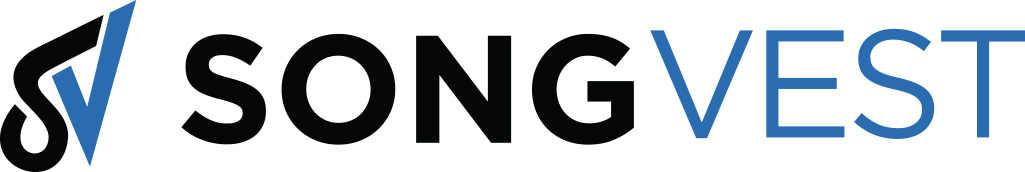
- Founded: 2007
- Website: www.songvest.com

SongVest is an American company that operates an online platform for buying and selling music royalties and other royalty assets. It provides a centralized online marketplace where royalty owners can sell their future payments to investors. It initially closed down in 2013 but was relaunched in 2020.

== History ==
Sean Peace and David Prohaska launched SongVest in October 2008 with an initial aim of auctioning small portions of the royalties of 18 songs, recorded by artists including Cher, Garth Brooks, and Aerosmith, to fans as memorabilia. The business plan was to collect commissions from buyer and seller at the time of sale, after which SongVest would handle the royalty payments to the buyers. The songs included "(Theme from) The Monkees" and Brooks' "Friends in Low Places." The official launch followed a test auction in 2007 that had taken in $25,000 for one-quarter interests in two songs by the band Stryper.

In 2011, Peace expanded on the idea, co-founding Royalty Exchange with Reggie Calloway and Wilson Owens to offer royalty shares in music and other properties to accredited investors on a larger scale.

The initial iteration of SongVest closed down in December 2013, but Peace continued with Royalty Exchange until October 2015. SongVest was later relaunched in 2020. SongVest conducts due diligence and financial analysis of the music royalty opportunities it plans to offer, then lists the opportunities on its website. Registered users can bid on the opportunities when they go live. SongVest then provides closing paperwork and notifies the organizations that pay the royalties of the auction results.

SongVest's notable auctions have extended beyond music, to include memorabilia, and comedy albums.

In 2021, SongVest added an advance auction platform that created a new financing opportunity for artists and songwriters, enabling these rights holders to lock in a low internal rate of return, retain ownership of their copyright, and retain a buyback option.

SongVest auctions current as of summer 2021 included the writer's share of hits by Flo Rida and catalogs that include songs recorded by Cardi B, Notorious B.I.G, Travis Scott, Busta Rhymes, Mariah Carey, Onyx, and Sister Hazel.

== Notable Auctions ==
- Michael Jackson: In December 2010 SongVest auctioned memorabilia from Michael Jackson and John Lennon.
- Rudy Ray Moore: On 30 July 2020 SongVest auctioned the master recordings of the comedy albums of Rudy Ray Moore, best known for his Dolemite persona.
- Pac-Man Fever: In April 2021 SongVest brokered its first NFT auction, consisting of five NFT versions of Jerry Buckner's "NiFTy Fever", an updated take on the 1980s Buckner & Garcia hit "Pac-Man Fever."
