= Baltic song and dance celebrations =

Transnational song and dance celebration tradition in the Baltic states

- UNESCO Intangible Cultural Heritage
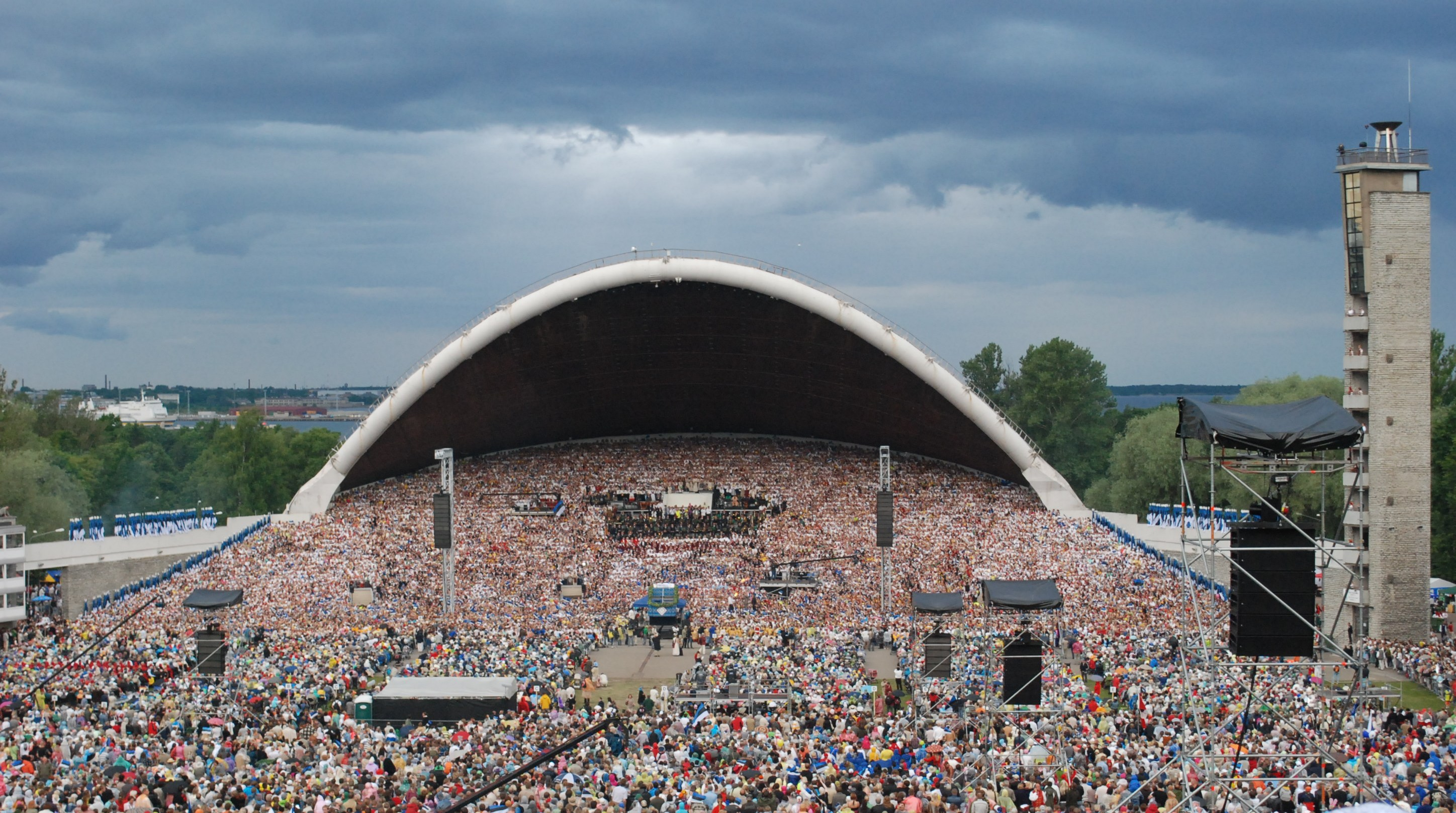
- 25th Estonian Song Festival in Tallinn, 2009
- Country: Estonia, Latvia, and Lithuania
- Reference: 00087
- Region: Europe and North America

Inscription history
- Inscription: 2008 (3rd session)
- List: Representative

The Baltic song and dance celebrations, also known as the Baltic song festivals (Estonian: laulupidu, Latvian: dziesmu svētki, Lithuanian: dainų šventė), form a transnational tradition of mass amateur choral, dance, instrumental and folk-art celebrations in Estonia, Latvia and Lithuania. They are not one synchronised Baltic-wide festival: each country maintains a separate national series with its own numbering, programme and calendar. The principal national celebrations are normally held every five years in Estonia and Latvia and every four years in Lithuania.

The celebrations last several days and bring together as many as 40,000 singers and dancers, most of them members of amateur choirs and dance groups. Their programmes range from traditional folk songs to contemporary compositions and also include orchestral music, folk ensembles, processions and exhibitions. Preparation continues throughout the cycle in community centres and local cultural institutions under professional artistic leadership.

The joint Estonian, Latvian and Lithuanian nomination was proclaimed a Masterpiece of the Oral and Intangible Heritage of Humanity in 2003 and was incorporated into the Representative List of the Intangible Cultural Heritage of Humanity in 2008. The UNESCO element has the identifier 00087.

== Practice and preparation ==
The national celebrations are the culmination of continuous activity by local choirs, dance ensembles, orchestras and folklore groups rather than isolated festival weeks. Participants rehearse festival repertoires between editions, while the main programmes combine massed choral singing, folk dance, instrumental performance and other forms of folk art.

== History ==
Choirs and musical societies became institutionalised in Estonia during the 18th century. In the 19th century, choral singing spread through rural and urban communities as singing societies and song festivals gained popularity in Western Europe. The first national celebrations were held in Estonia in 1869 and Latvia in 1873; Lithuania held its first celebration in 1924.

A comparative study by Guntis Šmidchens inventoried 1,964 works performed at 70 Estonian, Latvian and Lithuanian national song celebrations between 1869 and 2014. It identified twelve songs that had been remembered and repeated across different periods in the histories of the national series.

== National celebrations ==
National song and dance celebration series
Country	National series	First celebration	Usual interval	Most recent nationwide edition
Estonia	Estonian Song Festival and Estonian Dance Festival	1869, Tartu	five years	28th Song and 21st Dance Celebration, 2025
Latvia	Latvian Song and Dance Festival	1873, Riga	five years	27th Song and 17th Dance Celebration, 2023
Lithuania	Lithuanian Song and Dance Festival	1924, Kaunas	four years	centenary celebration, 2024

=== Estonia ===
The first Estonian Song Festival took place in Tartu in 1869 at the initiative of publisher Johann Voldemar Jannsen. It involved 878 male singers and brass players and formed part of the Estonian national awakening movement.

The 28th Song and 21st Dance Celebration, Iseoma, took place in Tallinn from 3 to 6 July 2025. The combined programme involved more than 40,000 singers, dancers, orchestral musicians and folk musicians. The closing song concert brought together 32,022 singers and 58,000 spectators, while the opening concert involved performers from 990 choirs and bands.

=== Latvia ===
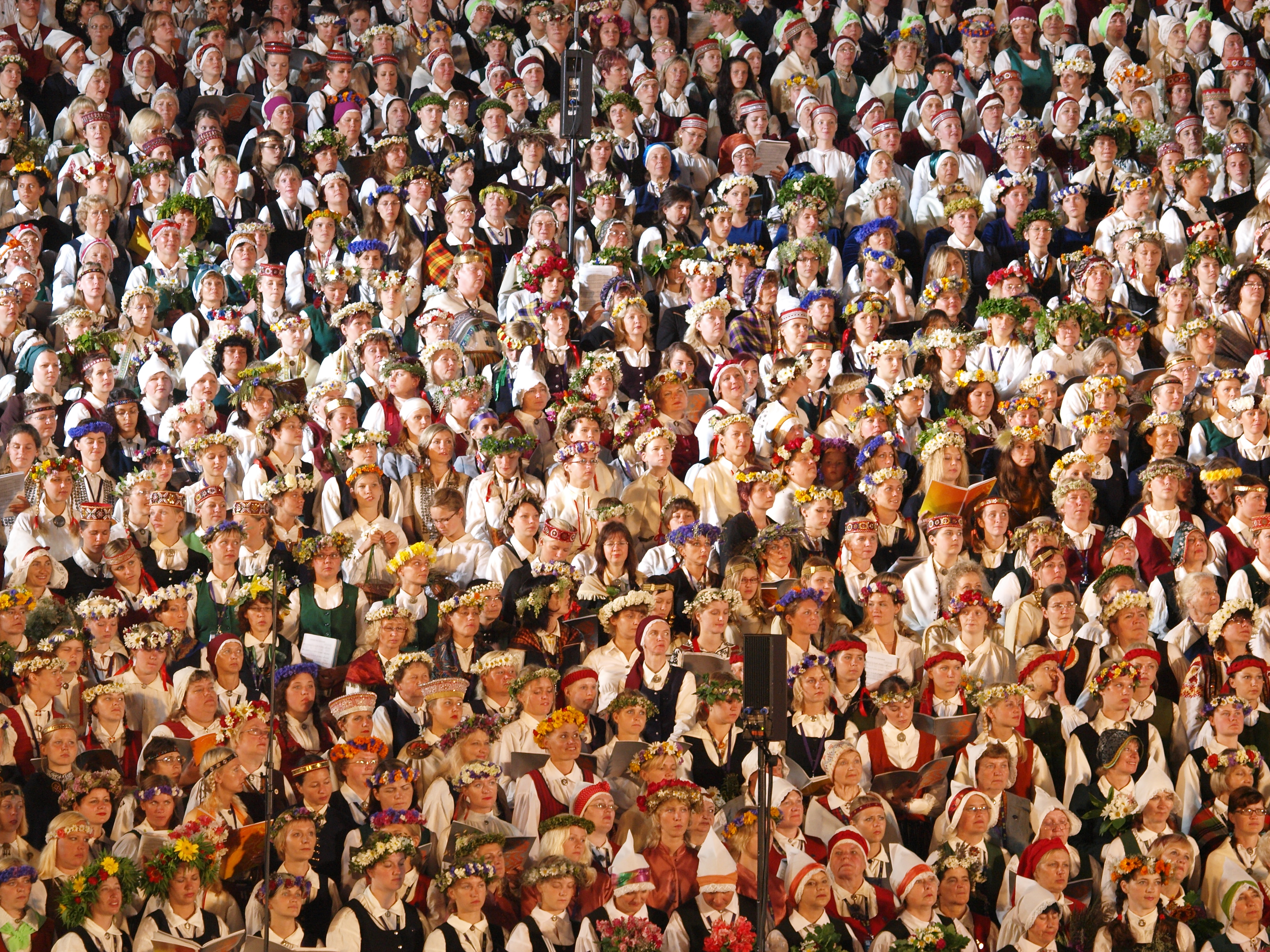
Song and dance festival in Riga, 2008

The first Nationwide Latvian Song Festival was held in Riga in 1873. The national series continued under the Russian Empire, during Latvia's periods of independence and during the Soviet period. The 27th Song and 17th Dance Celebration took place from 30 June to 9 July 2023 and involved 40,560 participants, including Latvian diaspora groups. Organisers estimated that aggregate attendance across its free and ticketed events exceeded half a million.

Latvian law defines two separate components of the national tradition: the Nationwide Latvian Song and Dance Celebration and the Latvian School Youth Song and Dance Festival. Both have five-year cycles, with the school-youth celebration held between editions of the nationwide celebration and administered through the education system.

=== Lithuania ===
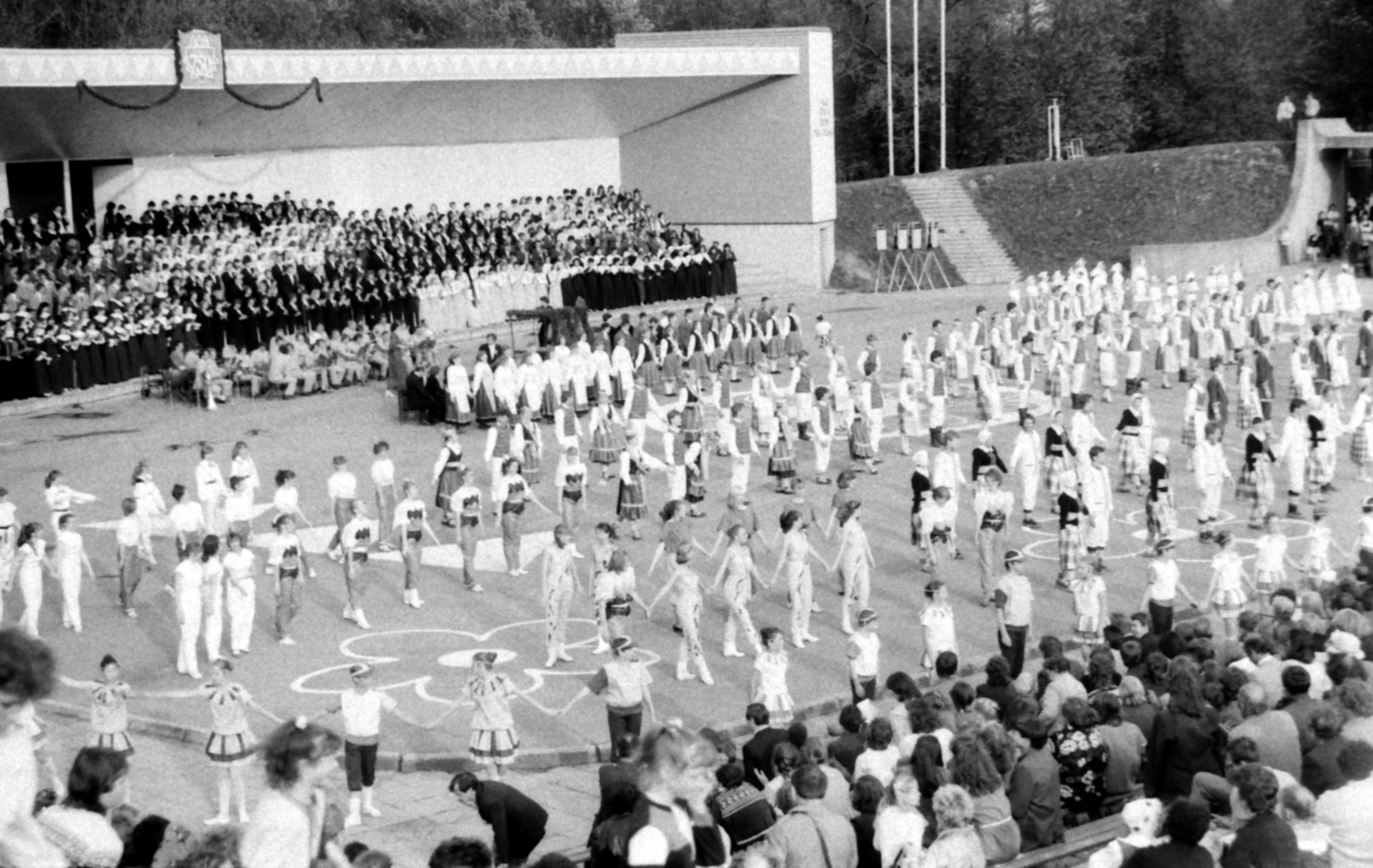
Song festival in Šiauliai, 1986

The first Lithuanian Song Celebration was held in Kaunas in August 1924. It involved about 3,000 performers; organisers provided 10,000 seats, but contemporary attendance was estimated at about 60,000 spectators.

The centenary Lithuanian Song Celebration took place in Kaunas and Vilnius from 29 June to 6 July 2024. Its 14 programmes involved 37,000 participants. UNESCO described the 2024 celebration as a constituent part of the wider Baltic song and dance celebration tradition.

== UNESCO recognition and safeguarding ==
The joint nomination by Estonia, Latvia and Lithuania was proclaimed a Masterpiece of the Oral and Intangible Heritage of Humanity in 2003. After the Convention for the Safeguarding of the Intangible Cultural Heritage entered into force, the element was incorporated into the Representative List in 2008.

The recognised element is the shared tradition and its national manifestations, not a single festival held simultaneously in the three countries. The Latvian national inventory uses the title Tradition and Symbolism of Song and Dance Celebrations in Estonia, Latvia and Lithuania. Safeguarding depends on maintaining local amateur ensembles, professional artistic instruction and transmission between generations. UNESCO identifies rural depopulation and the resulting break-up of local amateur groups as principal threats to the tradition.

== Cultural significance ==
Rita Repšienė and Odeta Žukauskienė describe song celebrations as part of the cultural memory and identity of the Baltic states, emphasising their unifying function and the transmission of cultural practice between generations.

Anda Laķe and Rūta Muktupāvela compare attitudes towards the celebrations in Estonia, Latvia and Lithuania, identifying both shared and nationally specific features and examining their role in presenting the Baltic states as "singing nations".

Although linked by the shared UNESCO element, the national celebrations remain distinct recurring events with different programmes, numbering systems, legal frameworks and schedules.

== See also ==
- Singing Revolution
- Tallinn Song Festival Grounds
- Mežaparks Great Bandstand
