= Eurosong =

Eurosong may refer to:

- Eurosong (Belgium), Belgium's annual selection contest for the Eurovision Song Contest
- Eurosong – A MAD Show, Greece's selection contest for the Eurovision Song Contest from 2013 to 2015
- BH Eurosong 2005, Bosnia and Herzegovina's selection contest for the Eurovision Song Contest 2005
- Eurosong 2007, the Czech Republic's selection contest for the Eurovision Song Contest 2007
- Eurosong 2008, Ireland's selection contest for the Eurovision Song Contest 2008
- Eurosong 96, A send off of Ireland's selection contest for the Eurovision as shown in the hit sitcom “Father Ted” in the episode, “A song for Europe"

== See also ==
- Eurovision Song Contest
