= Song contest =

Song contest may refer to:

- Music competition
- A popularity contest amongst previously unreleased songs, notably the Eurovision Song Contest among others
  - WikiProject Song Contests, a WikiProject regarding these types of contests
- Songwriting competition

== See also ==
- Category:Song contests for notable song contests
- Song festival (disambiguation)
