= Asia Vision (TV network) =

U.S. television network

The Asia Vision Television Network is a small multicultural/ethnic television network with affiliate TV stations in three Mid-Atlantic states. The stations are WIAV-LD channel 58, in Washington, D.C. (the flagship station), and WQAV-CD, channel 34 in Glassboro, New Jersey. Also formerly part of the network was WRAV-LP, channel 8 in Ocean City, Maryland, whose license was cancelled by the Federal Communications Commission on October 2, 2020. The network is similar to ImaginAsian in its programming. AsiaVision, Inc. is the sole owner and operator of its affiliate TV stations.
