= Latvian Song and Dance Festival =

Annual song festival in Riga

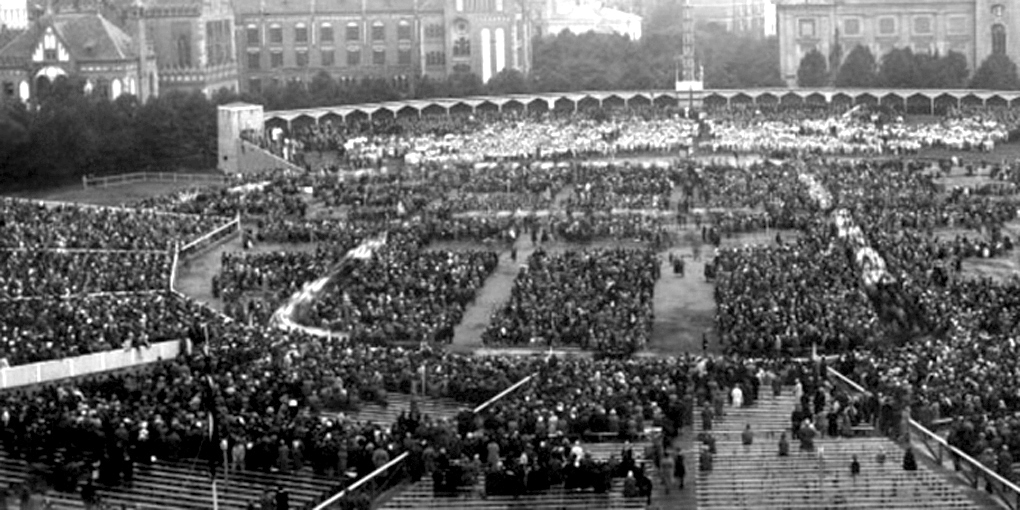
- VII Latvian Song Festival in Riga, 1931
- Genre: choral music, folk music
- Locations: Riga, Latvia
- Years active: 1873–present
- Attendance: approx. 500,000 (2018)
- Website: https://www.dziesmusvetki.lv/

Baltic song and dance celebrations
- UNESCO Intangible Cultural Heritage
- Country: Estonia, Latvia, and Lithuania
- Reference: 00087
- Region: Europe and North America

Inscription history
- Inscription: 2008 (3rd session)
- List: Representative

The Latvian Song and Dance Festival (Latvian: Vispārējie latviešu Dziesmu un Deju svētki) is one of the largest amateur choral and dancing events in the world, and an important event in Latvian culture and social life.

As one of the Baltic song festivals, it is also a part of the UNESCO Masterpieces of the Oral and Intangible Heritage of Humanity list since 2008.

The All-Latvian Song Festival has been held since 1873, normally conducted every five years, with the Latvian Dance Festival component added in 1948. During the festivals, exhibitions of photography, art and folk craft, orchestra concerts, and a festive parade also take place.

Events and competitions leading up to the event occur throughout the period between festivals. Additional festivals were held in 2001 and 2011, both on major anniversaries of the founding of Riga.

Approximately 40,000 performers altogether participate in the event. Folk songs and classical choir songs are sung, with emphasis on a cappella singing, though modern popular songs have recently been incorporated into the repertoire as well.

Since 1960, a distinct Latvian School Youth Song and Dance Festival has been held in an alternate five-year cycle, on a matching scale.

== History ==
=== 1918-1940: Origins, independent Latvia ===
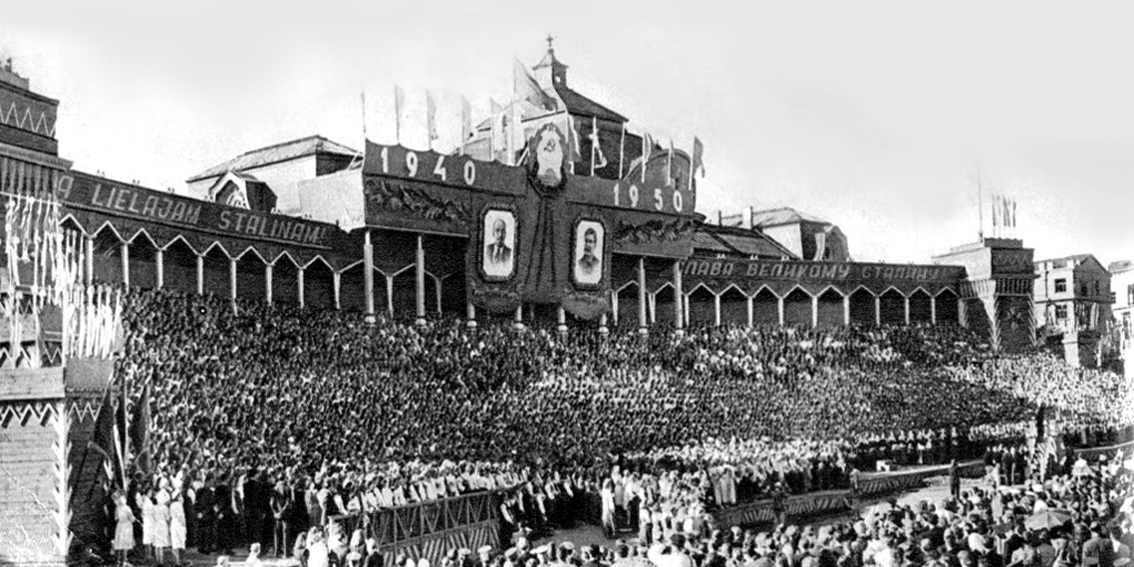
1950 Soviet Latvian Song Festival

The tradition of song festivals originated in the first half of the 19th century in many European countries and later was also organized by the Baltic Germans. The first steps taken in the Latvian environment was during the Song days in Dikļi in 1864, which led to the resounding of a full-scale song festival in Riga during the summer of 1873. 1,003 singers and 30 orchestra players participated in the first festival. Only once has the festival been held outside Riga, in Jelgava in 1895.

After a pause during World War I and the subsequent Latvian War of Independence, the first edition of the festival in independent Latvia was held in 1926 every five years (with an exception for the 1933 edition, which was brought forward three years to coincide with the 60th anniversary of the Song Festival).

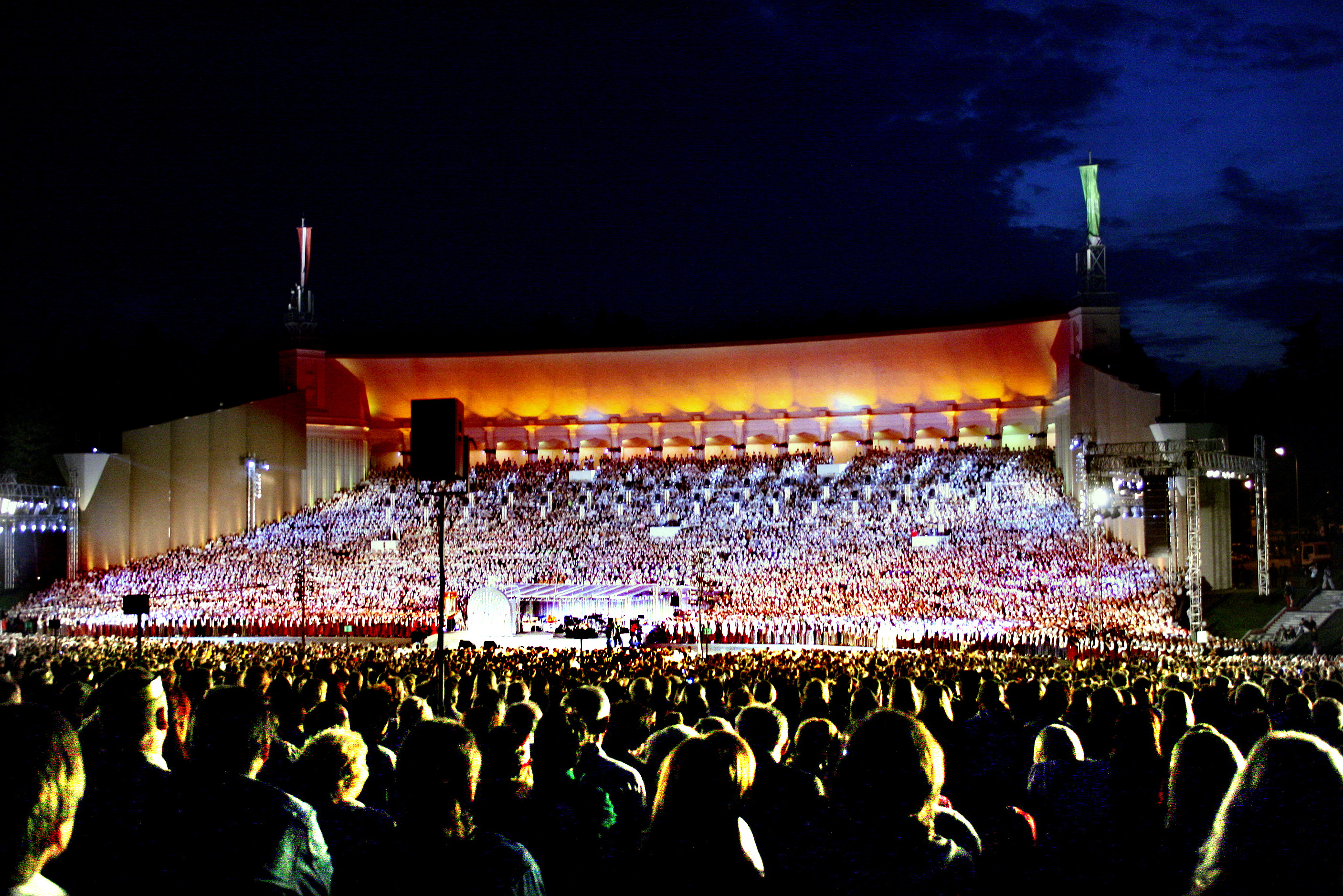
2008 Latvian Song and Dance Festival

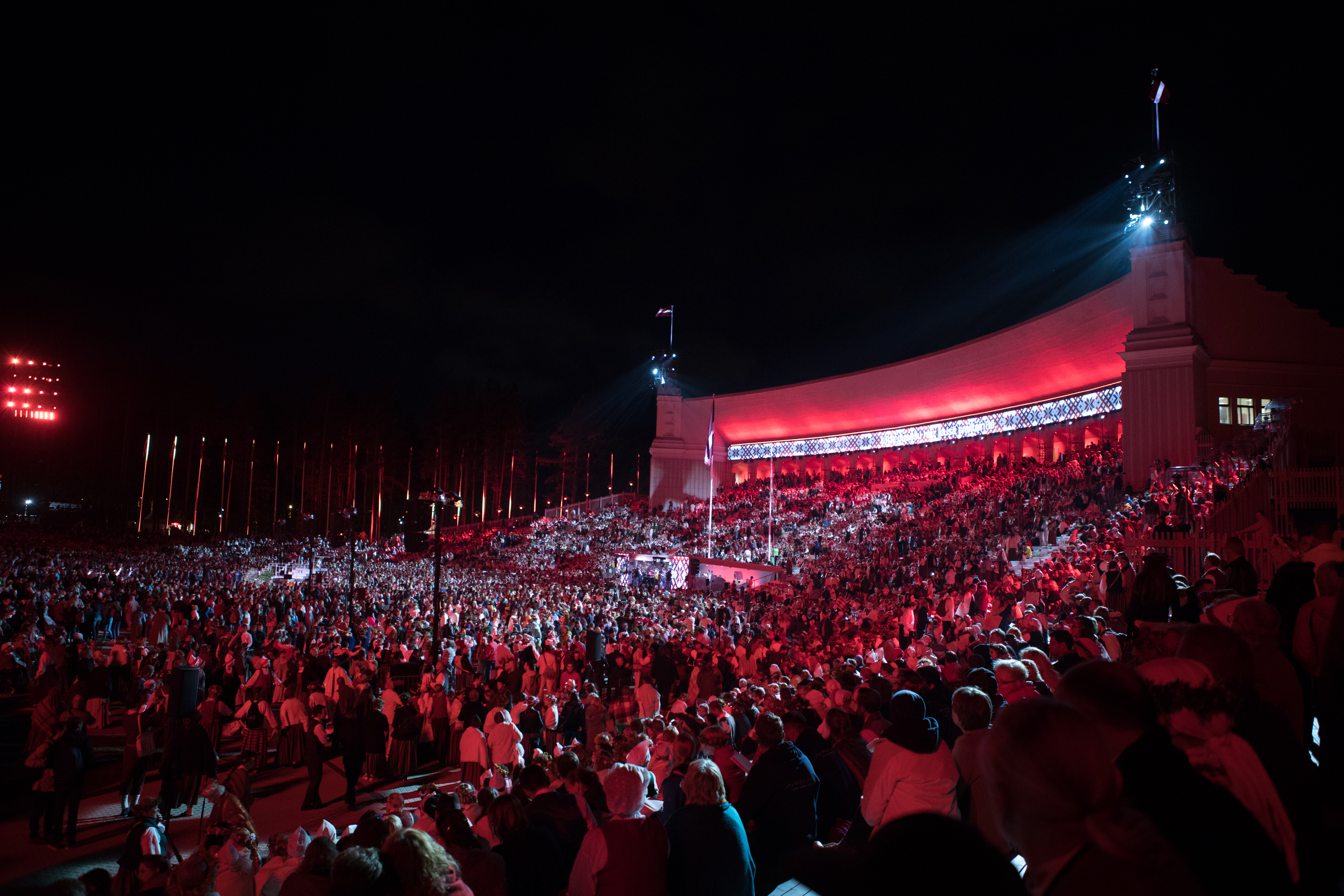
2018 Latvian Song and Dance Festival closing concert "On the Starry Path"

=== 1945–1991: In Latvia ===
After the World War II, festivals were continued in the Latvian SSR, with the festival being held every 5 years on important anniversaries of the nation's forced accession as a Union Republic; while the festival was held in 1973 to mark its centennial anniversary, and in 1977 to mark the diamond jubilee of the October Revolution, both events connected to the centennial commemorations of The First Latvian National Awakening. In 1955, under the supervision of architects V. V. Shnitnikov and G. P. Irbite, the Great Stage of the Riga Culture and Recreation Park "Mežaparks" was built, intended for holding Song Festivals, accommodating 10 thousand singers and 30 thousand spectators in the amphitheater.

The festival tradition was continued in exile by the Latvian diaspora, first in displaced persons camps after World War II and primarily in the western occupation zones in Germany, then in the United States, Canada, and Australia, with many of the legendary conductors of the past taking part during those years alongside the later generations of conductors they trained. The overseas Latvian Song and Dance Festivals is currently held every four or five years, alternating between the United States (15th edition held in 2022 in Minnesota) and Canada (15 editions since 1953, 16th to be held in Toronto in July 2024). Beginning in 1970, Edgars Račevskis was the chief conductor for the festival.

The 1985 edition would be notable for the grand finale concert in which the legendary hymn The Castle of Light conducted by Haralds Mednis, who was hated by the pro-Soviet government and was not listed as one of the performing conductors in that concert, was sung at the behest of the participating choristers. The song, which speaks about the rebirth of a free Latvian nation, was and is usually a staple of the festival's song list and was not performed thrice in its history (1960, 1965 and 1977), and had been performed in the 1980 edition in the presence of Annija Vītola, widow of the song's composer Jāzeps Vītols, marking 80 years since it was first performed.

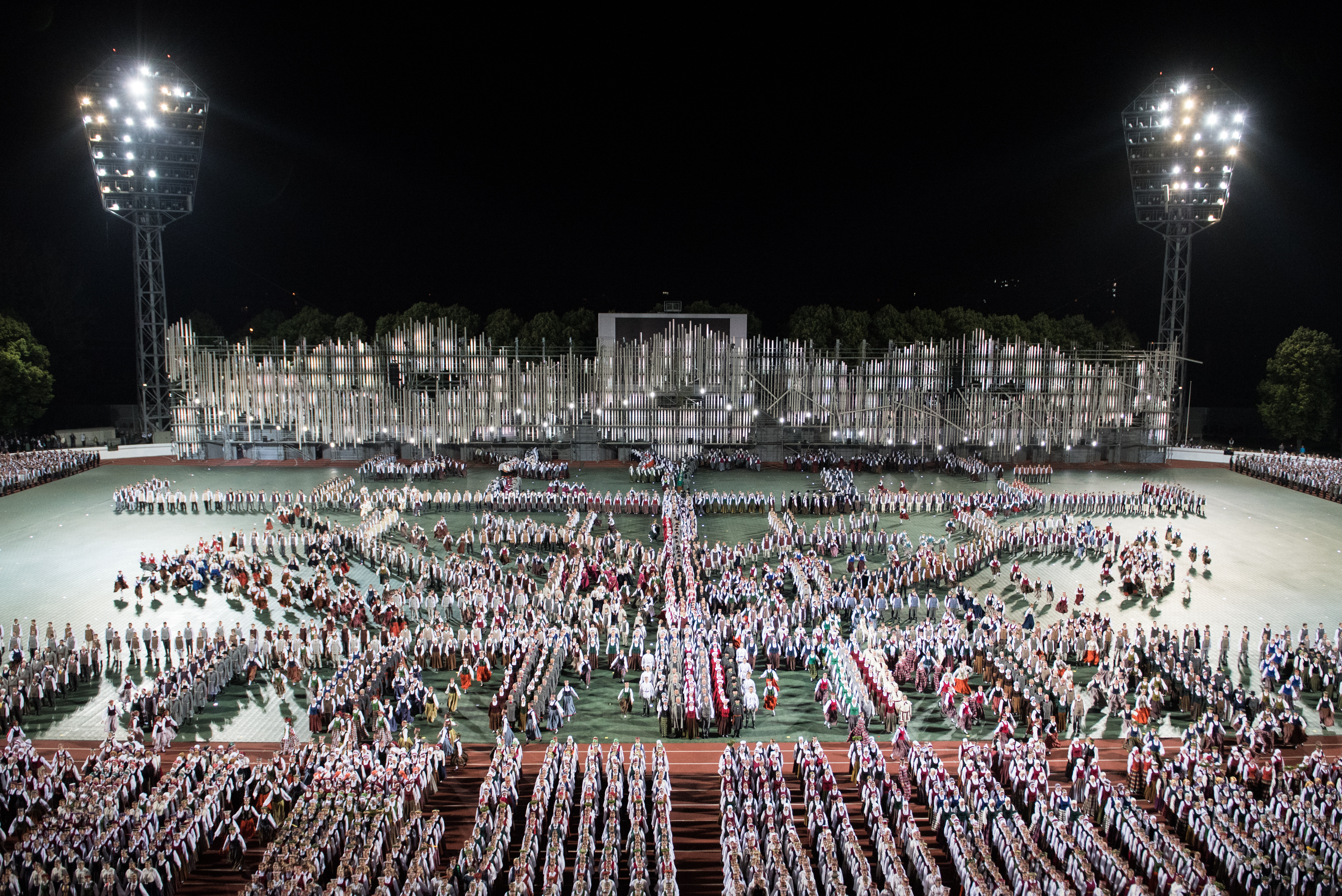
Grand dance performance in 2018

=== 1990–present: Restored Latvian independence ===
The 1990 edition, held during the Singing Revolution, was the first after the restoration of the independence of Latvia and the first to again feature the national anthem and flag of Latvia, as well as multiple songs, all previously banned during the Soviet occupation. It was also attended by many participants and attendees from the Latvian diaspora, with a general mood of "back to the future" look at exile homecoming.

The 24th Festival was held in July 2008. The main events were held at the Mežaparks Great Bandstand and the Daugava Stadium in Riga. The 25th Festival took place in July 2013.

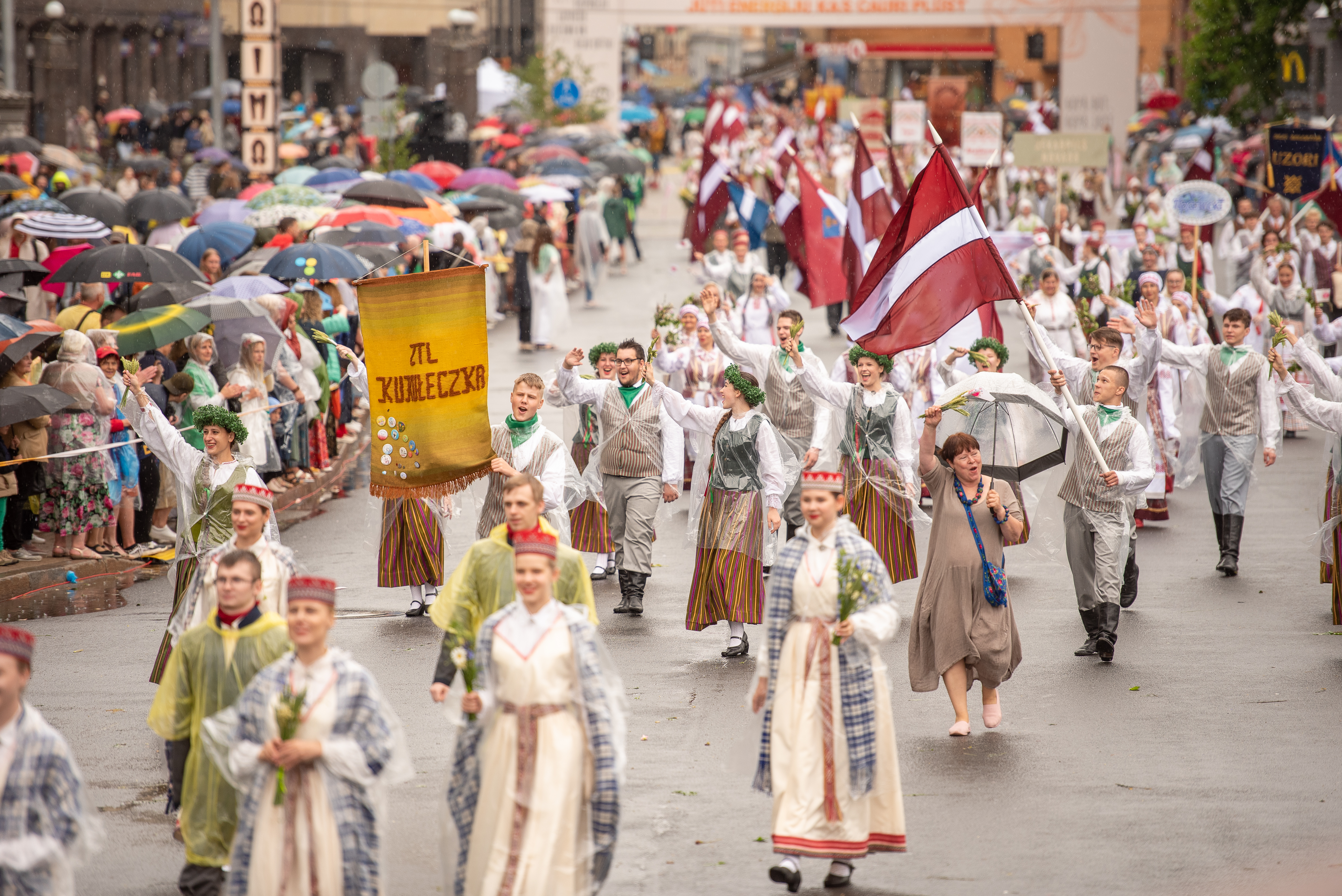
Participant parade in 2023

In 2018, 81,309 of the 95,250 available tickets for the 26th Festival's various events were sold on the first day. The festival took place from 1 to 8 July, marking the 100th anniversary of Latvian independence, encompassing 65 events with a total of 500,000 expected visitors. The closing concert, in which a choir of 16,000 singers and other participants performed, and the subsequent sing-along night was attended by more than 67 thousand people, making it the highest attendance to an event in the festival's history. The 2018 edition remains as the highest attended edition, with nearly 43,300 participants.

The 27th edition took place in July 2023, marking the festival's sesquicentennial jubilee anniversary and the diamond jubilee year of the Latvian Dance Festival. For the first time in the history of the event, a song with Livonian lyrics was featured. Lībieši nāk (Latvian: 'Livonians are coming'), the 2nd part of the musical cycle Nācēji by Inese Zandere and Valts Pūce was performed during the Grand Choir Concert Tīrums. Dziesmas ceļš. This edition featured the second-highest number of participants — 40,560, surpassed only by the 2018 edition.

== See also ==
- Estonian Song Festival
- Lithuanian Song Festival
