= Estonian Song Festival =

Music celebration in Estonia

Estonian Song Celebration Üldlaulupidu
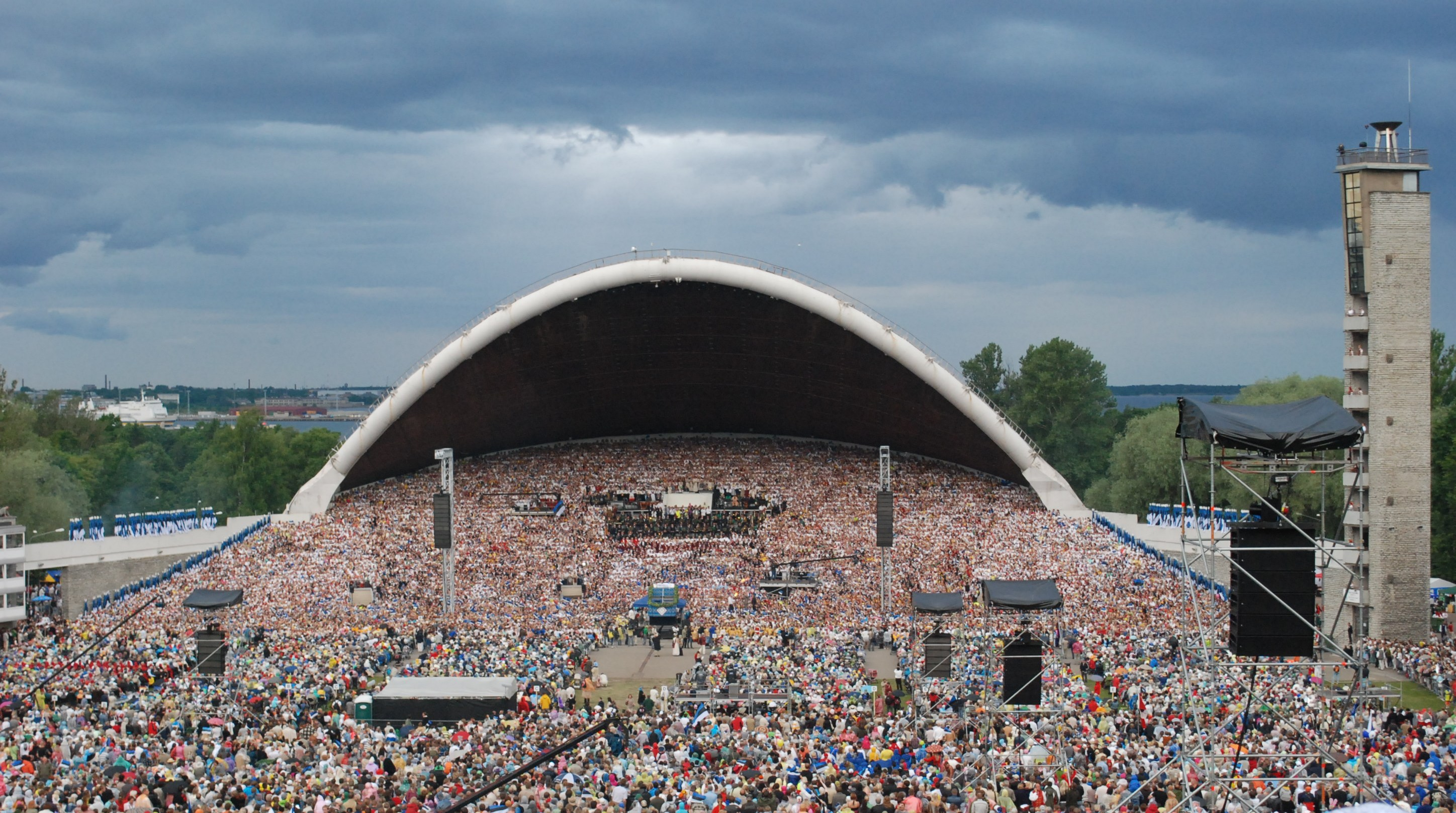
- A moment before the opening of the 25th Estonian Song Celebration (2009)
- Genre: Choral festival
- Date: July
- Frequency: Five-year
- Venue: Tallinn Song Festival Grounds
- Locations: Tallinn, Estonia
- Inaugurated: 1869
- Website: https://www.laulupidu.ee

Baltic song and dance celebrations
- UNESCO Intangible Cultural Heritage
- Country: Estonia, Latvia, and Lithuania
- Reference: 00087
- Region: Europe and North America

Inscription history
- Inscription: 2008 (3rd session)
- List: Representative

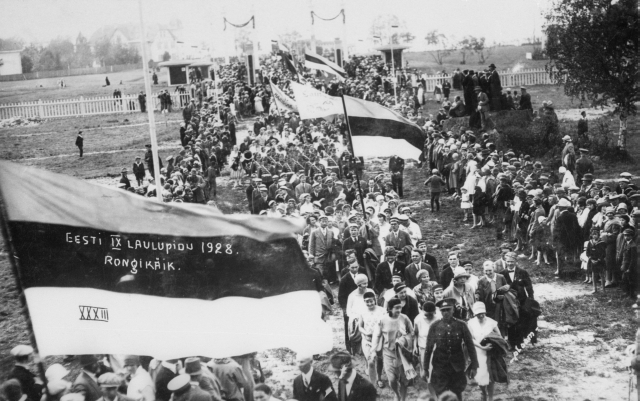
The festive procession of the IX Estonian Song Celebration, 1928

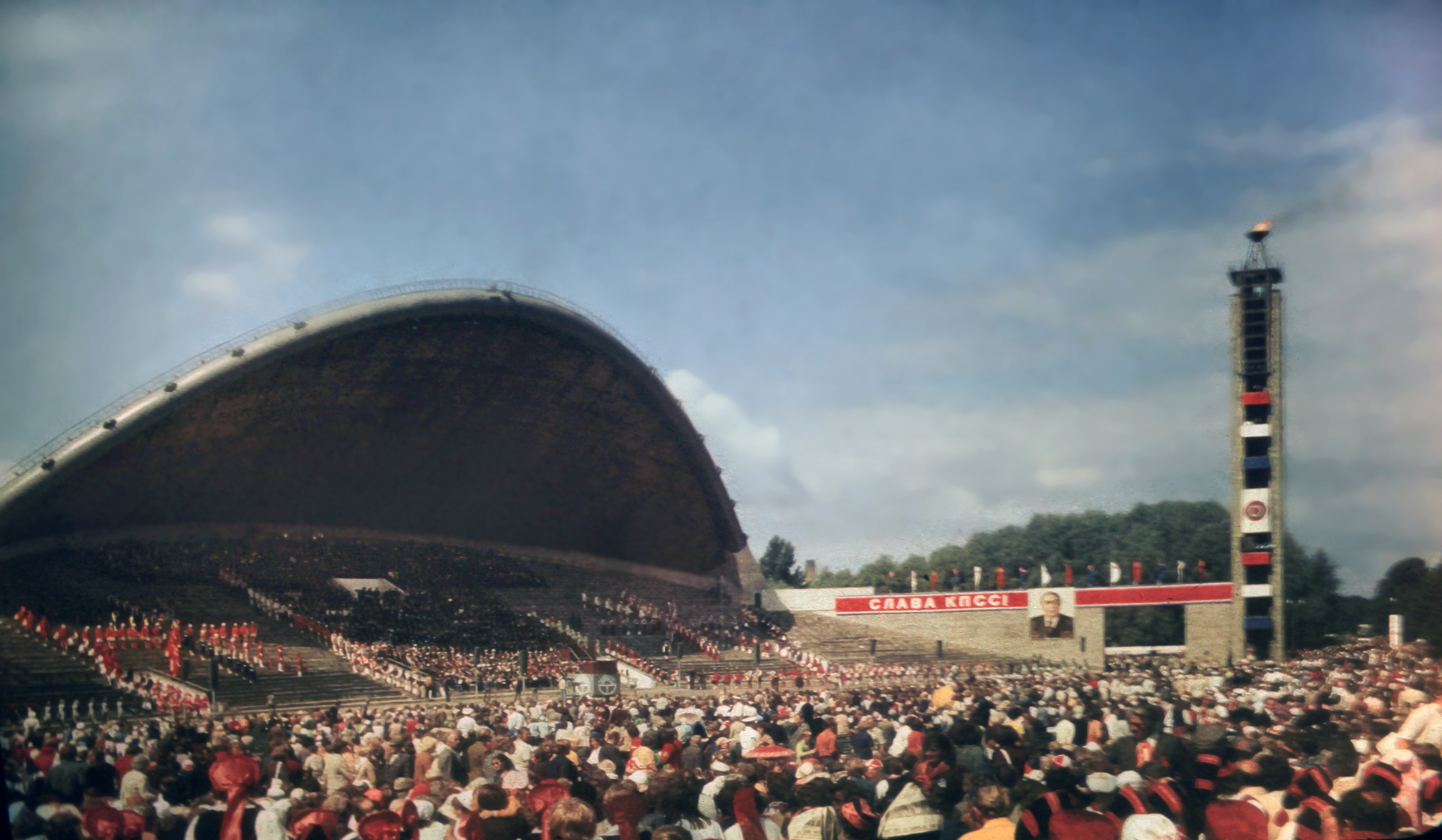
XIX Song Celebration in Soviet-occupied Tallinn, 1980

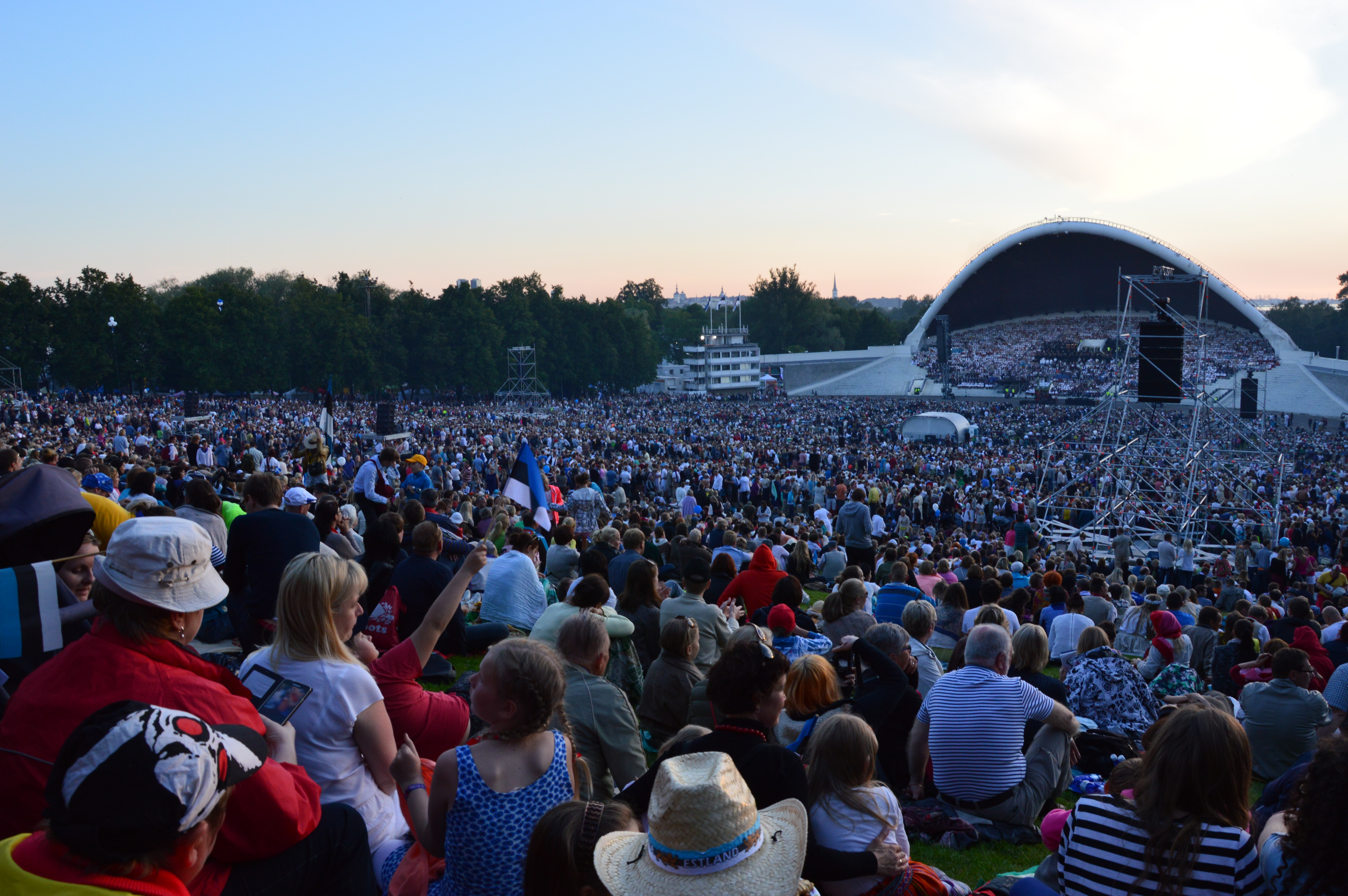
XXVI Song Celebration in 2014

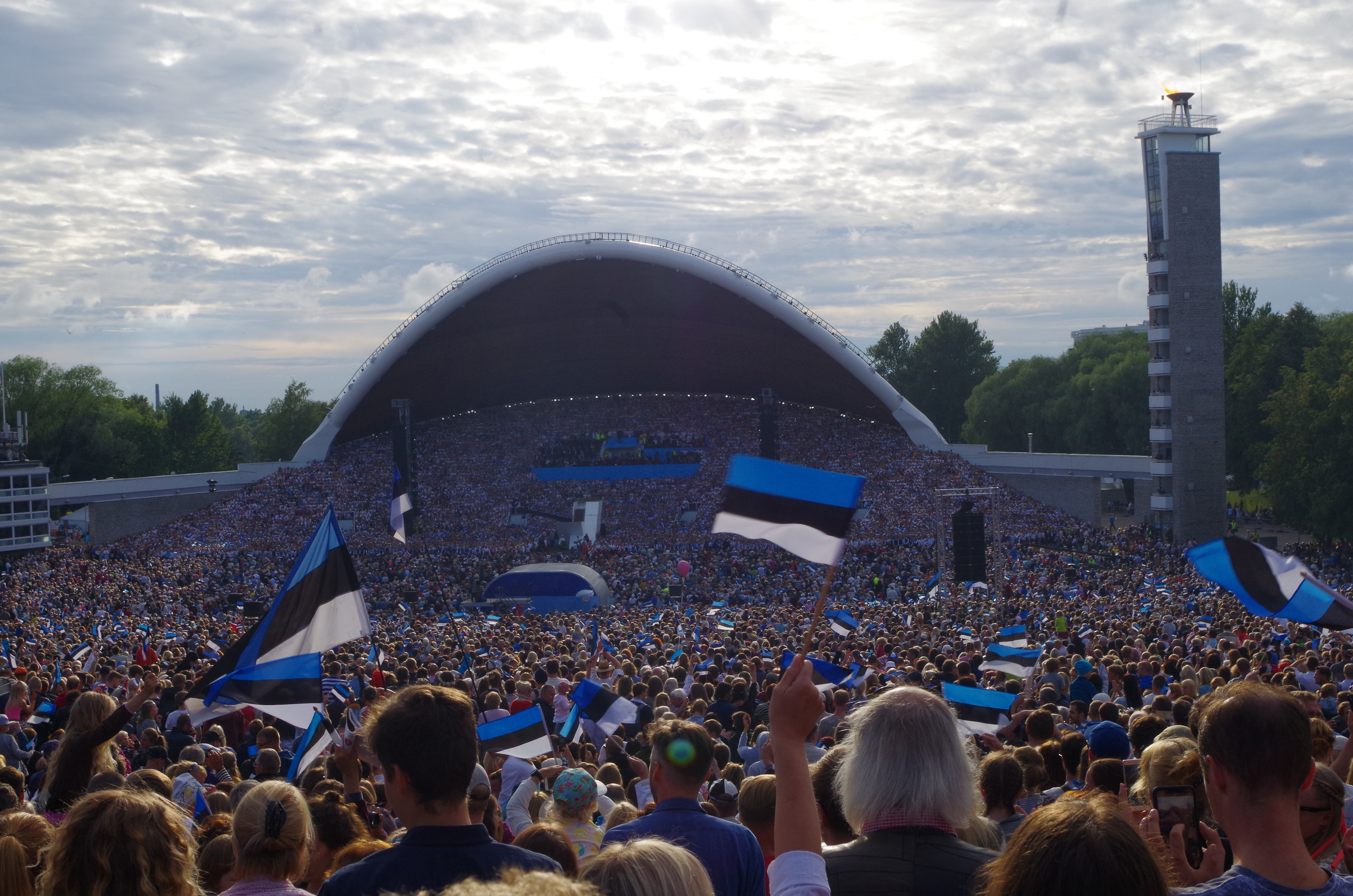
XXVII Song Celebration in 2019

The Estonian National Song Festival or Estonian Song Celebration (Estonian: Eesti Üldlaulupidu, lit. 'Estonia-wide singing party'), commonly called Laulupidu, held since 1869, is one of the largest choral events in the world, a Masterpiece of the Oral and Intangible Heritage of Humanity. Since 1923, it has been typically staged every five years in June or July, and since 1928 always in the same purpose-built venue: the Song Festival Grounds in the Kadriorg district of the capital city Tallinn. The joint choir has comprised more than 30,000 singers performing to an audience of 80,000.

== History ==
The tradition of the song festivals (laulupidu, Sängerfest) was born along with Estonian national awakening. The first Estonia-wide laulupidu was held in Tartu in the summer of 1869. One of the organisers of the first song festival was Johann Voldemar Jannsen. In the first three events only men's choirs and brass orchestras participated. 822 singers and 56 brass players participated in the first. Starting with the fourth, mixed choirs were also participating. Starting with the sixth in 1896, the celebration tradition moved to Tallinn.

The Dance and Gymnastic Festival (part of the first Estonian Games held in 1934) was the predecessor of subsequent Estonian Dance Festivals which are now held, by tradition, at the same time with the Song Celebration in Tallinn.

After the Soviet invasion and occupation of Estonia during World War II, the tradition of Estonia-wide song festivals was permitted to continue. However, during all the Song Festivals from 1947 to 1985, the singing of the Estonian national anthem and the display of the flag of Estonia or any other "anti-Soviet" symbols was strictly prohibited. The Soviet occupation authorities instead forced communist anthems into the repertoire along with songs mandatorily glorifying the Soviet Communist Party and its leaders Vladimir Lenin and Joseph Stalin. Because of the inclusion of children's and boys' choirs the total number of participants rose to 25,000 – 30,000 people.

Since 1990, almost every Song Celebration has featured the most symbolic Estonian songs "Mu isamaa on minu arm", "Ta lendab mesipuu poole", and the national anthem "Mu isamaa, mu õnn ja rõõm".

In 2019, the number of visitors to the song celebration reached its maximum. Nearly 60,000 tickets were sold from the pre-sale for the XXVII Song Celebration concert, and together with the 35,000 singers and musicians participating, a situation had been reached where the pre-sale of tickets was suspended by the decision of the organisers for the safety and security of people.

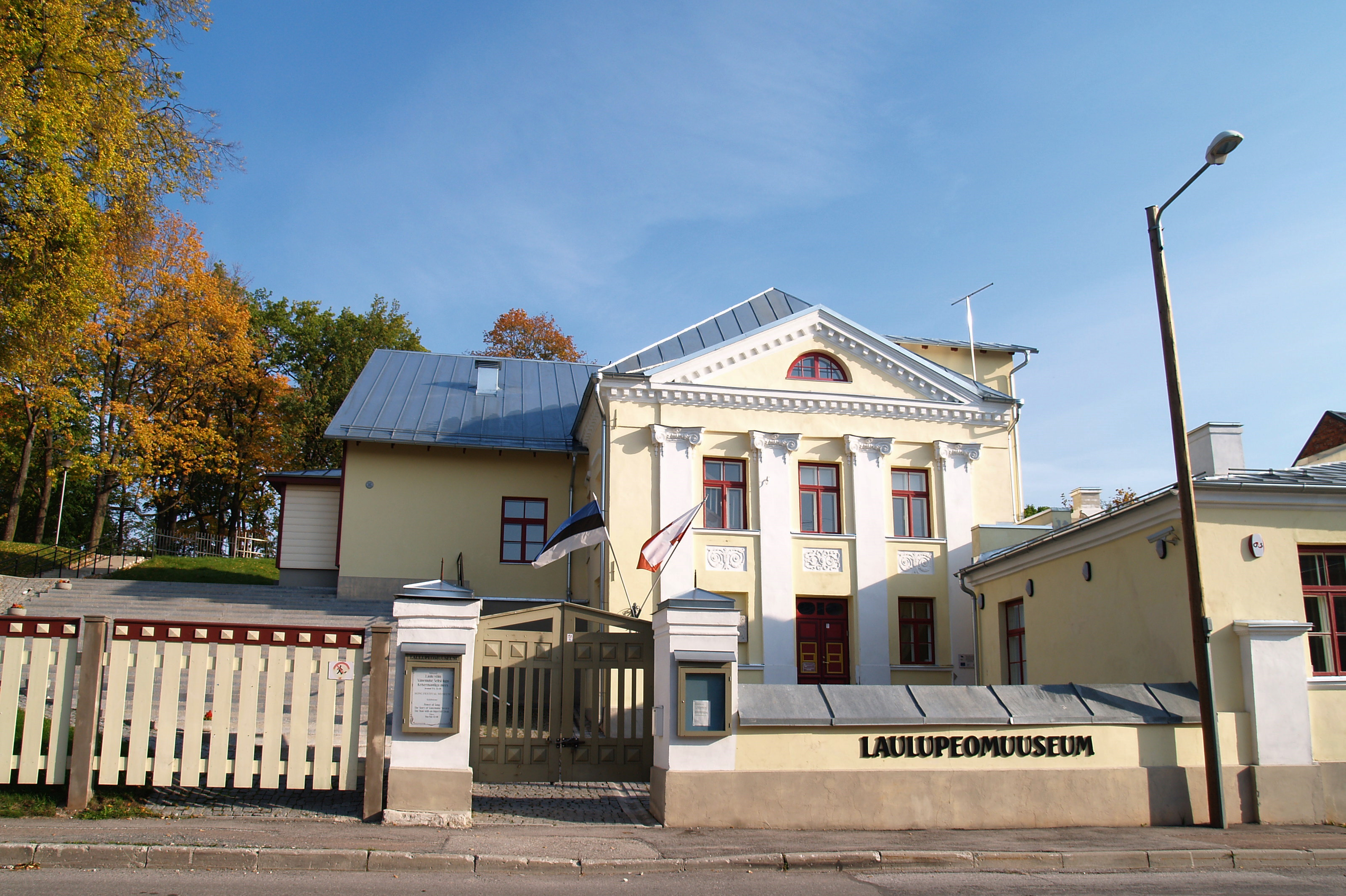
Song Festival Museum in Tartu

== List of Song Celebrations ==
List of Song Celebrations
Song Celebration	Year	Place	Choirs	Performers
I Song Celebration	1869	Tartu	51	845
II Song Celebration	1879	Tartu	64	1,272
III Song Celebration	1880	Tallinn	48	782
IV Song Celebration	1891	Tartu	179	2,700
V Song Celebration	1894	Tartu	263	3,951
VI Song Celebration	1896	Tallinn	410	5,681
VII Song Celebration	1910	Tallinn	527	10,000
VIII Song Celebration	1923	Tallinn	386	10,562
IX Song Celebration	1928	Tallinn	436	15,049
X Song Celebration	1933	Tallinn	500	16,500
XI Song Celebration	1938	Tallinn	569	17,501
XII Song Celebration	1947	Tallinn	703	25,760
XIII Song Celebration	1950	Tallinn	1,106	31,907
XIV Song Celebration	1955	Tallinn	893	30,321
XV Song Celebration	1960	Tallinn	875	29,273
XVI Song Celebration	1965	Tallinn	690	25,806
XVII Song Celebration	1969	Tallinn	771	30,230
XVIII Song Celebration	1975	Tallinn	641	28,537
XIX Song Celebration	1980	Tallinn	627	28,969
XX Song Celebration	1985	Tallinn	677	26,437
XXI Song Celebration	1990	Tallinn	690	28,922
XXII Song Celebration	1994	Tallinn	811	25,802
XXIII Song Celebration	1999	Tallinn	856	24,875
XXIV Song Celebration	2004	Tallinn	850	22,759
XXV Song Celebration	2009	Tallinn	864	26,430
XXVI Song Celebration	2014	Tallinn	1,046	33,025
XXVII Song Celebration	2019	Tallinn	1,020	32,302
XXVIII Song Celebration	2025	Tallinn	990	31,027
XXIX Song Celebration	2028	Tallinn	N/A	N/A

== See also ==
- Latvian Song and Dance Festival
- Lithuanian Song and Dance Festival
- Singing Revolution
