= Lithuanian Song and Dance Festival =

Dance and song festival in Lithuania

Lithuanian Song and Dance Festival Lietuvių dainų ir šokių šventė
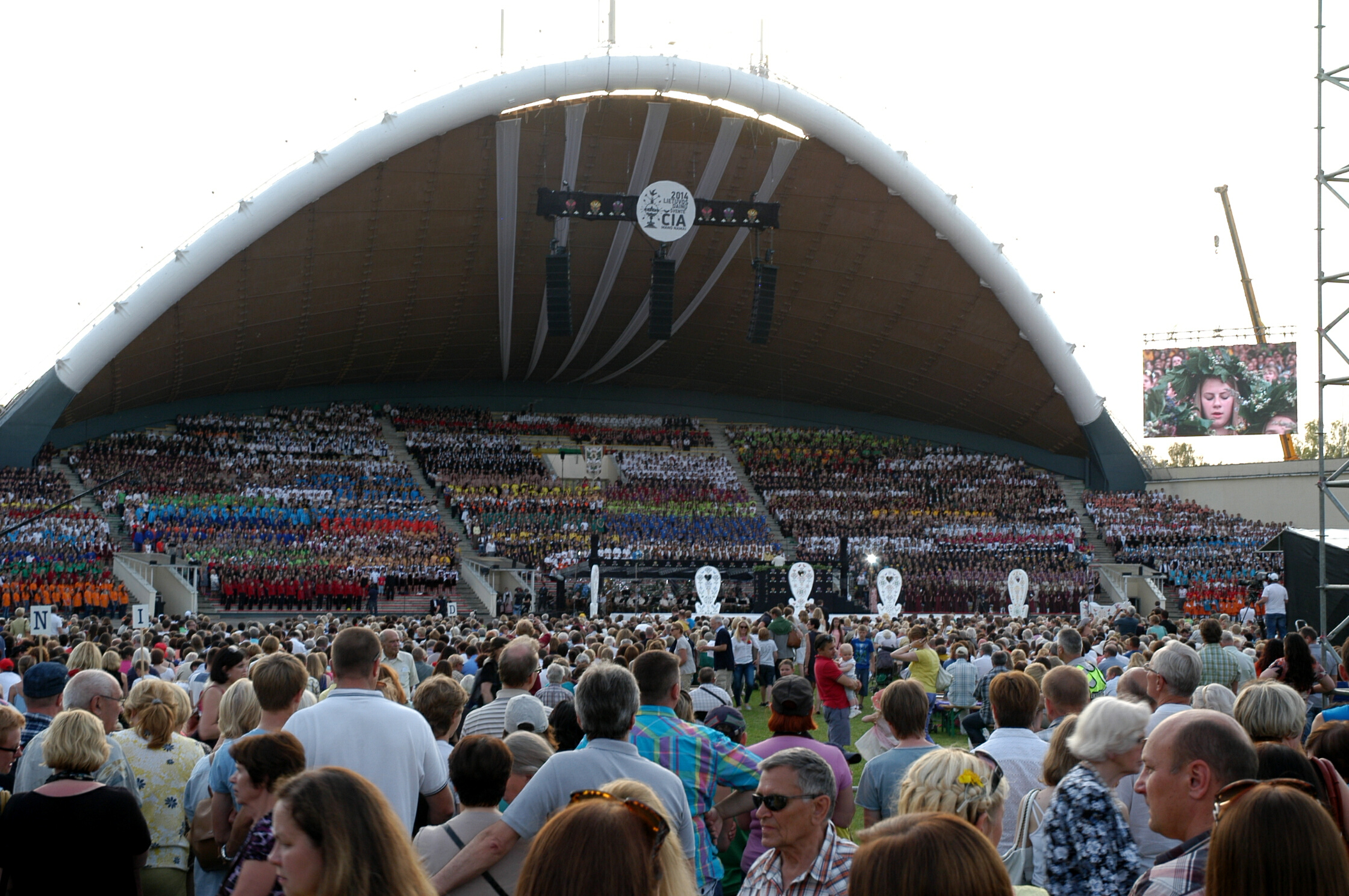
- Festival (2014)
- Genre: Song and dance festival
- Frequency: Five-year
- Venue: Vingis Park
- Locations: Vilnius, Lithuania
- Inaugurated: 23 August 1924
- Website: dainusvente.lt

Baltic song and dance celebrations
- UNESCO Intangible Cultural Heritage
- Country: Estonia, Latvia, and Lithuania
- Reference: 00087
- Region: Europe and North America

Inscription history
- Inscription: 2008 (3rd session)
- List: Representative

The Lithuanian Song and Dance Festival (Lithuanian: Lietuvių dainų ir šokių šventė), colloquially known also as the Song Celebration (Lithuanian: Dainų šventė) is a Lithuanian massive traditional song and dance festival. It takes place roughly every four years. The event has been a national celebration throughout the interwar and upon Lithuania regaining its independence in 1990. The main event is traditionally hosted at Vingis Park in Vilnius.

On 7 November 2003, UNESCO proclaimed the tradition of the Song and Dance Celebration in Lithuania, Latvia and Estonia as a Masterpiece of the Oral and Intangible Heritage of Humanity and in 2008 added it to the List of the Intangible Cultural Heritage. Tradition of Song and Dance Celebrations in Estonia, Latvia and Lithuania are also inscribed into The Intangible Cultural Heritage Inventory of Lithuania as a form of social practice, ritual and festive events.

== History ==
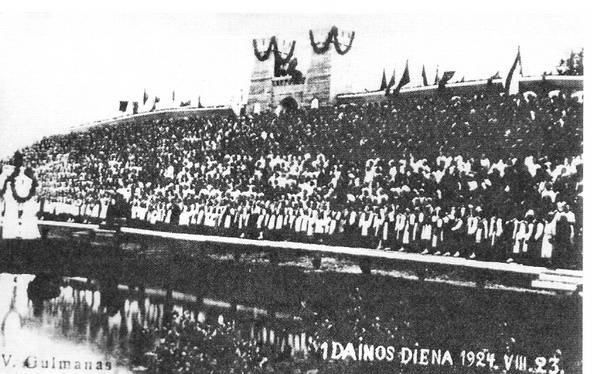
The First Lithuanian Song Festival held in Kaunas in 1924

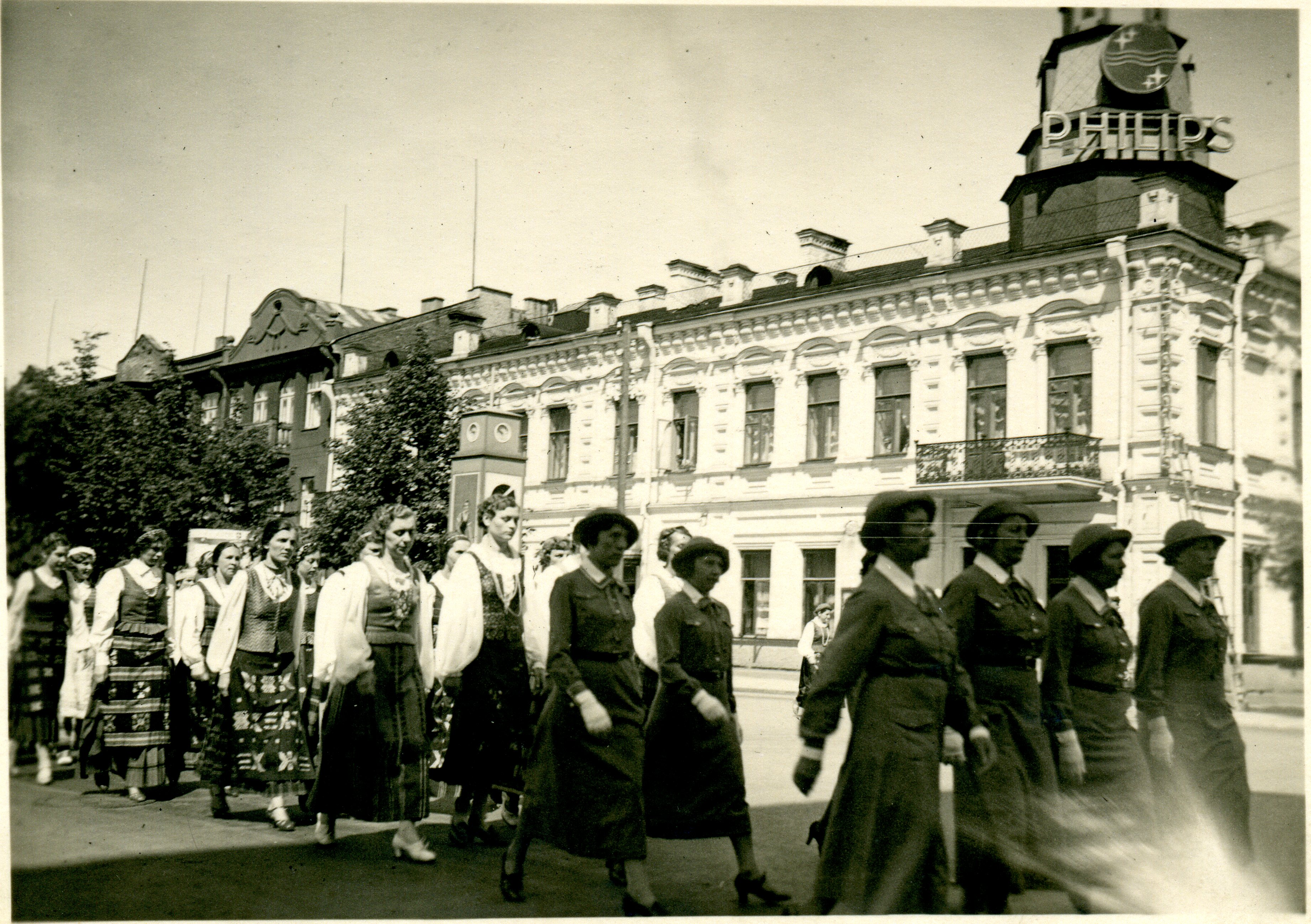
Participants of the festival in 1937

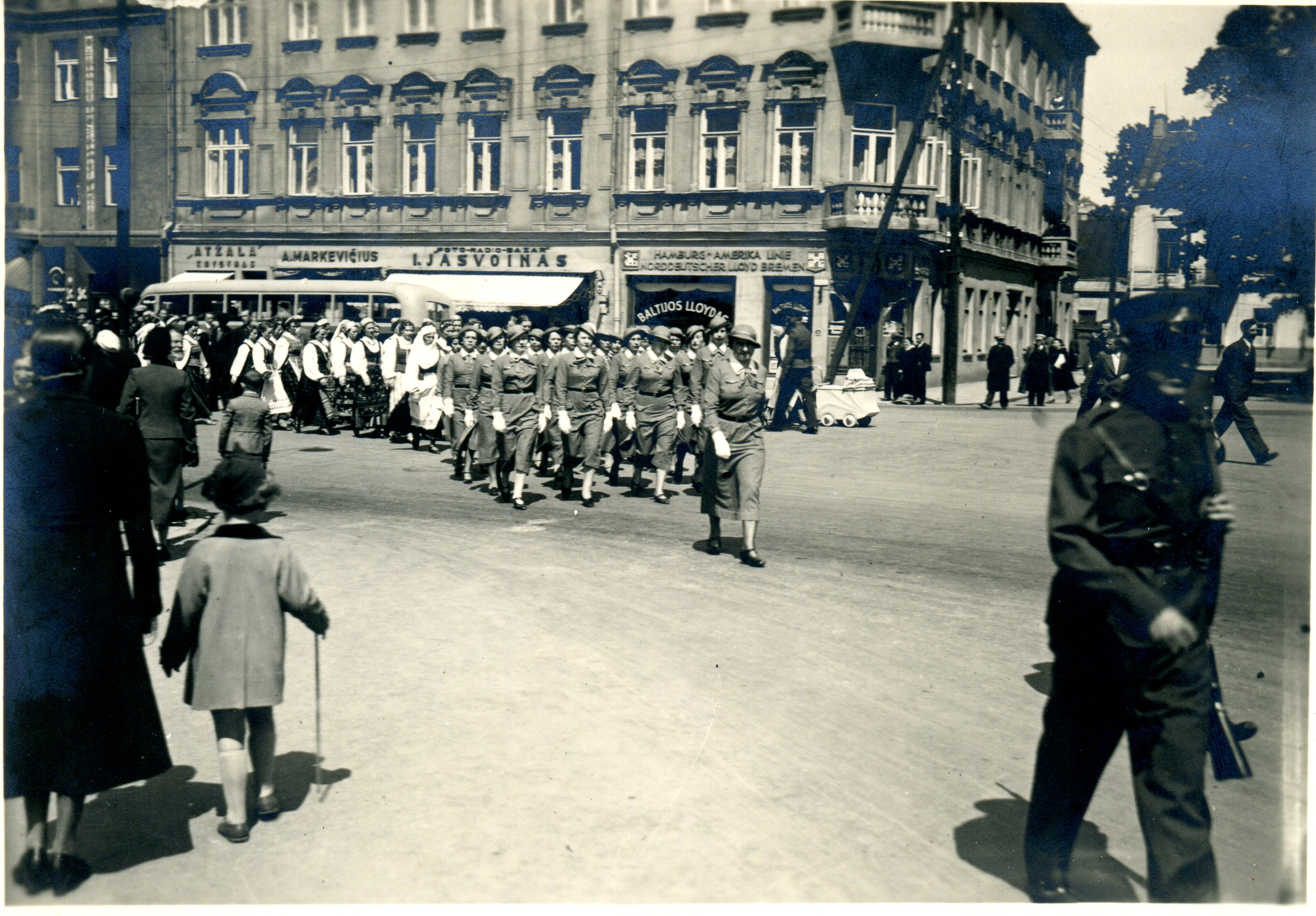
Song festival in Kaunas in 1937

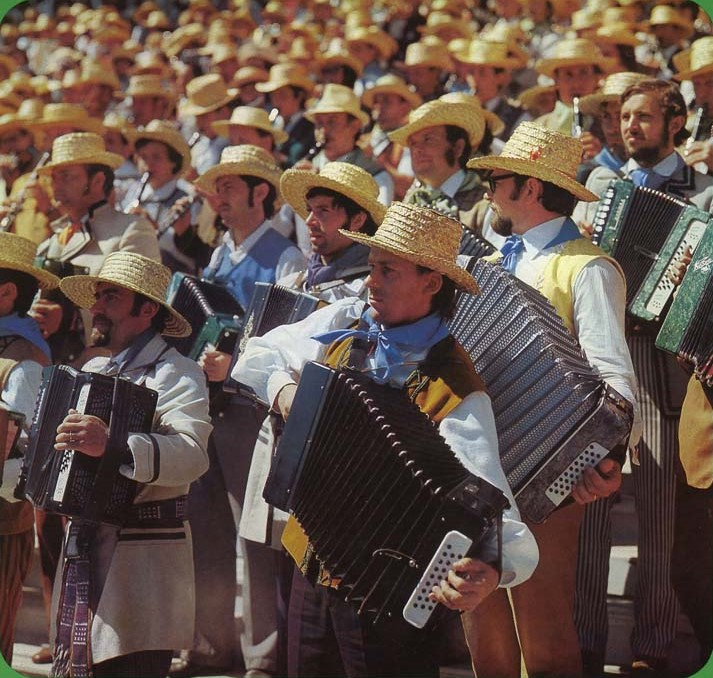
Accordion players during the Soviet-era festival

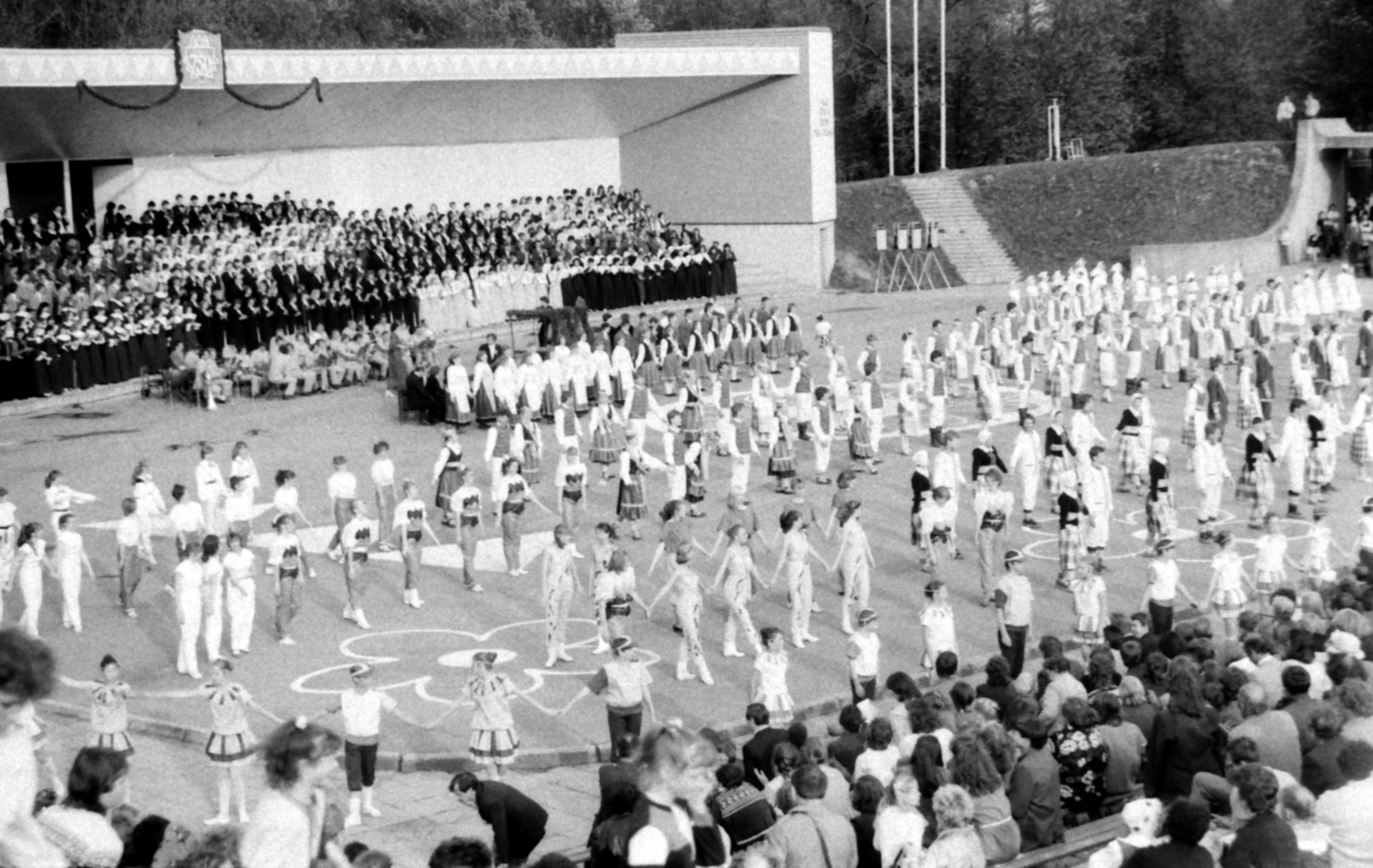
Song festival in Šiauliai in 1986

=== 19th-century Song Festival in the Lithuania Minor ===
At the end of the 19th century, the Rambynas Hill, in the Lithuania Minor region, became the favourite place for singing and gathering of artists. The 17 February 1895 is recorded in history as the debut of the first Lithuanian choir. The concert was held to celebrate the 10th anniversary of the Lithuanian Birutė Society.

On 2 December 1895, the Tilsit Lithuanian Singers’ Community was founded and led by Vydūnas (Vilius Storosta). The community used to organise theatre performances, concerts, evenings, and St. John's Day festivities in Tilsit, Klaipėda, Gumbinė, Verdainė, Rusnė, Ragainė, Juodkrantė, Smalininkai. Up to one thousand spectators used to gather at the events, the so-called winter and summer Lithuanian celebrations, which later in 1902 were re-titled as the Song Celebrations.

On 6 June 1927, the first Lithuanian Song Festival of Klaipėda Region took place. 12 choirs comprising 800 singers and 100 orchestras took part in the event. The joint choir was conducted by Antanas Vaičiūnas and Vydūnas. In 1928, the Second Song Festival of Klaipėda was organized in Šilutė.

=== In interwar Lithuania ===
The first song festival in Interwar Lithuania was held on 23–25 August 1924 in Petras Vileišis Square, Kaunas, during the Agricultural and Industrial Exhibition. The festival's initiator was Juozas Žilevičius, with chief conductors Juozas Naujalis, Stasys Šimkus and Julius Štarka. The choirs' conductor was Kostas Gurevičius, Mykolas Karka, Apolinaras Likerauskas, Vladas Paulauskas and Antanas Vaičiūnas. 77 choirs participated, comprising 3,000 singers, attracting 50,000 spectators.

Since then, the song festival has become a tradition in Lithuania. The Second Lithuanian Song Festival was dedicated to the 10th anniversary of Lithuania's Independence and took place on 1–2 July 1928 in Kaunas. The appearances included 51 church choirs, 22 choirs of gymnasia and other schools, 19 choirs of various associations and organizations, and the choir of the Riga's Lithuanian "Lights" (headed by Juozas Karosas), featuring 6,000 singers. The joint choir was conducted by Stasys Šimkus and Juozas Gruodis. During the celebration, 250 gymnastics exercises took place at the school square. They were accompanied by a choir that was singing popular folk songs. The Second Song Festival was attended by about 100,000 spectators.

The third song festival was held on 20 June 1930 and was dedicated to commemorating the 500th anniversary of Vytautas the Great's death. About 200 choirs and 9,000 singers participated in the event. The event performed 24 pieces - one psalm, six original pieces and many harmonized folk songs. The chief conductors were Juozas Naujalis, Nikodemas Martinonis, and Juozas Gruodis.

The first folklore dance festival is held on 29 October 1937. A celebration was organized in Kaunas by the Lithuania Youth. 448 dancers from different regions of Lithuania performed a number of national folklore dances.

Between 1920 and 1944, numerous regional, city and other local song festivals were held, and organized by various public organizations. Since 1930 some regional song and sports festivals have been held for schoolchildren.

=== In Lithuanian SSR ===
The tradition of song festivals was continued during the Soviet occupation. In 1946, 188 choirs with 11,778 singers participated in the song festival and performed songs composed by 15 composers and included 15 Lithuanian harmonized songs. The chief Conductors for the 1946 edition were Nikodemas Martinonis, Jonas Švedas, Konradas Kaveckas and Antanas Ilčiukas.

From 1950 on, the National Dance Day was added to the Song Festival. The festival was attended by 57 dance groups, 41 ensembles and 13 concert bands.

Since 1950, the song and dance festival events have been organized periodically every 5 years. The tradition of song and dance festivals, like other arts, contained the dogma of Soviet aesthetics and politics, and Lithuanian art was supposed to be a form of nationalism, but with socialist content.

The Vingis Park Amphitheater was opened in time for the 1960 edition of the festival. The amphitheatre was based on a modified design of the Estonian Song Festival Grounds in Tallinn.

The Youth Song Festival has sprung up from the song and dance festival tradition. It became popular and became an independent event, held periodically since 1964.

=== Lithuanian diaspora ===
Lithuanian diasporas also held the song festivals. The first Lithuanian diaspora song festival was organized in Würzburg, Germany, in 1956. The most recent festival was held July 5th, 2015, in Chicago, IL, with 1,400 singers participating.

=== Since 1990 ===
After the restoration of Lithuania's independence in 1990, the Lithuanian Song Festival reverted to its traditional identity and gained the status of a national tradition. The festival is considered to be the unique manifestation of the national culture and the symbol of unity and strength. The song festival's primary parts are Folklore Day, unfolding the geographical and genre diversity of traditional culture, and the Ensembles Night. Lithuanian Song Celebration survives as an ongoing cultural development process. The Celebration includes more than 40,000 participants – both amateur and professional ensembles, artists, also cultural and educational institutions.

Consisting of 4 main parts the Celebration usually is held for 7 days. The four main parts are Folklore Day, which is dedicated to the traditional culture, the Ensembles’ Evening, which is dedicated to folk dance, song and instrumental groups, Dance Day, presenting massive choreographic compositions, and Song Day. The distinctive feature of the celebration is singing a cappella. For this Song Day usually gathers more than 20,000 singers to perform both arranged folk and modern songs of Lithuanian composers, some modern songs being the staple of Lithuanian mass culture.

№ of Festival	Year	Comments	Number of participants
13	1990	The event was called the National Song Day. Lithuania was under the Blockade and many participants from abroad were unable to attend.	33,000 participants
14	1994	The event regained the World Lithuanians Song Festival name.	26,000 participants from Lithuania and 1,200 Lithuanians from abroad
15	1998	The event was commemorating the 80th anniversary of the first Lithuanian independence reinstatement.	31,000 participants from Lithuania and 1,100 Lithuanians from abroad
16	2003	The event was dubbed "We".	32,000 participants from Lithuania and 1,000 Lithuanians from abroad
17	2007	The event was named The Circle of Life.	36,600 participants
18	2009	The event carried the name The Acapella of the Centuries.	40,000 participants
19	2014	The 19th Lithuanian Song Festival was named This Is My Home. The event featured a grand opening by the President of Lithuania Dalia Grybauskaitė. National Costume Day was held for the first time at the festival. The Folklore Day opened the festival, starring 6,000 performers in Sereikiskiu Park. The final day in Vingis Park showcased 12,000 singers in 400 choirs.	Over 37,000 people were expected to attend the festival.
20	2018	The 2018 edition of the Song Celebration was dedicated to the Centenary of the Restoration of the independent state of Lithuania and took place in Kaunas and Vilnius. The President of Lithuania Dalia Grybauskaitė opened the event. On 6 July at 21:00, the Lithuanian national anthem was sung simultaneously in various Lithuanian towns as well as abroad. It was transmitted live on the state television and was viewed by a record 300,000 viewers. 2 euro commemorative coin was issued to commemorate the event.	
21	2024	The centennial 21st Lithuanian Song Festival took place from 29 June to 6 July 2024.	

== See also ==
- Estonian Song Festival
- Latvian Song and Dance Festival
