= Aleksander Kunileid =

Estonian composer (1845–1875)

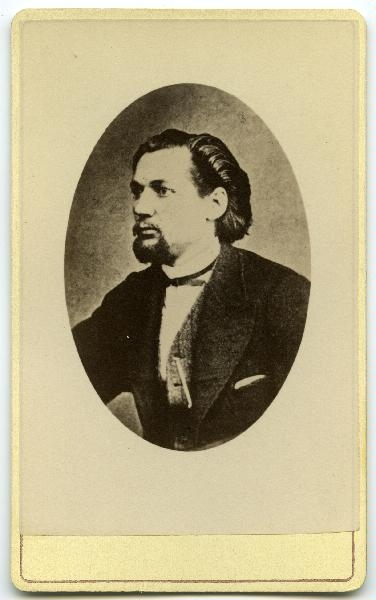
- Kunileid
- Born: Aleksander Saebelmann; 22 November 1845; Audru, Kreis Pernau, Governorate of Livonia
- Died: 27 July 1875 (aged 29); Poltava, Poltava Governorate
- Citizenship: Russian

Aleksander Kunileid (born Aleksander Saebelmann; 22 November 1845 – 27 July 1875), was an Estonian composer. He is one of the founding figures of Estonian choral music.

== Life and work ==
Aleksander Peeter Karl Saebelmann (or Säbelmann) was born in 1845 in Audru in the district of Pärnu, the son of a teacher. Like his brother, Friedrich August Saebelmann, he displayed musical gifts from an early age. His first musical education was with his father, from whom he learned to play the organ and the piano. As a 16-year-old, Saebelmann attended the Vidzeme teacher's seminary in Valka (the Latvian town of Valka lies alongside its Estonian twin, Valga), where he studied with the choral master Jānis Cimze.

Saebelmann graduated from the teacher's seminary in 1865 and took up a teaching post in the small village of Paistu for three years. There he frequently played the organ in the local church. He befriended prominent figures from the Estonian national awakening, including Carl Robert Jakobson, Johann Voldemar Jannsen, and the latter's daughter, Lydia Koidula. He took the name "Kunileid", in preference to the Germanic-seeming "Saebelmann", from Jakobson's motto Otsi, kuni leiad ("Seek, until you find"). In 1868 he was employed as an assistant instructor by the Vidzeme seminary.

At Jakobson's instigation Kunileid played a significant role in the first Estonian Song Festival in 1869. Alongside Jannsen, Kunileid was the chief organizer of the festival, as well as chairman of the jury for choral performances.

During this period, Kunileid composed numerous choral songs, including Mu isamaa on minu arm, Sind surmani and Mu isamaa nad olid matnud, which today form part of the Estonian national canon. Jakobson included Kunileid's works in his famous collection of Estonian songs, Wanemuine Kandle Healed (first edition 1869, second 1871).

In 1871, Kunileid moved with this brother, Friedrich Saebelmann, who had also graduated from the teacher's seminary in Valka, to Saint Petersburg. At first the pair had to live in very restricted circumstances. Kunileid was a teacher in the Estonian school in Gatchina, near the Russian capital, and later at the teacher's seminary of Kolpino. In 1873 Kunileid's health declined rapidly and he moved to Poltava as a teacher and organist for its better climate. He died there in the summer of 1875. He was buried in Poltava's municipal cemetery, which was levelled after World War II.

Kunileid is a minor character in Jaan Kross's historical novel, Professor Martens' Departure.

== Selected compositions ==
- "Arg kosilane" (Text: Friedrich Reinhold Kreutzwald)
- "Kaste ja pisarad" (Carl Robert Jakobson)
- "Meil aiaäärne tänavas" (Lydia Koidula)
- "Miks sa nutad, lilleke?" (Lydia Koidula)
- "Mu mõttes on üks ainuke" (traditional)
- "Põua aastal 1868" (Carl Robert Jakobson)
- "Süda tuksub" (traditional)
- "Ema ja laps" (Carl Robert Jakobson)
- "Mu isamaa on minu arm" (Lydia Koidula)
- "Mu isamaa, nad olid matnud" (Lydia Koidula)
- "Sind surmani" (Lydia Koidula)
- "Veel pole kadunud kõik" (Carl Robert Jakobson)
- "Õitse ja haljenda, eestlaste maa" (Lydia Koidula)
- "Süda tuksub" (traditional)
- "Mu mõttes on üksainuke" (traditional)
