= National symbols of Estonia =

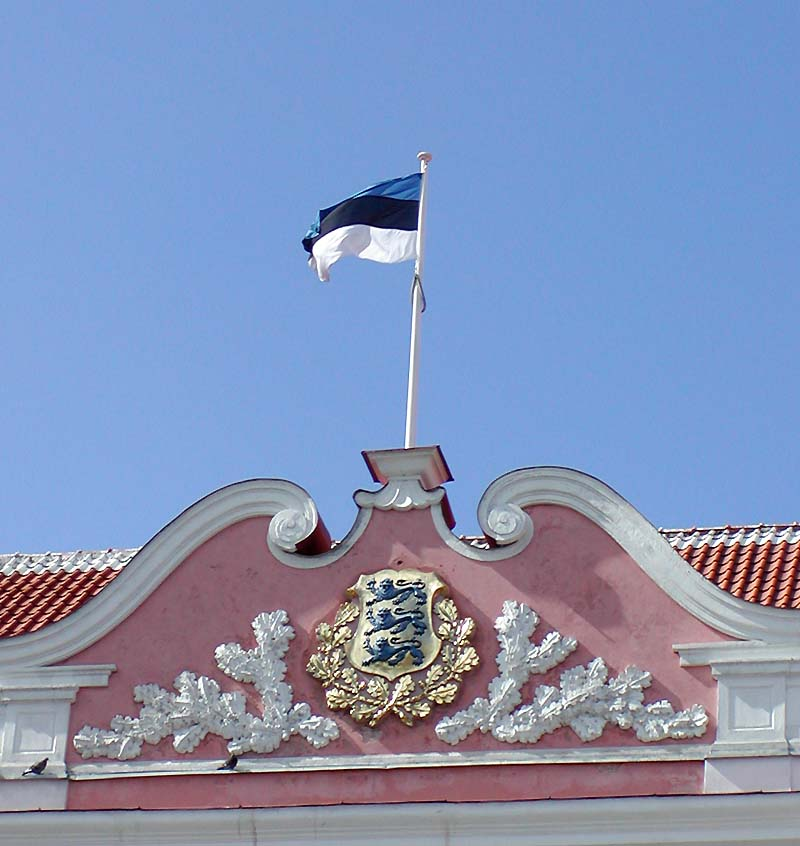
Flag and coat of arms of Estonia at the entrance of Toompea Castle in Tallinn

The national symbols of Estonia are flags, coat of arms, icons or cultural expressions that are emblematic, representative or otherwise characteristic of Estonia or Estonian culture.

== Estonian flag ==
The Estonian flag represents the Republic of Estonia. It is featuring three equal horizontal bands of blue, black, and white, and use the aspect ratio of 7:11.

=== History of the flag ===
The blue-black-white flag was first consecrated at Otepää on 4 June 1884, as the flag of the Estonian University Student Association. During the following years the blue-black-white flag became a national symbol.
The flag was already used as state flag on 24 February, when Estonia declared independence. The Provisional Government of Estonia adopted a resolution on 21 November 1918, proclaiming the blue-black-white flag the state flag. The Law on State Flag was adopted by the Parliament (Riigikogu) on 27 June 1922. During the Soviet occupation of Estonia in 1940–1941 and in 1944–1988 this flag was banned.
The colors of the flag are said to symbolize:

- Blue: the color of faith, loyalty and devotion, the blue sky, sea and lakes of Estonia
- Black: tragic past of Estonian nation, the traditionally black jacket of the Estonian peasant during past times
- White: the striving towards enlightenment and virtue. White is also the color of birch bark and snow, and summer nights illuminated by the midnight sun

The invasion by the Soviet Union in June 1940 led to the flag's ban. It was taken down from the most symbolic location, the tower of Pikk Hermann in Tallinn, on 21 June 1940, when Estonia was still formally independent. On the next day, 22 June 1940, it was hoisted along with the red flag. The tricolor disappeared completely from the tower on 27 July 1940, and was replaced by the Soviet red flag.

The Estonian flag was restored along with independence. The flag atop Pikk Hermann Tower on Toompea hill in Tallinn is raised every morning at dawn, but not before seven o'clock; it is lowered at sunset, but not later than ten o'clock. The flags on other buildings are scheduled by local government codes.

The first blue-black-white tricolor is preserved in the Estonian National Museum.

=== Estonian Flag Act ===
Starting on 1 January 2006, the use of the Estonian flag is regulated by the Estonian Flag Act, which was passed on 23 March 2005 and the good practices that have been historically developed.
Everyone has the right to display and use the Estonian flag as long as it is in accordance with the act and follows honored traditions. The Estonian flag is displayed on buildings and stationary flag staffs on Independence Day, Victory Day and the Restoration of Independence Day.
The Estonian Flag is hoisted at sunrise, no later than 8:00 and is lowered at sunset, no later than 22:00.

== Estonian coat of arms ==
The current coat of arms of Estonia is a golden shield which includes three slim, blue leopards (or lions passant guardant) in the middle, with oak branches along the side of the shield.

The heraldic lions of the coat of arms are the most ancient of Estonia's symbols. They have been used since the 13th century, when they served as the big coat of arms for the capital city, Tallinn. Tallinn got these slim blue lions from the King of Denmark, Waldemar the Second; Denmark was the ruling power in Northern Estonia at that time. Tallinn was under Danish rule between 1219 and 1346, and, according to one theory, the name "Tallinn" itself meant originally "Danish castle" (Estonian: Taanilinn); the etymology, however, is by no means certain. Various other foreign powers came and went, but the three lions remained to become the coat of arms for most of the Estonian territory. The State Assembly of the independent Republic of Estonia adopted the three lions officially by its resolution on June 19, 1925.

This coat of arms of the Republic of Estonia was in use until the beginning of the Soviet occupation in June 1940. The rendering on the coat of arms returned to the public in 1988. For the first time since a hiatus that lasted decades, the coat of arms adorned by three lions of the city of Tallinn was used as a historical element in the Old Town Days of 1988. The City Arms of Tallinn was reinstated in the same year.

=== Symbology ===
Upon the passing of the Law, proposals were made in the Riigikogu on possible interpretations of the images on the coat of arms. A consensus was reached on the suggestions offered by Leopold Raudkepp:

- One of the lions symbolizes the courage of the fight for freedom in ancient times. The second stands for the courage in the uprisings in Harjumaa in 1343. The third represents the courage of the Estonian fight for freedom between 1918 and 1920.
- The wreath of oak leaves stands for the perseverance and strength of Estonia and the evergreen traditions of freedom.

== The national anthem of Estonia ==
The Estonian national anthem "My Native Land..." is a choral-like melody arranged by Fredrik Pacius, a Finnish composer of German origin, in 1843. In Estonia, Johann Voldemar Jannsen's lyrics were set to this melody and sung at the first Estonian Song Festival in 1869. It gained popularity during the growing national movement. In Finland, the tune first became popular only as a students' song, but soon it also became more widely accepted. When both Estonia and Finland became independent after the First World war in 1917 and 1918, the identical melody with different words was recognized as the national anthem of both nations. Estonia officially adopted it in 1920, after the War of Independence. During the decades of the Soviet occupation of Estonia, the melody was strictly forbidden and people were sent to Siberia for singing it. However, even during the worst years the familiar tune could be heard over Finnish radio; it was played every day at the beginning and end of the program. Thus, the melody could never be forgotten. With the restoration of Estonian independence, the national anthem has, of course, been restored too.

During the years of prohibition of national symbols, Lydia Koidula’s poem, "My Native Land is dear to me", with a melody by Gustav Ernesaks became a powerful means of expressing national feelings. This was and still is regarded as an unofficial anthem.

== Other national symbols ==
In addition to the three main state symbols, Estonia has chosen his own national flower and national bird. Estonia even has his own national stone and national fish, which seem to be a rarity among other national symbols. All four have gained official status.

=== National flower ===
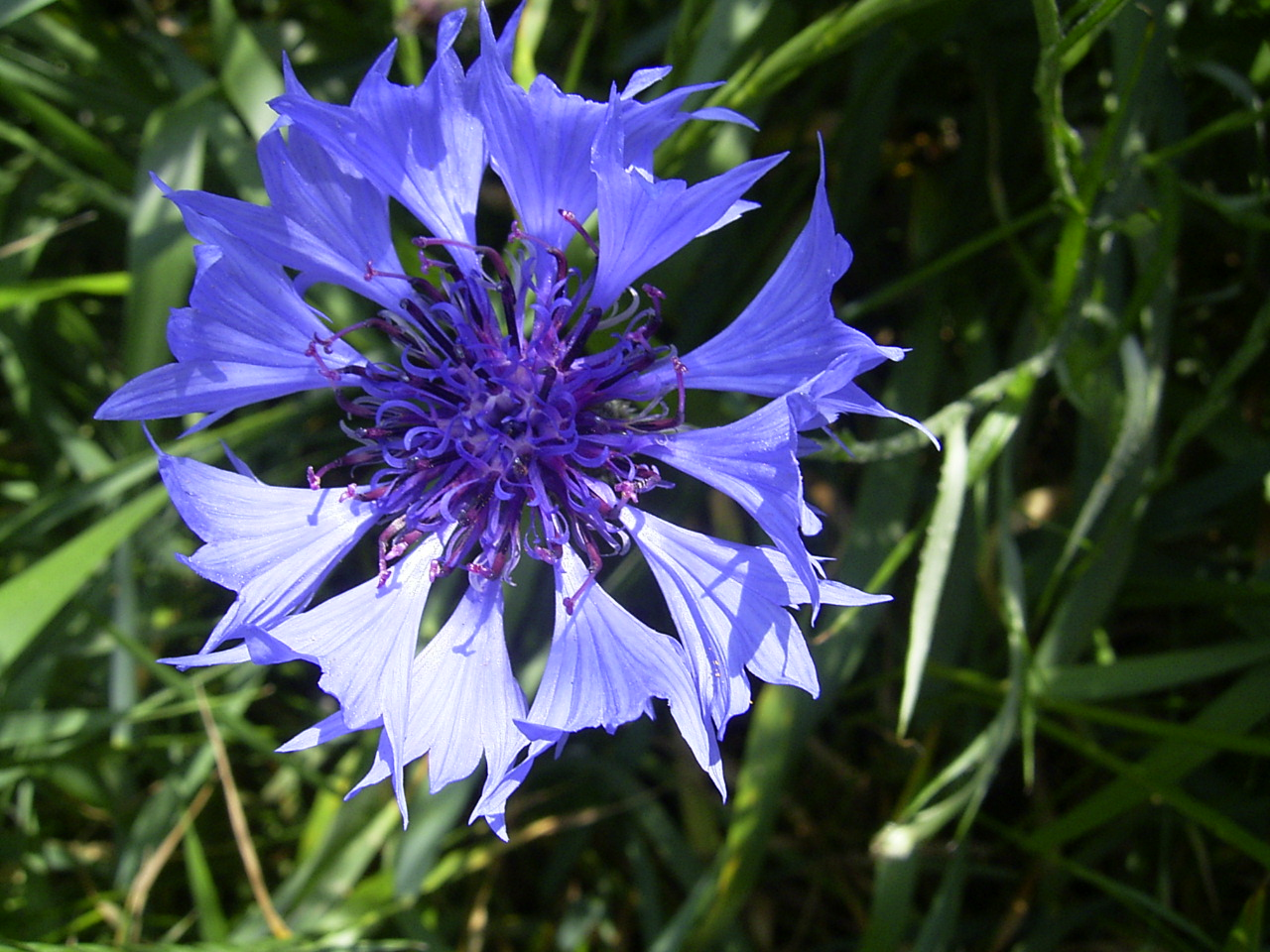
Blue cornflower

The campaign to choose a national flower was organized by The Estonian Wildlife Protection Society. The televised contest was carried out in 1967-68. The ornamental blue cornflower (Estonian: Rukkilill) was the favourite. In choosing it, several considerations were taken into account: general popularity, decorative appearance, easy applicability as an artistic motif, and domestic origin.

The cornflower has grown on Estonian soil for more than 10,000 years, from the time when the first humans came to Northern Europe. The plant grows commonly in rye fields, creating a strong connection in the minds of Estonians between the flower and their daily bread. The blossoms of the cornflower have a particularly striking graphic appearance which has led to its use by artists for decorative purposes. The cornflower is also part of the young girls' festive garland. It is possible that the cornflower was chosen as the national flower in 1968 for another important reason. People knew that the blue of the then forbidden Estonian flag was defined as "cornflower blue". This made the cornflower a symbol of resistance in its own way. The Soviet authorities responded by banning representations of the cornflower. Thus, at the 100th anniversary of the Estonian Song Festival (1969), all the cornflowers used as decorations were painted over with red and presented as "carnations".

=== National bird ===
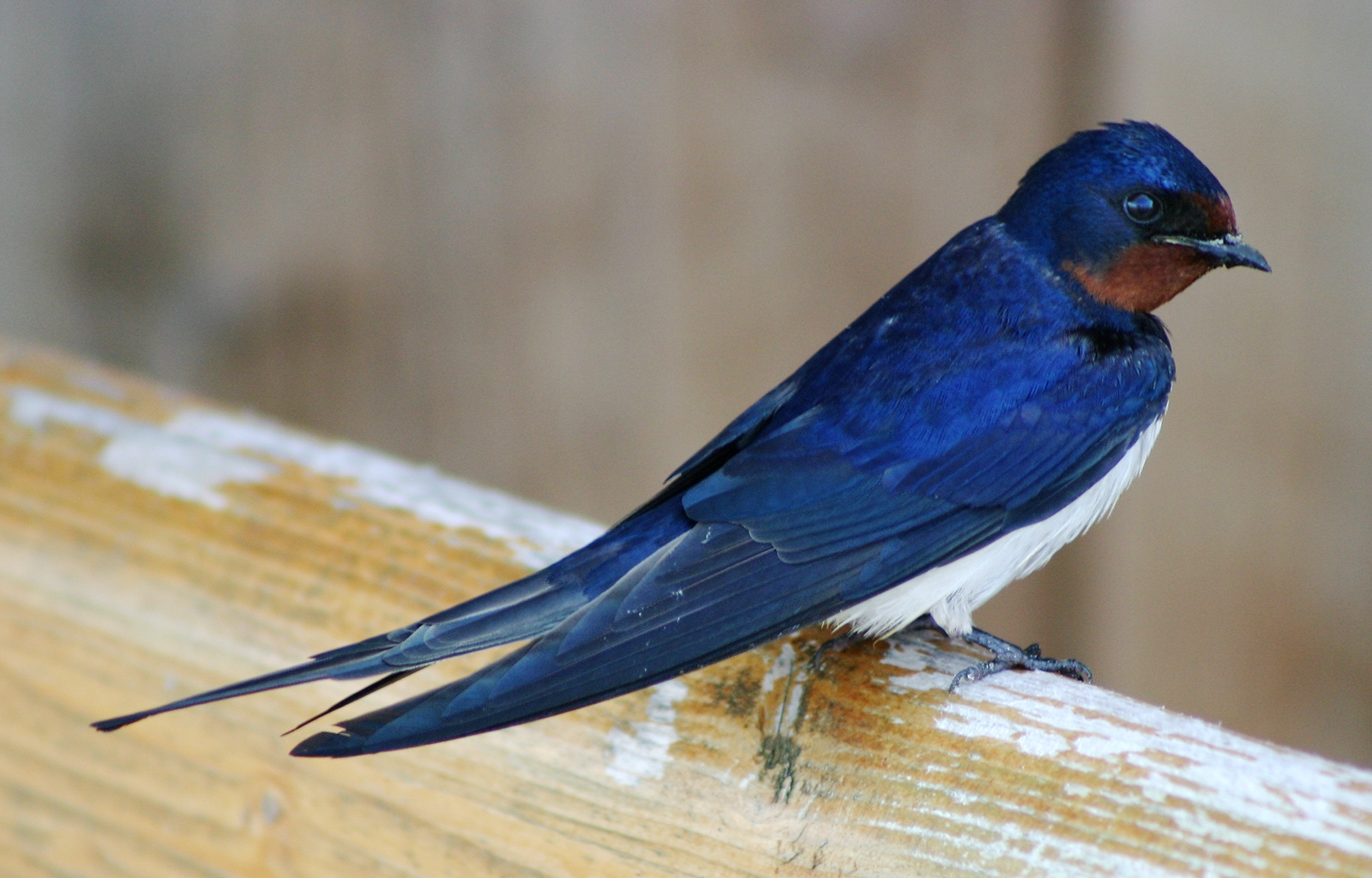
The barn swallow (Hirundo rustica ristica) is the national bird of Estonia.

The barn swallow (Estonian: Suitsupääsuke), the national bird, is a characteristic guest of Estonian homes. Its call can be heard from practically every eave or barn rafter in the country. If the bird finds a suitable opening, under the ridge of a roof or a broken window, it will build its cup-shaped nest; it will even build it inside a house. The choice of the barn swallow as a national bird was mainly the result of a campaign conducted by ornithologists at the beginning of the 1960s.

=== National stone ===
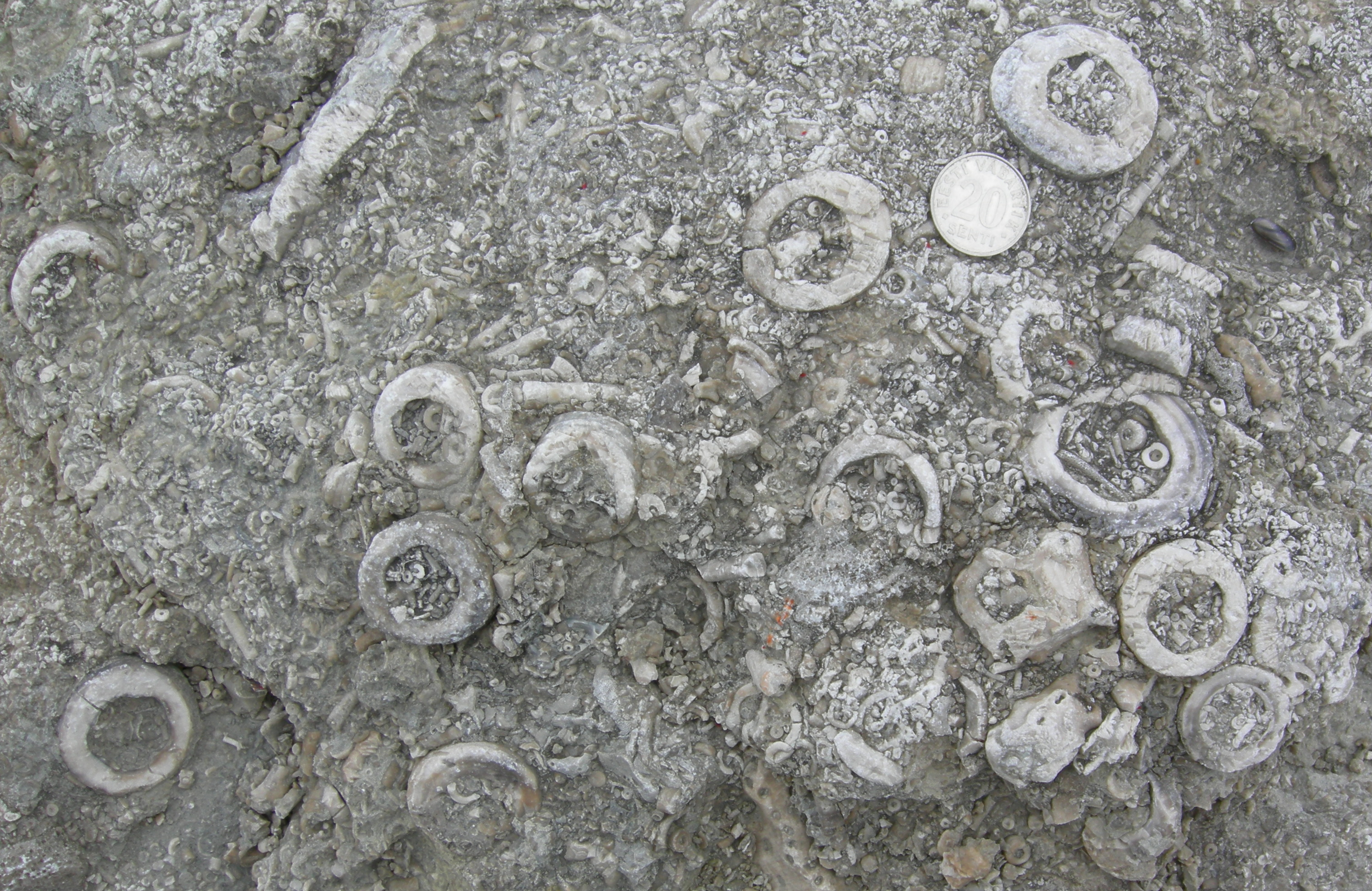
Crinoid-rich bedding plane in a Silurian (Pridoli) limestone (Saaremaa, Estonia)

Estonian national stone is grey limestone (Estonian: paekivi). Estonia lies on a thick layer of limestone which is visible on the steep banks of northern and western Estonia. Most castles, churches, farm buildings, and countless stone fences are made of limestone. Research on limestone and its well-preserved fossils has for centuries brought Estonian scientists international renown. Perhaps that is one of the reasons why numerous scientists supported the declaration of limestone as the national stone of Estonia.

=== National fish ===
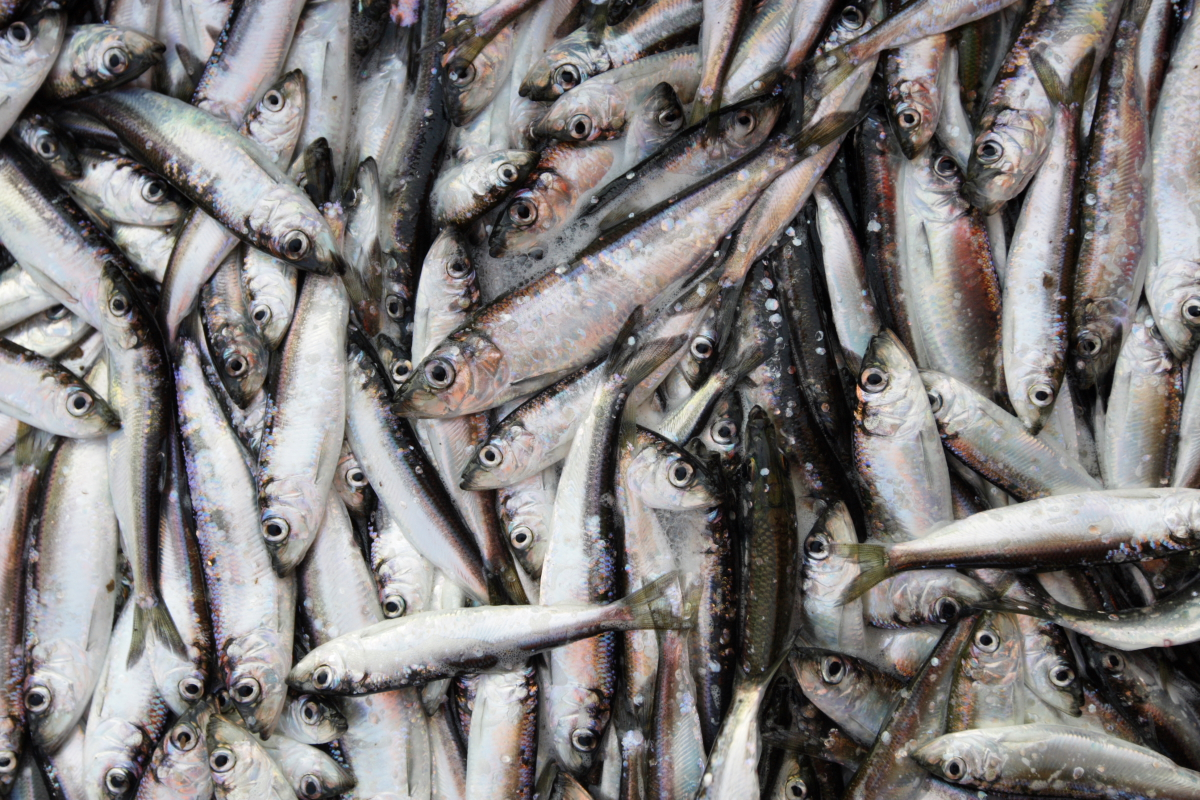
Baltic herring

Estonian national fish is Baltic Herring (Estonian: läänemere heeringas). In the online poll to select a national fish, which attracted 50,000 voters, the pike (Estonian: haug) won by about 500 votes. The group behind the idea was the Estonian National Fishery Association. A panel of judges overruled the vote on the grounds that as a traditional staple of the Estonian diet, the Baltic herring has been more important for more people through the country's history. Baltic herring has been near Estonian coast for 5,000 years.

=== National butterfly ===
In late 2017, the Old World swallowtail (Papilio machaon) was among several species of butterflies selected by the Estonian Society of Lepidopterists as contenders for the National Butterfly of Estonia. Nearly 5,000 members of the public voted online, with P. machaon receiving 2,664 votes, overwhelmingly winning the title. As well as becoming the National Butterfly of Estonia, P. machaon was named as the Butterfly of the Year for 2018; an honorary title given to a native butterfly species in Estonia annually.

=== National animal ===
In 2018, the wolf (Estonian: hunt) was elected Estonian national animal (see et:Eesti rahvusloom).

== Unofficial symbols ==
As in any other country, there are a number of other objects in Estonia which have symbolic value without any official decree. Oak, for example, has long been regarded as a sacred tree. Various buildings and their details are regarded as of significant symbolic value. Among them are the Toompea Castle in Tallinn, together with its mighty watchtower Pikk Hermann, and the Old Thomas weathervane on the spire of Tallinn's Town Hall.

The symbol of Estonian fight for freedom is the core of the Cross of Liberty. It is widely associated with the Estonian War of Independence, World War II and the Estonian Defence League.
