= Ado Grenzstein =

Estonian journalist, writer and teacher

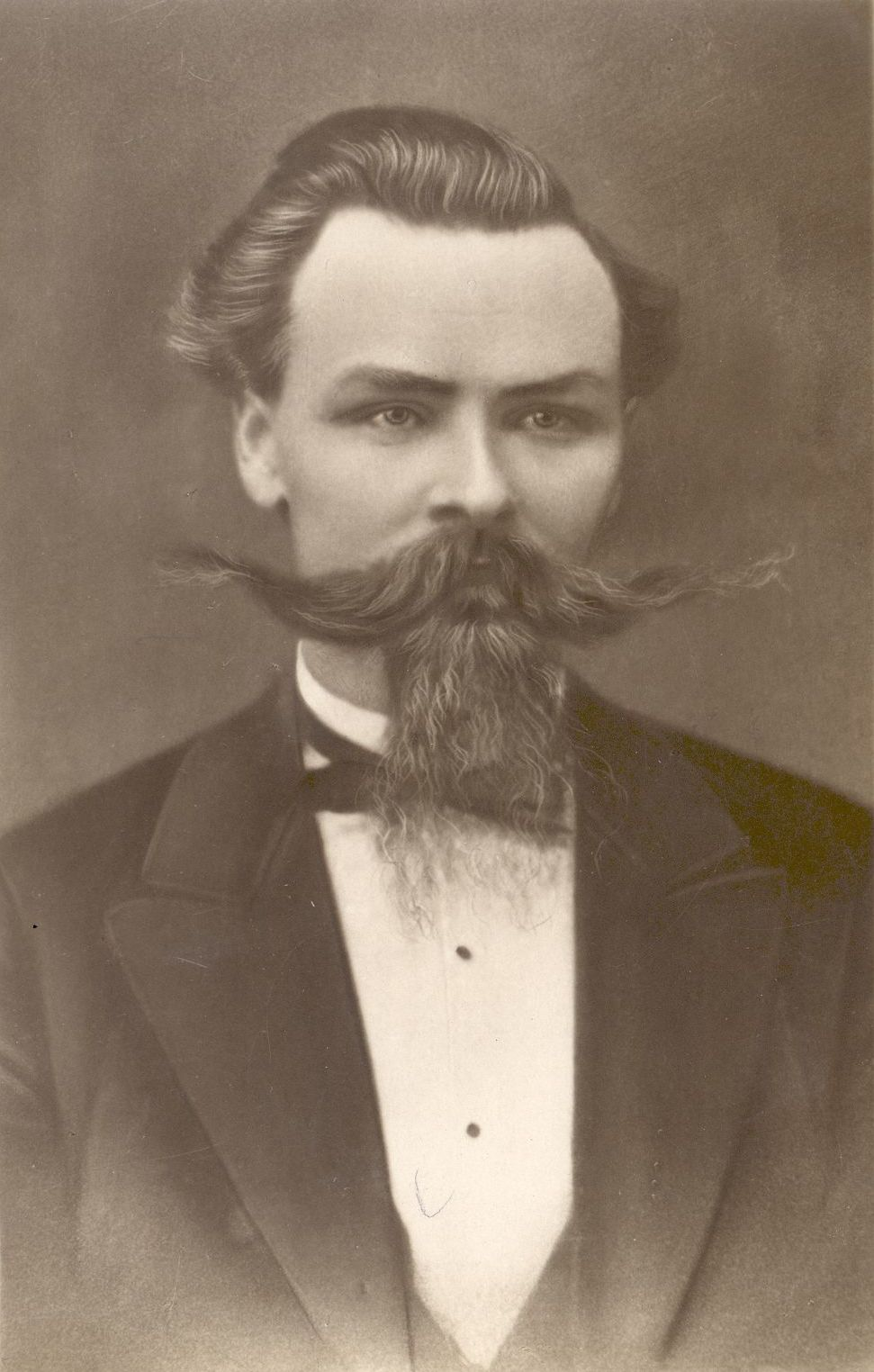
- Born: February 5, 1849; Vooru, Kreis Fellin, Estonia
- Died: April 20, 1916 (aged 67); Menton, France
- Occupations: Journalist, writer, and teacher
- Relatives: Tõnis Grenzstein

Ado Grenzstein, pseudonym A. Piirikivi (5 February 1849 – 20 April 1916) was an Estonian journalist, writer, and teacher.

In 1881, Grenzstein founded the Olevik weekly which became one of the most popular Estonian-language newspapers in what is now Estonia (then part of the Russian Empire) by the end of the 19th century. In his words, the purpose of the newspaper (Olevik) was to "wean the readership, mostly Estonian farmers, away from the 'firebrands and madcaps' who edited Sakala" (a major competing Estonian newspaper at the time).

Grenzstein soon broke with the Estonian nationalist movement and became first an apologist, then a proponent, of the newly launched Russification campaign by Alexander III of Russia (the reigning Emperor from 1881 until his death in 1894). Later on, the views expressed by Grenzstein in his publications became openly anti-Estonian — in his opinion the Estonian people were destined to rapid assimilation and the inevitable disappearance of the Estonian nation probably "would be of no consequence to mankind". His views have been characterized as "national nihilism".

In 1901, Grenzstein left Estonia, moving first to Dresden, Germany. He later settled in, and spent the last years of life in Paris, France.

As a newspaper editor Ado Grenzstein coined some new Estonian-language words out of nothing (see ex nihilo lexical enrichment). For example, he introduced neologisms such as kabe 'draughts, checkers' and male 'chess', which are by now part of standard Estonian vocabulary.

His brother was the Estonian painter Tõnis Grenzstein.
