= Vändra =

Borough in Estonia

- Borough
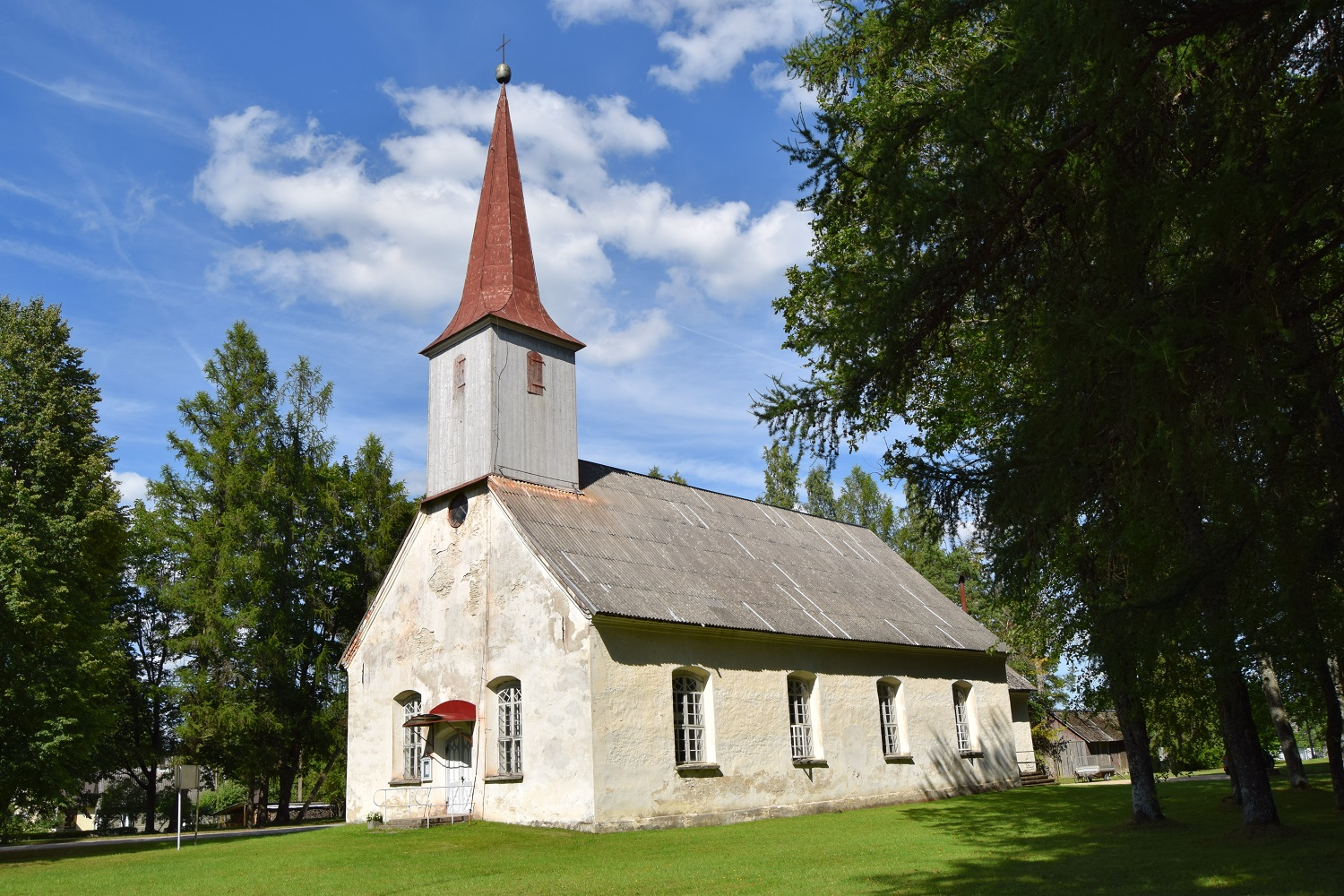
- Vändra church

- Location in Estonia
- Coordinates: 58°39′15″N 25°2′13″E
- Country: Estonia
- County: Pärnu County
- Municipality: Põhja-Pärnumaa Parish

Area
  - Total: 3.28 km^{2} (1.27 sq mi)

Population (2016)
  - Total: 2,191
  - Density: 668/km^{2} (1,730/sq mi)

Vändra (German: Fennern) is a borough (Estonian: alev) in Põhja-Pärnumaa Parish in Pärnu County, Estonia.

== Sights ==
On Old Church Hill there is an underground cemetery called Kabelias, which was used from the 15th to the 18th century, which today is under heritage protection.

Vändra church, dedicated to St. Martin, belongs to the EELK Vändra Martin parish. The church built in 1841 is single-aisled.

A memorial stone has been erected over the former wooden church and manor. The Vana-Vändra manor house is a ruin, the town's stage stands in the park.

The Uue-Vändra manor house, which was located on the banks of the Käru river, was burned down during the 1905 revolution and was destroyed in the Second World War. The former location of the manor is surrounded by the old and species-rich Rõusa Park, which also houses the central building of the Vändra Forestry.

In front of the school building is a statue of the Vändra bear, which was donated to the school by the alumni association of the Vändra Gümnaasium (Vändra Gymnasium).

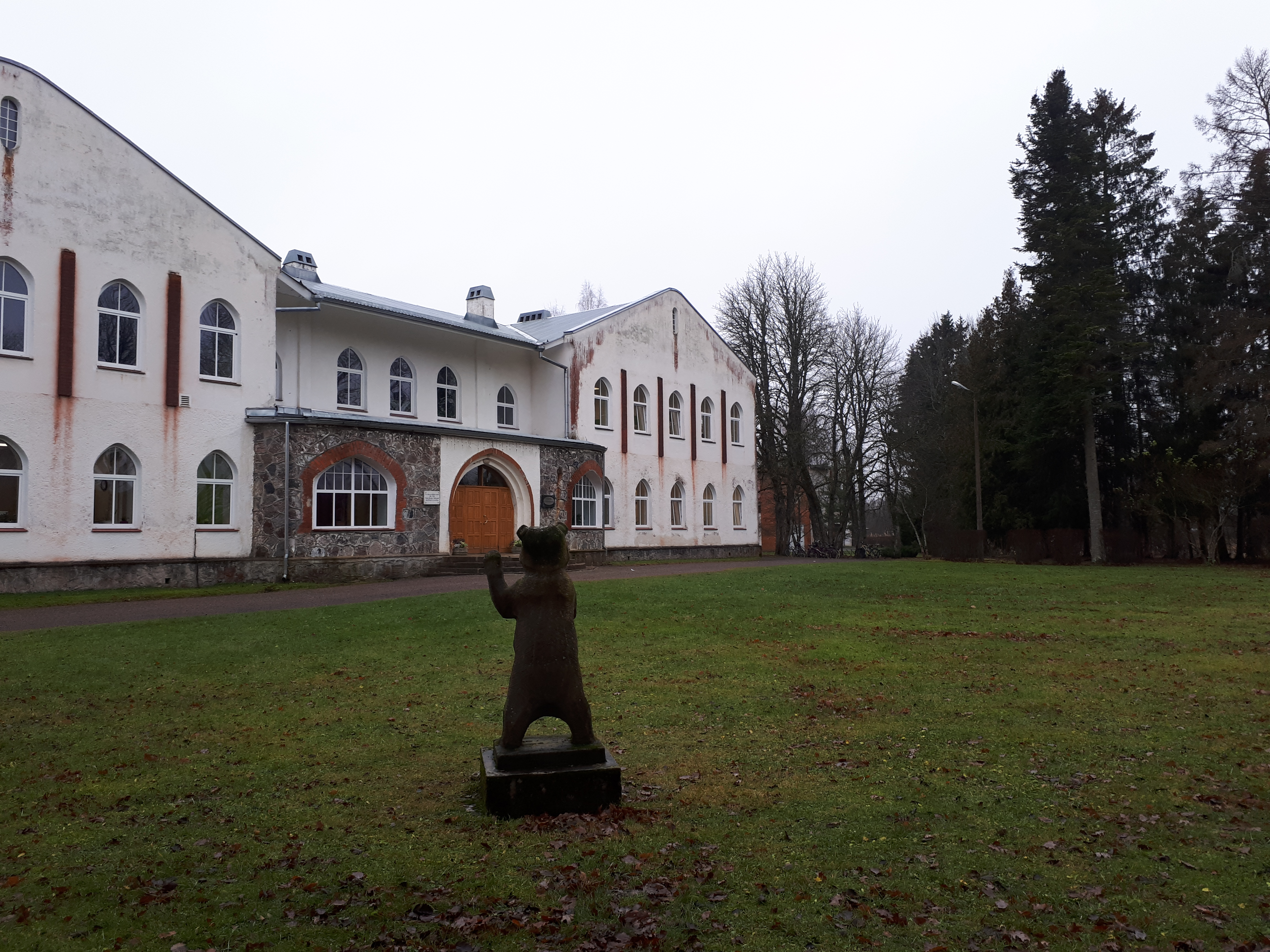
Vändra Gymnasium

The school garden was built in 1924. It has fruit trees, rock garden, sample beds of summer and perennial flowers and a heated greenhouse. In 2004, a fountain was built in the school garden for its 80th anniversary.

Composer Mihkel Lüdig, who spent the last years of his life in Vändra and was buried in the Vändra cemetery, is commemorated by a memorial plaque standing on the wall of the house opposite the buildings of the former school for the deaf.

== History ==
Vändra was first mentioned as a village in 1515 in Wenderskull. Vändra Manor was built in the second half of the 16th century. In 1884, the Ditmars, local landowners, divided the manor into Vana-Vändra Manor and Uue-Vändra Manor.

Southeast of Vändra, Suurejõe, there was a small industrial center by the Pärnu River, where there was a water-powered mill and earlier a copper factory. At the beginning of the 19th century, the Vändra glass factory was established in the current Võidula Manor, which ended its work only in the days of the Republic of Estonia. Vändra became the economic and cultural center of Pärnumaa. The railway reached Vändra in 1928. With nearly 1,000 inhabitants, it was one of the largest church settlements in Estonia.

On September 13, 1945, Vändra received the status of a borough. From 1950 to 1962, Vändra was the center of the surrounding district. Vändra received the status of a municipality in 1993.

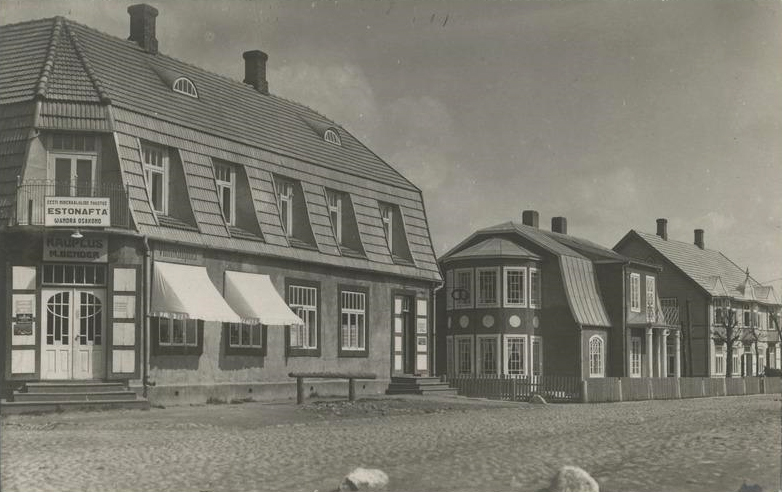
Vändra at the beginning of the 20th century

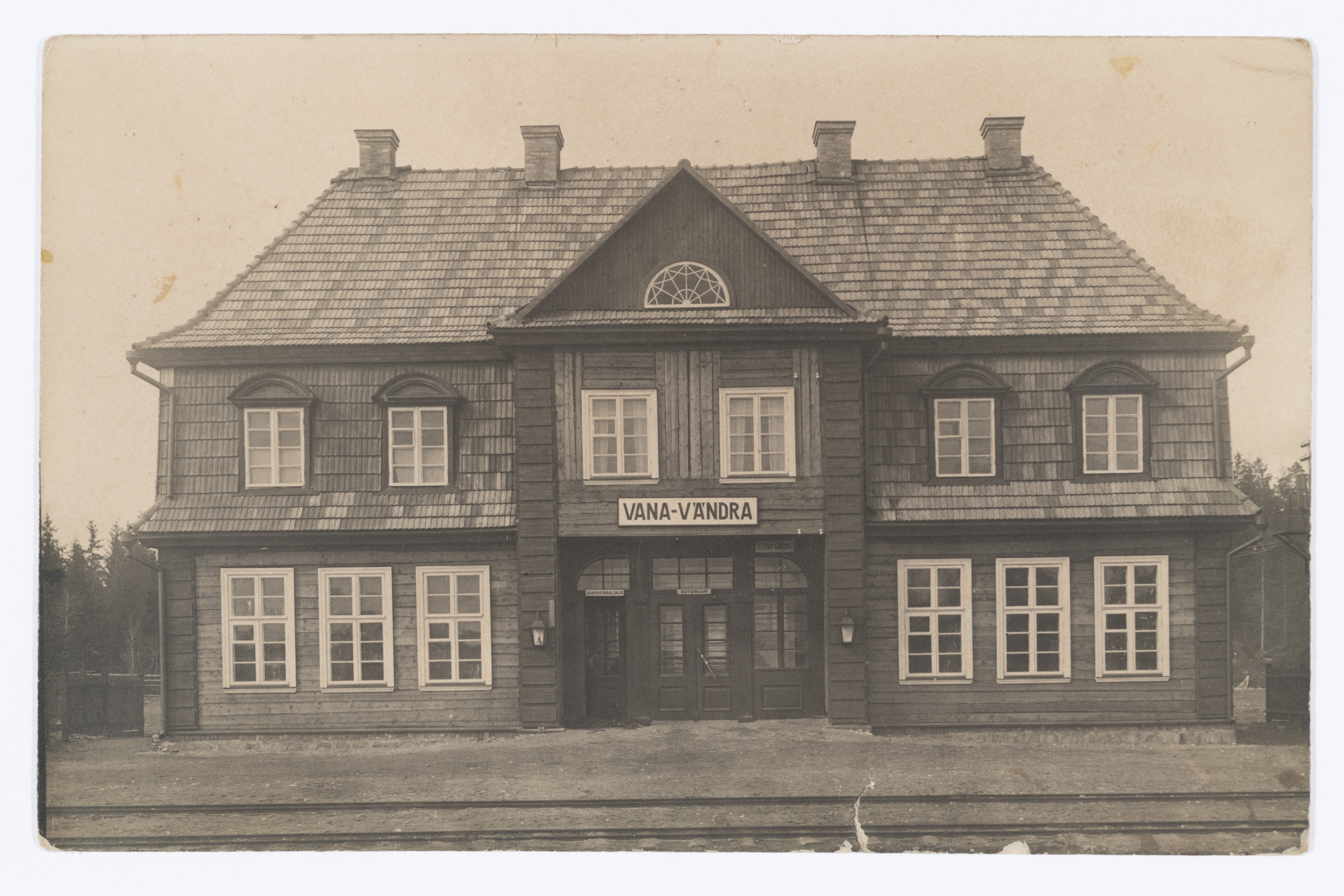
Vändra railway station in 1930s

== Notable people ==
- Johann Voldemar Jannsen (1819–1890), journalist and poet, an early figure of the Estonian national awakening
- Karl von Ditmar (1822–1892), Baltic German geologist and explorer, went to Kamchatka
- Lydia Koidula (1843–1886), poet, became Estonia's national poet
- Mihkel Lüdig (1880–1958), composer, organist and choir conductor.
- Anton Õunapuu (1887–1919), teacher, soldier and founder of the local Boy Scouts movement
- Ain-Ervin Mere (1905–1969), military officer implicated in the Holocaust trials in Soviet Estonia
- Artur Lind (1927–1989), biologist, founded molecular biology in Estonia.
- Alar Laneman (born 1962), politician, Ministry of the Interior, 2020 to 2021
- Agnes Oaks (born 1970), ballet dancer, principal dancer with English National Ballet, from 1990
- Andres Metsoja (born 1978), politician, Pärnu County Governor, 2010 to 2015

=== Sport ===
- Ants Vaino (1940–1971), racing driver
- Tarvo Seeman (born 1969), chess player, twice won the Estonian Chess Championship
- Tanel Kangert (born 1987), professional cyclist from 2008 to 2022.
