= Olevik =

Weekly newspaper in Estonia (1882–1915)

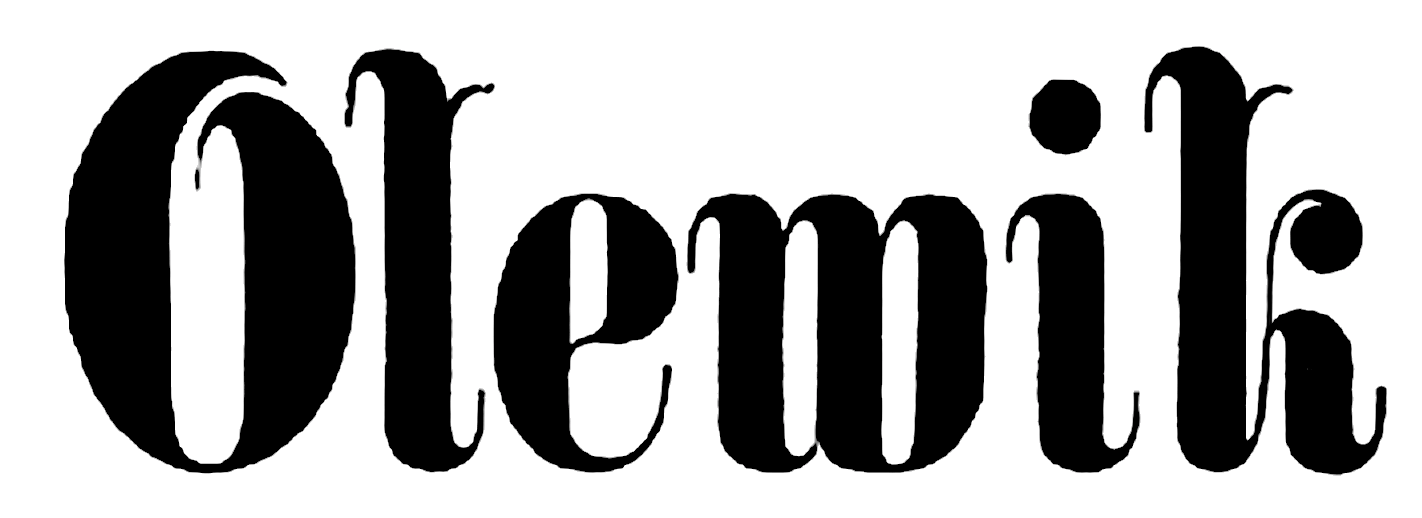
- Type: Weekly newspaper
- Owner: Ado Grenzstein
- Founder: Ado Grenzstein
- Editor-in-chief: Ado Grenzstein
- Founded: 1882
- Ceased publication: 1915
- Language: Estonian
- Headquarters: Tartu
- Country: Estonia

Olevik (Estonian: Present Time) was a weekly newspaper published in Tartu, Estonia. The paper existed between 1882 and 1915.

== History and profile ==
Olevik was established in 1882. The paper was owned and edited by Ado Grenzstein. It was published weekly in Tartu. The paper had links with the politically moderate wing of the national awakening movement and opposed the more radical wing of Sakala.

During its heyday, Olevik was the best edited Estonian newspaper and had more variety and more substance than other Estonian newspapers at that time, raising topics that were hitherto untreated in Estonian media. The paper was widely supported by the educated Estonian elite. It later supported Russification, though, and opposed Jaan Tõnisson's Postimees. Its publisher Grenzstein has been characterized because of his later position as "the most remarkable representative of Estonian national nihilism".

The words kirjastaja and kirjastamine (Estonian for publisher and publishing, respectively) were first used in the Estonian language by Ado Grenzstein in Olevik. The paper had a supplement, Virmaline (Estonian: Northern Light).

Juhan Liiv occasionally contributed to Olevik. Jüri Tilk also contributed to the weekly and later, became its second editor. Following the 1905 Russian revolution, the paper featured numerous articles on women's suffrage.
