= Karl von Ditmar =

Baltic German geologist and explorer

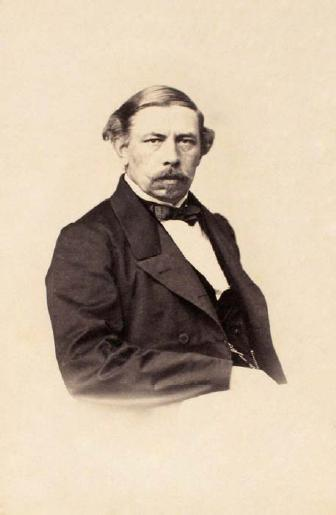
- Born: 8 September 1822; Vändra, Pärnu County, Livonia
- Died: 25 April 1892 (aged 69); Tartu, Livonia
- Occupations: Geologist; Explorer

Karl Bernhard Woldemar Ferdinand von Ditmar (sometimes Carl von Ditmar) (8 September [O.S. 27 August] 1822 in Vändra – 25 April [O.S. 13 April] 1892 in Tartu) was a Baltic German geologist and explorer, who travelled in and contributed to the scientific understanding of Kamchatka.

== Life and work ==
Karl von Ditmar was born in Vändra, present-day Estonia as the son of jurist Woldemar Friedrich Carl Ditmar and Charlotte Ditmar, née Stackelberg. He studied at the University of Tartu in 1841–1847, where he befriended Leopold von Schrenck and Karl Maximovich, as well as Karl Ernst von Baer. Ditmar began studying agricultural science but after some time changed to mineralogy and geology under Otto Wilhelm Hermann von Abich and Hermann Martin Asmuss. After having graduated university with a master's degree, Ditmar in 1846–1848 travelled Europe and among other things attended lectures at the Freiberg Mining Academy in present-day Germany. In 1848 he returned to Russia and Saint Petersburg, and through his friendship with Leopold von Schrenck was introduced to Alexander von Middendorff at the Imperial Academy of Sciences.

In 1851 Ditmar undertook a voyage to Kamchatka which would last until 1854, and there undertook important scientific investigations. His account of the travels in Kamchatka, published first in 1890, is still used by scientists involved in studies of Kamchatka.

In 1855–1856, Ditmar also made a geographical survey trip in the area of the river Amur. He returned to Livonia in 1856 and settled in his estate at Käru, and in 1858 married Wilhelmina Stackelberg. The couple had four daughters.

== Selected writings ==
- Reisen und Aufenthalt in Kamtschatka in den Jahren 1851-1855.[Travel and stay in Kamchatka in the years 1851-1855]
- Beiträge zur Kenntniss des Russischen Reiches und der angränzenden Länder Asiens. [Contributions to Knowledge of the Russian Empire and Neighboring Countries of Asia]
