= Johann Voldemar Jannsen =

Estonian journalist (1819–1890)

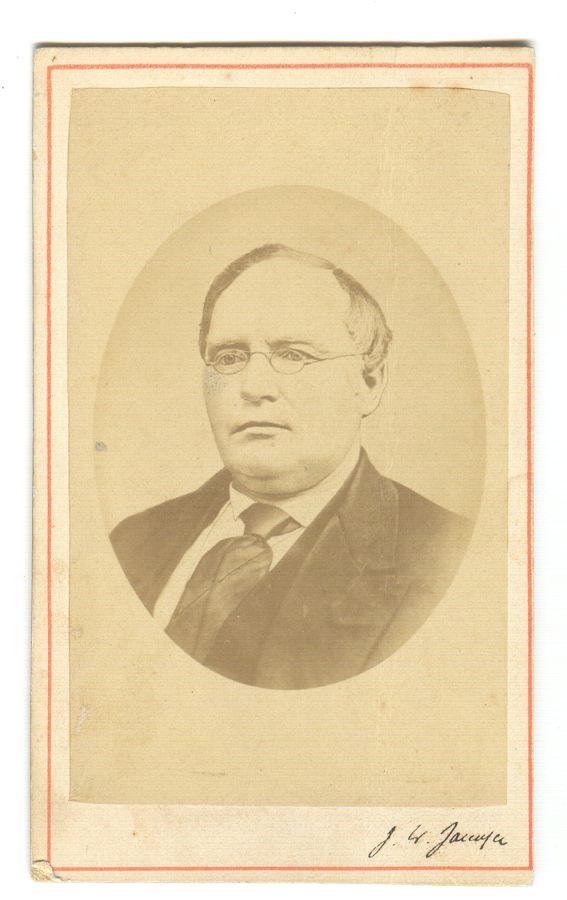
Johann Voldemar Jannsen

Johann Voldemar Jannsen (16 May [O.S. 4 May] 1819 – 13 July [O.S. 1 July] 1890) was an Estonian journalist. He was one of the earliest figures of the Estonian national awakening, which he promoted through his newspaper, the Eesti Postimees, and two Estonian Song Festivals. He wrote the nationalist song "Mu isamaa, mu õnn ja rõõm", which became the national anthem of Estonia after its independence. Jannsen was the father of poet Lydia Koidula.

== Early life ==
Johann Voldemar Jannsen was born in Vana-Vändra on 16 May 1819. His father was a miller who died while Jannsen was seven years old, so Jannsen was forced to herd cattle while attending school. He began working at the church in 1838, first as an organist before working as clerk. He was a member of the Moravian Church. He married in 1843 and became a schoolmaster, moving to Pärnu in 1850 to work at a school in the city.

Jannsen wished to publish an Estonian-language newspaper so the poor could be educated in their native language, but he was initially refused a license despite several attempts to obtain one. Instead, he produced his own works about religion, and he started his own annual publication that ran seven editions from 1848 to 1860. He was eventually granted a license after befriending two Baltic German publishers, Heinrich Laakmann and Friedrich Wilhelm Borm. Both accepted his request to publish his work, and he began working with Borm in 1857. Jannsen began producing the Perno Postimees, making him the first journalist to publish in Estonian. Jannsen wrote in common parlance, allowing him to reach a wider audience. Under the terms of his publisher, he was to write about news and religious topics but to avoid political or social topics.

== The national awakening in Tartu ==
Jannsen moved to Tartu in 1863, leaving his job as a schoolmaster and rebranding the Perno Postimees as the Eesti Postimees. He published supplement papers, including Eesti Põllumees for farmers and Juttu-tuba with gossip stories translated from German magazines. His paper entered a decline after 1864.

In Tartu, Jannsen helped found what became the Estonian national awakening. His home and his office both became meeting places among nationalists such as Carl Robert Jakobson and Jakob Hurt. Jannsen founded the Vanemuine theatre group in 1865 and organised the Estonian Song Festival to promote a national identity in 1869. He also became the head of Tartu's Estonian Choral Society. Jannsen wrote from an Enlightenment perspective, advocating cultural advances and education while criticising feudalism. He published a variety of opinions in his paper, including those of controversial radicals that sparked backlash against him. He wrote the song "Mu isamaa, mu õnn ja rõõm", which was adopted by the nationalists.

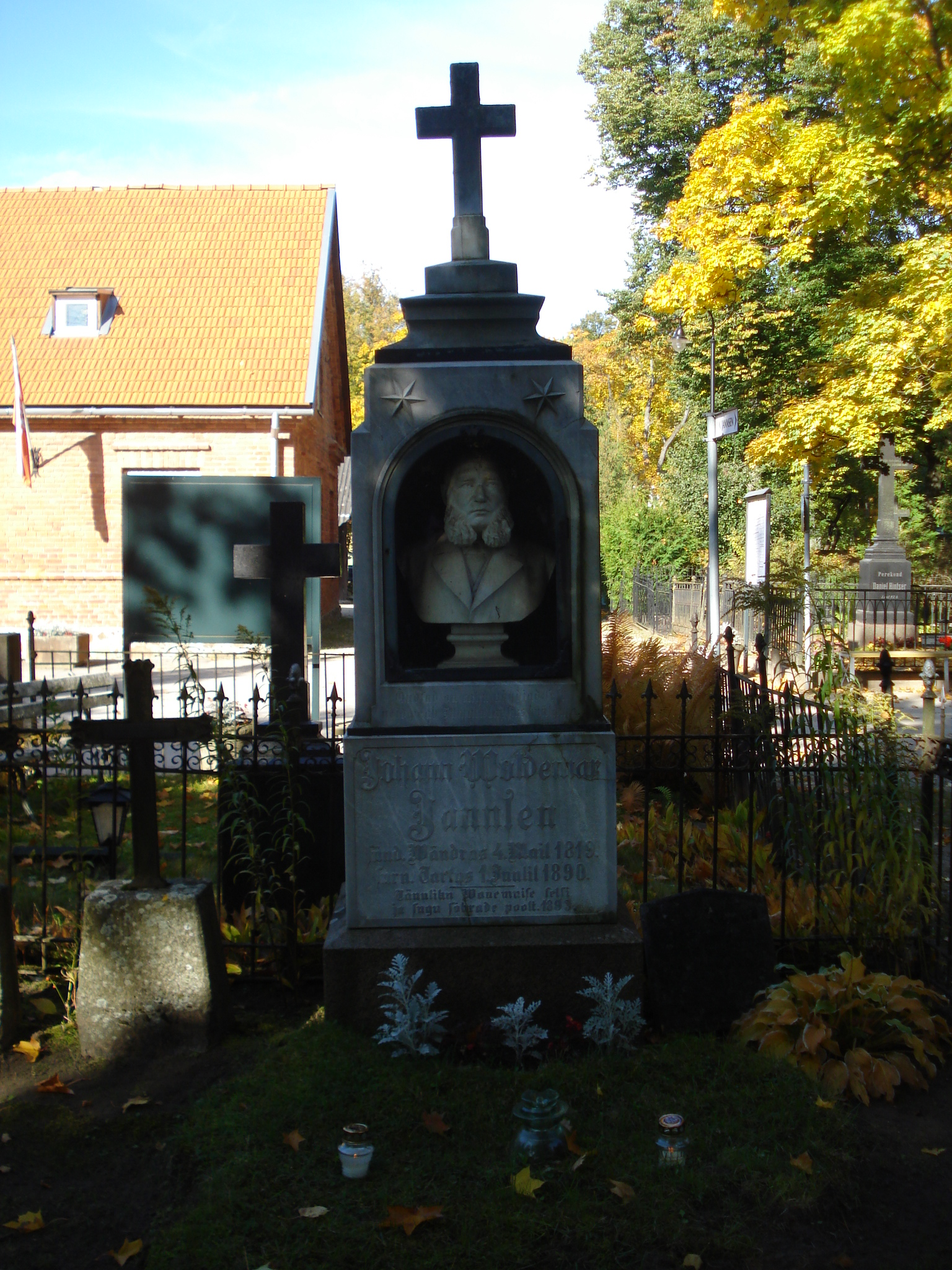
Gravestone in Tartu

Jannsen feared that social conflict between the predominant Baltic German and Russian populations would affect the Estonians, as they might be forced to choose one side and invoke the ire of the other. He remained cordial and cooperated with the Baltic Germans that held control over Estonia, leading to accusations that he was corrupt or that he had betrayed the movement. The nationalist movement rebuked him as he advised caution, and Jakobson founded a more popular nationalist newspaper, Sakala. Jannsen organised a second festival in 1879.

== Death and legacy ==
Jannsen was left disabled following a stroke in 1880, and he retired as editor of the Eesti Postimees that year. He died in Tartu on 13 July 1890. Jannsen's daughter Lydia Koidula became a well-known Estonian poet. Jannsen's patriotic song "Mu isamaa, mu õnn ja rõõm" became the national anthem of Estonia following its independence.
