= Eduard Magnus Jakobson =

Estonian artist and missionary

Masthead logo of Sakala

Eduard Magnus Jakobson (5 February [O.S. 24 January] 1847 in Torma – 2 August [O.S. 21 July] 1903 in Tallinn) was an Estonian wood engraver and Baptist missionary. He illustrated many books and designed the masthead logo for Sakala, a newspaper founded by his older brother, Carl Robert Jakobson.

Originally a Lutheran, Eduard Magnus became a member of the Baptist church in 1869.

== Gallery ==
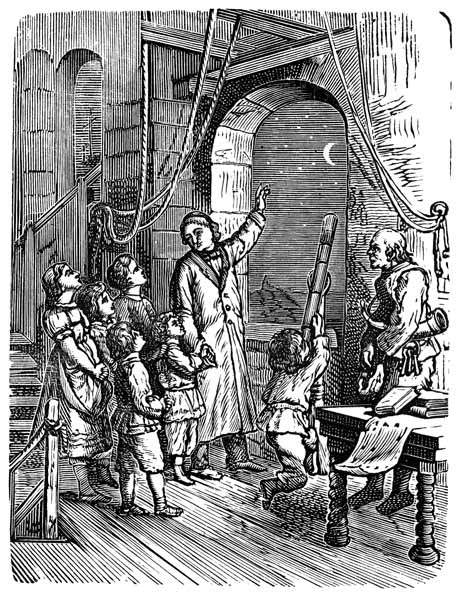

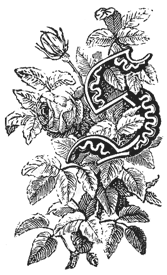

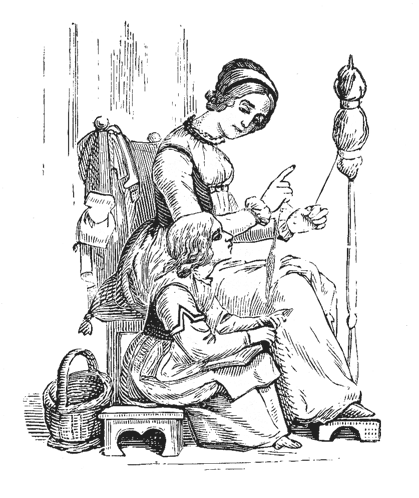

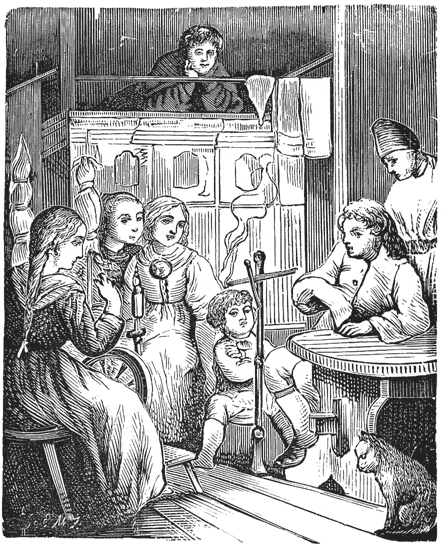
