= Ants Vaino =

Estonian racing driver

Ants Vaino (15 February 1940 – 15 June 1971) was an Estonian racing driver.

He was born in Vändra, Pärnu County.

He began his motorsport career in 1965, coached by Arkadi Nõmmeste. In 1969 and 1970, he won silver medal at Soviet Union championships for Formula 4 class. He was a multiple-time Estonian champion in various racing disciplines.

He died on 15 June 1971 at the Borovaya circuit in Belarus, due to injuries sustained in a racing accident.
