= Artur Lind =

Estonian molecular biologist

- Born: 6 April 1927; Vändra
- Died: 30 November 1989 (aged 62); Tartu
- Education: University of Tartu
- Known for: founder of molecular biology in Estonia discovery of 5S ribosomal RNA
- Scientific career
- Fields: biology

Artur Lind (6 April 1927, Vändra – 30 November 1989, Tartu) was an Estonian biologist and is considered to be the founder of molecular biology in Estonia.

Lind studied to be a surgeon at the University of Tartu. Due to an allergic reaction to analgesics used at the time, he was unable to continue working as a surgeon and moved to the faculty of biochemistry instead.

He is credited with the discovery of 5S ribosomal RNA.

His remains are buried in Vana-Jaani cemetery in Tartu. The Sepapaja 6 office building in Ülemiste City is named after Artur Lind.
