= Friedrich August Saebelmann =

Estonian conductor and composer (1851–1911)

Friedrich August Saebelmann (1890)

Friedrich August Saebelmann (26 September 1851, in Karksi, Viljandi County – 3 March 1911, in Paistu, Viljandi County) was a composer, conductor, organist and teacher from Estonia.

He is buried at Paistu Cemetery.

His brother was composer Aleksander Kunileid.

== Works ==
- choral song "Ellerhein"
- choral song "Su priiuse nad olid matnud"
- choral song "Ema süda"
- choral song "Kaunimad laulud"
- choral song "Jahilaul"
- choral song "Kevade noorus"
- choral song "Palve"
- solo song "Serenaad"
