= Lydia Koidula =

Estonian poet (1843–1886)

Lydia Jannsen (Koidula)
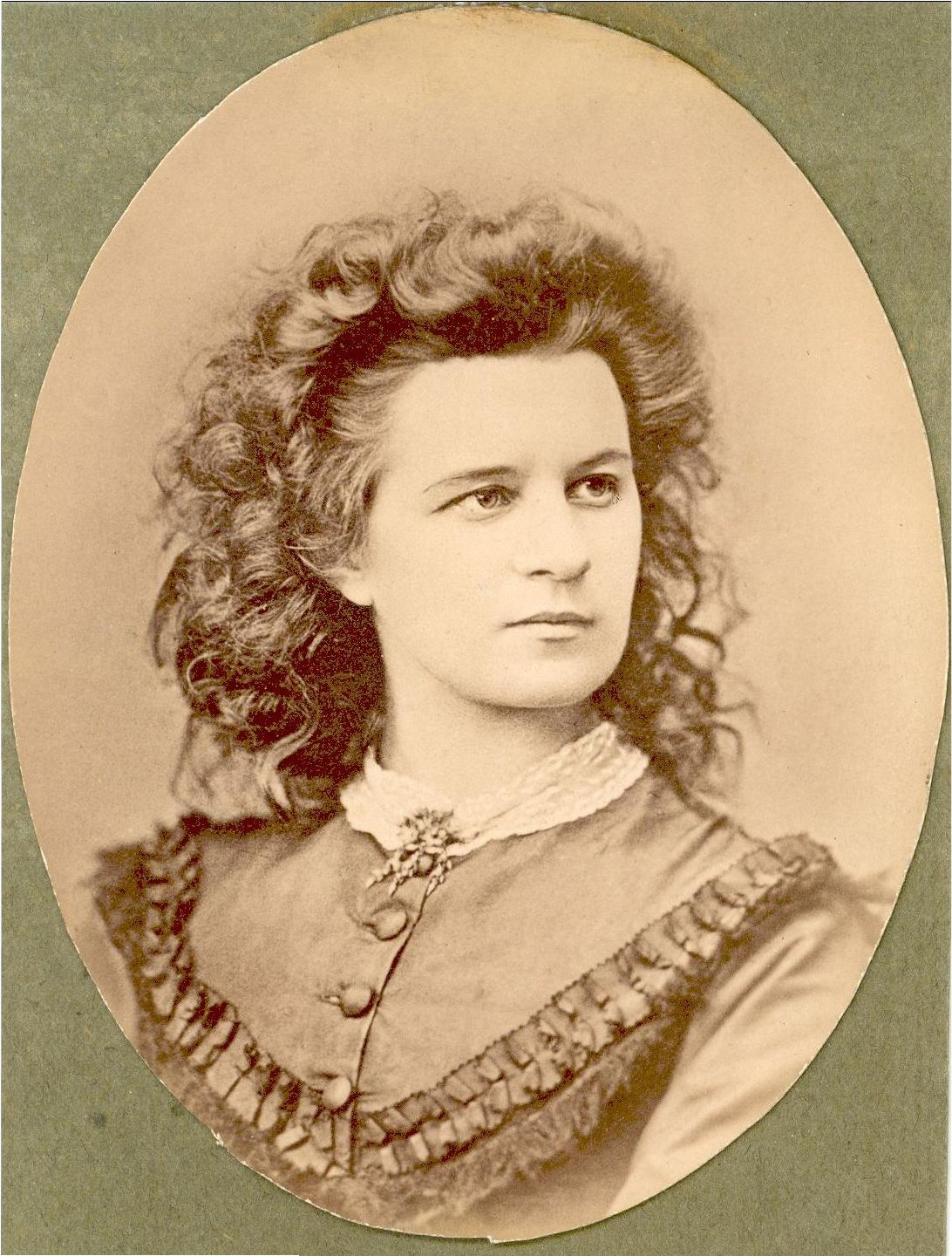
- Born: Lydia Emilie Florentine Jannsen; 24 December 1843; Vändra, Estonia (then Governorate of Livonia, Russian Empire)
- Died: 11 August 1886 (aged 42); Kronstadt, Russian Empire
- Occupations: Playwright; poet
- Spouse: Eduard Michelson (m. 1873)
- Children: 4
- Family: Johann Voldemar Jannsen (father)

Lydia Emilie Florentine Jannsen (24 December [O.S. 12 December] 1843 – 11 August [O.S. 30 July] 1886), known by her pen name and sobriquet Lydia Koidula (Lydia of the Dawn), was an Estonian poet. She is also frequently referred to as Koidulaulik ('Singer of the Dawn').

Over time, she has achieved the status of Estonia's national poet.

== Early life ==
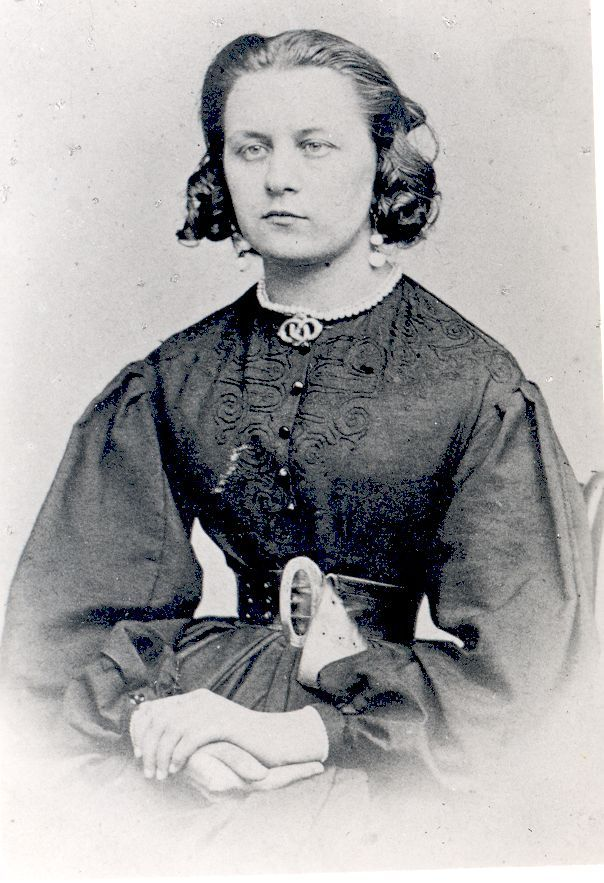
Lydia Jannsen at young age (ca 1860).

Lydia Jannsen was born in Vändra (Fennern), Estonia. The family moved to the nearby county town of Pärnu (Pernau) in 1850, where, in 1857, her father Johann Voldemar Jannsen started the first local Estonian language newspaper and where Lydia attended the German-language grammar school. The Jannsens moved to the university town of Tartu (Dorpat) in 1864. Any kind of expression of nationalism, including publication in indigenous languages, was a sensitive subject in the Russian Empire, however the rule of Czar Alexander II (1855–1881) was relatively liberal and Jannsen managed to persuade the imperial censorship to allow him to publish the first Estonian-language newspaper with nationwide distribution in 1864. Both the Pärnu local and the national newspaper were called Postimees (The Courier).

Lydia wrote for her father on both papers, in addition to publishing her own work. In 1873, she married Eduard Michelson, an army physician, and moved to Kronstadt (Russian naval base on an island near St. Petersburg). From 1876 to 1878 the Michelsons visited Breslau, Strasbourg and Vienna. Koidula lived in Kronstadt for 13 years, and although she spent the summers in Estonia, she reportedly never stopped feeling inconsolably homesick. Lydia Koidula was the mother of three children. She died from breast cancer on 11 August 1886. Her last poem was Enne surma — Eestimaale! (Before death, to Estonia!).

== Works ==
Koidula's poetry and her newspaper work for her father, Johann Voldemar Jannsen (1819–1890), remained anonymous. In Estonia, like elsewhere in Europe, writing was not considered a suitable career for a respectable young lady in the mid-19th century. In spite of this, she was a major literary figure and is considered one of the founders of Estonian theatre.

=== Literary works ===
Koidula's most important work, Emajõe ööbik, (The Nightingale of the Emajõgi River), was published in 1867. Three years earlier, in 1864, Adam Peterson, a farmer, and Johann Köler, a fashionable Estonian portraitist living in Saint Petersburg, had petitioned the emperor for better treatment from the German landowners who ruled the Baltic provinces, equality, and for the language of secondary and higher education to be Estonian instead of German. Immediately afterwards, they were taken to the police, where they were interrogated about a petition that 'included false information and was directed against the state'. Adam Peterson was sentenced to imprisonment for a year.

Two years later, in 1866, the censorship reforms of 1855 that had given Koidula's father a window to start Postimees were reversed. Pre-publication censorship was re-imposed, and literary freedom was curtailed. This was the political and literary climate when Koidula began publishing. Nevertheless, it was also the time of the national awakening, when the Estonian people, freed from serfdom in 1816, began to feel a sense of pride in their nationhood and to aspire to self-determination. Koidula was the most articulate voice of these aspirations.

German influence in Koidula's work was unavoidable. The Baltic Germans had retained hegemony in the region since the 13th century, throughout German, Polish, Swedish and Russian rule, and thus German was the language of tuition and of the intelligentsia in 19th-century Estonia. Like her father (and all other Estonian writers at the time), Koidula translated much sentimental German prose, poetry and drama, and there is a particular influence of the Biedermeier movement. Biedermeier, a style that dominated 'bourgeois' art in continental Europe from 1815 to 1848, developed in the wake of the suppression of revolutionary ideas following Napoleon's defeat. It was plain, unpretentious and characterised by pastoral romanticism; its themes were the home, the family, religion and scenes of rural life. The themes of Koidula's early Vainulilled (Meadow Flowers; 1866) were certainly proto-Biedermeier, but her delicate, melodic treatment of them was in no way rustic or unsophisticated, as demonstrated in the unrestrained patriotic outpourings of Emajõe Ööbik.

She once wrote to a Finnish correspondent: "It is a sin, a great sin, to be little in great times when a person can actually make history". Koidula’s reaction to Estonia’s historical subjugation was personal. By the time of the Estonian National Awakening in the 1860s, Estonia had been ruled by foreign powers for over 600 years.

She was closely allied to Carl Robert Jakobson (1841–1882), and he gave her the pen name Lydia Koidula.. She also knew Friedrich Reinhold Kreutzwald (1803–1882), writer of the Estonian national epic, Kalevipoeg (The Son of Kalev). The Estonian literary tradition started by Kreutzwald continued with Koidula, but whereas The Bard of Viru tried to imitate the regivärss folk traditions of ancient Estonian, Koidula wrote (mostly) in modern, Western European end-rhyming metres that had, by the mid 19th century, become the dominant form. This made Koidula's poetry much more accessible to the popular reader. But the major importance of Koidula lay not so much in her preferred form of verse but in her potent use of the Estonian language. Estonian was, still, in the 1860s, in a German-dominated Baltic province of Imperial Russia, the language of the oppressed indigenous peasantry. It was still the subject of orthographical bickering, still used predominantly for patronising educationalist or religious texts, practical advice to farmers, or cheap and cheerful popular storytelling. Koidula successfully used the vernacular language to express emotions that ranged from an affectionate poem about the family cat, in Meie kass (Our Cat) and delicate love poetry, Head ööd (Good Night), to a powerful cri de coeur and rallying call to an oppressed nation, Mu isamaa nad olid matnud (My Country, They Have Buried You). Lydia Koidula’s work challenged the colonial view that the Estonian language was underdeveloped.

=== Theatre ===
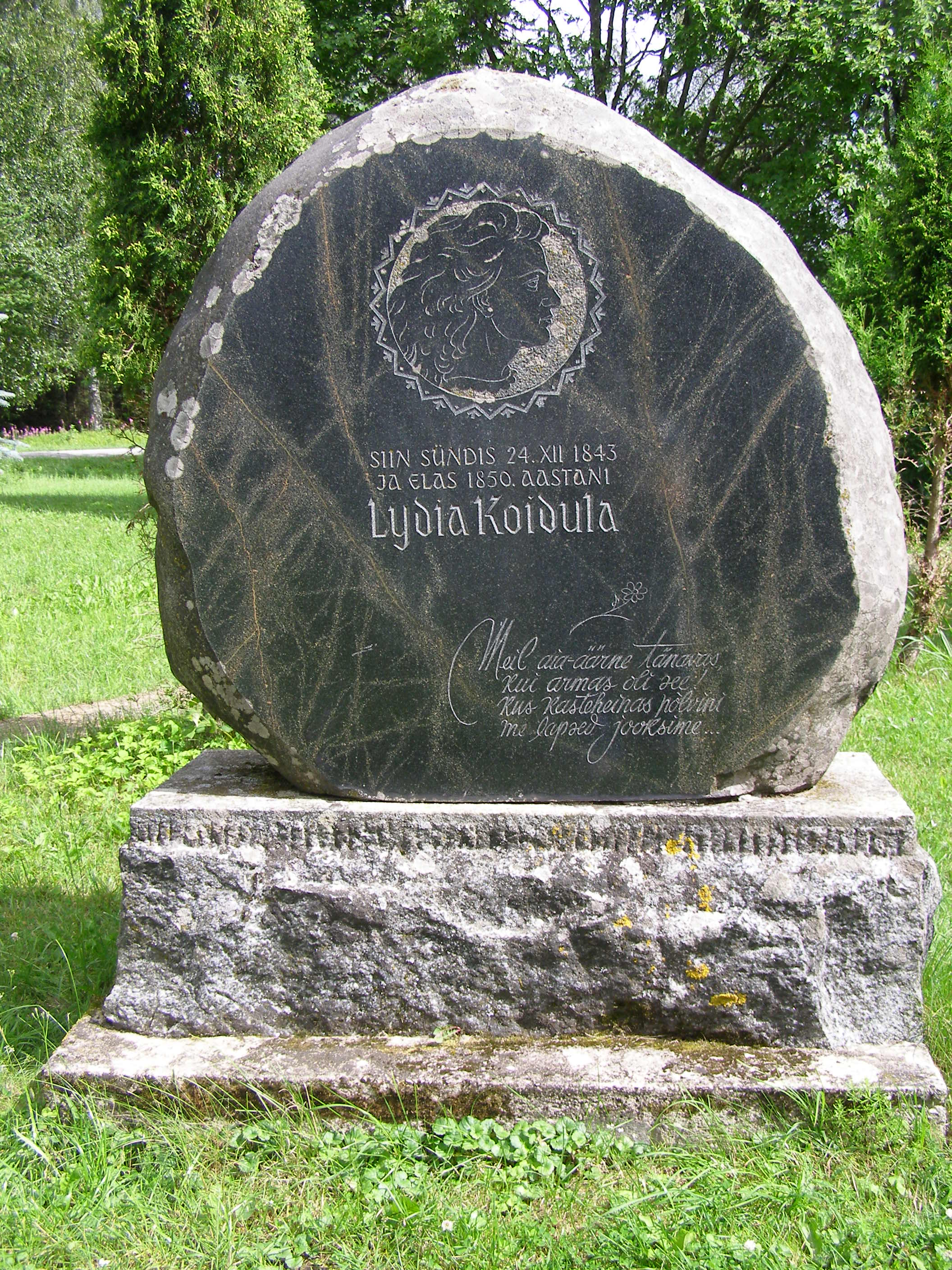
Memorial stone for Lydia Koidula at her birthplace near Vändra

Koidula is also considered a founder of Estonian theatre through her drama activities at the Vanemuine Society. The society was started by the Jannsens in Tartu in 1865 to promote Estonian culture.

Koidula was among the Estonian playwrights who wrote original plays and addressed stage direction and production. Although there were some Estonian plays at the German theatre in Tallinn in the early 19th century, theatre was not appreciated as a medium. Though Kreutzwald had translated two verse tragedies, few Estonian writers considered drama important.

In the late 1860s, both Estonians and Finns began staging performances in their native tongues, and Koidula, following suit, wrote and directed the comedy, Saaremaa Onupoeg (The Cousin from Saaremaa) in 1870 for the Vanemuine Society. It was based on Theodor Körner's (1791–1813) farce Der Vetter aus Bremen, (The Cousin from Bremen) adapted to an Estonian situation. The characterisation was rudimentary and the plot was simple but it was popular and Koidula went on to write and direct Maret ja Miina, (aka Kosjakased; The Betrothal Birches, 1870) and her own creation, the first ever completely Estonian play, Säärane mulk (What a Bumpkin!).

Koidula's attitude to the theatre was influenced by the philosopher, dramatist, and critic Gotthold Ephraim Lessing (1729–1781), the author of Erziehung des Menschengeschlechts (The Education of the Human Race; 1780). Her plays were didactic and a vehicle for popular education. Koidula's theatrical resources were few and raw. However, the qualities that impressed her contemporaries were a gallery of believable characters and cognizance of contemporary situations.

At the first Estonian Song Festival, in 1869, an important rallying event of the Estonian clans, two poems were set to music with lyrics by Koidula: Sind Surmani (Till Death) and Mu isamaa on minu arm (My Country is My Love), which became the unofficial anthem during the Soviet occupation when her father's Mu isamaa, mu õnn ja rõõm (My Country is My Pride and Joy), the anthem of the Estonian Republic between 1921 and 1940, was forbidden. Koidula's song always finished every festival, with or without permission. The tradition persists to this day.

== Memorial Museum of Lydia Koidula ==
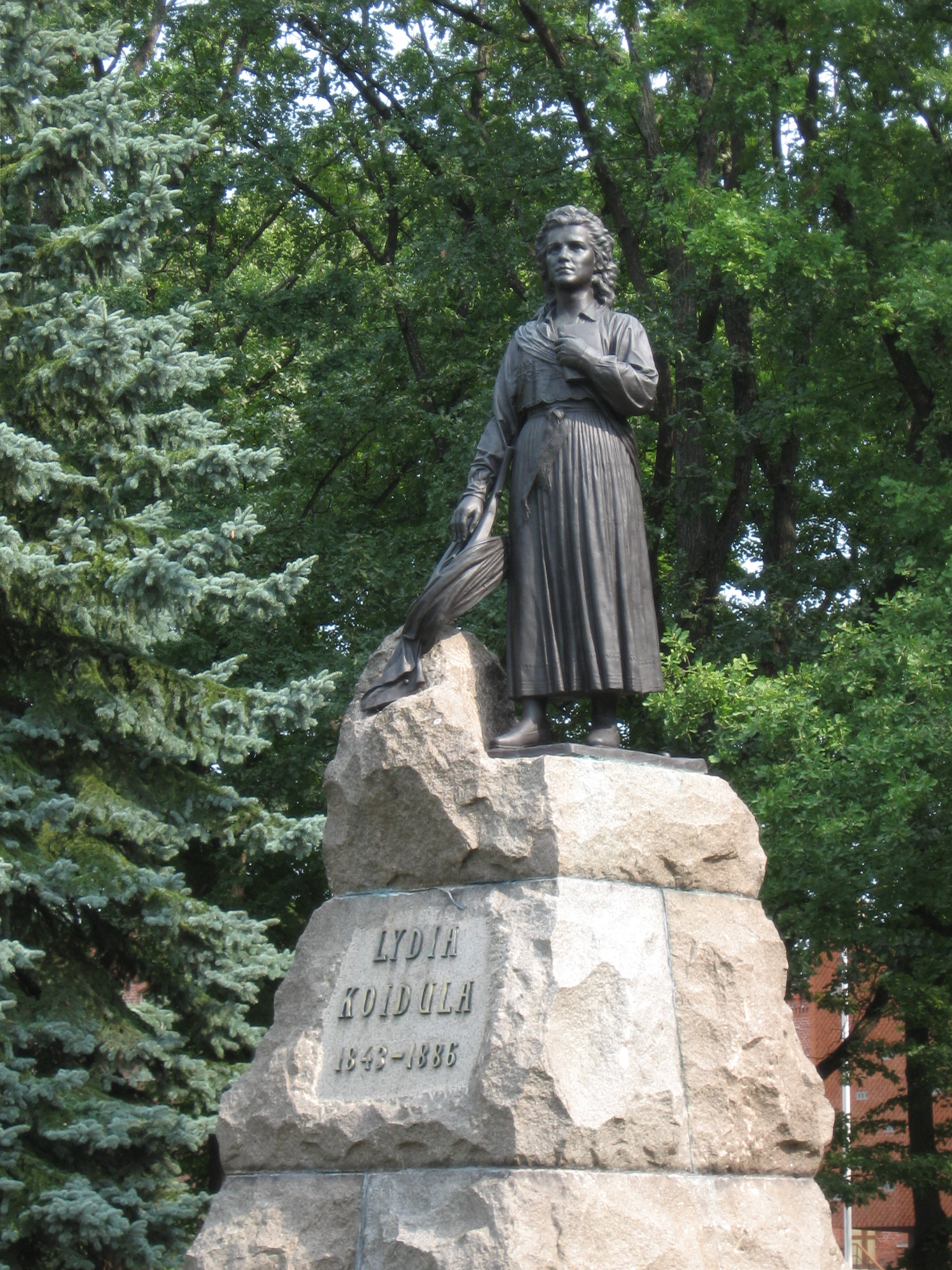
Monument to Lydia Koidula in Pärnu created by Amandus Adamson.

A branch of the Pärnu Museum, the museum gives an overview of the life and work of poet Lydia Koidula and her father, Johann Voldemar Jannsen (author of the lyrics of the Estonian anthem), important figures in the Estonian national awakening period in the 19th century.

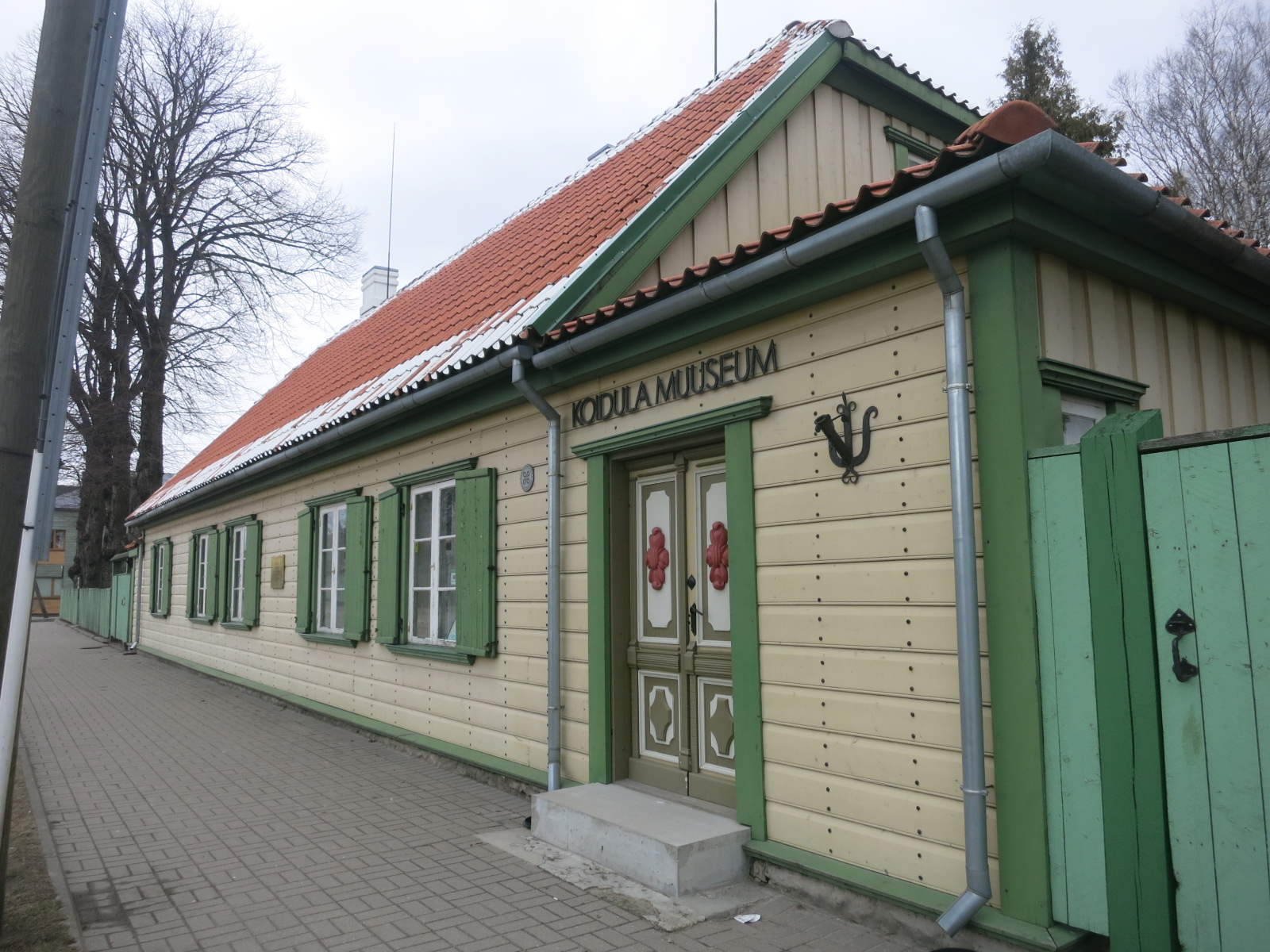
The Koidula Museum in Pärnu

Koidula grew up in a house in Pärnu, which is now the Koidula Museum. The Koidula museum is located in the Pärnu Ülejõe schoolhouse. The building was constructed in 1850 and has a unique interior. It was the home of Johann Voldemar Jannsen and the editorial office of the Perno Postimees newspaper until 1863 and is now protected as a historical monument.

The museum introduces Koidula and Jannsen and their life and work in the context of the period of national awakening in Estonia through the permanent exposition.

There is a monument of Lydia Koidula in the city center of Pärnu next to the historical building of Victoria Hotel on the corner of Kuninga and Lõuna street. The monument dates to 1929 and was the last work by Estonian sculptor Amandus Adamson. Finally, she was on the pre-euro 100 krooni banknote.
