= Mu isamaa on minu arm =

Poem by Lydia Koidula

My Fatherland is my Love
- by Lydia Koidula
- Original title: Mu isamaa on minu arm
- Country: Estonia
- Language: Estonian

"Mu isamaa on minu arm" ("My Fatherland is My Love") is an Estonian poem by Lydia Koidula. The poem was first set to music for the first Estonian Song Festival in 1869 by Aleksander Kunileid.

"Mu isamaa on minu arm" became a popular patriotic song when a new melody was composed by Gustav Ernesaks in 1944. Beginning in 1947, it is always the last song performed at the Estonian Song Festival. During the Soviet regime, "Mu isamaa on minu arm" became an unofficial national anthem.

== Lyrics ==
Estonian text by Lydia Koidula

Mo issama on minno arm,
Kel süddant annud ma,
Sull’ laulan ma, mo üllem õn,
Mo õitsew Eestima!
So wallo süddames mul keeb,
So õn ja rõõm mind rõõmsaks teeb,
Mo issama!

Mo issama on minno arm,
Ei tedda jätta ma,
Ja peaks sadda surma ma
Sepärrast surrema!
Kas laimab wõera kaddedus,
Sa siiski ellad süddames,
Mo issama!

Mo issama on minno arm,
Ja tahhan puhkada,
So rüppe heidan unnele,
Mo pühha Eestima!
So linnud und mull’ laulawad,
Mo põrmust lilled õitsetad,
Mo issama!

Alternate text

Mo isamaa on minu arm,
kell’ südant annud ma,
sull’ laulan ma, mo ülem õn,
mo õitsew Eestimaa!
So walu südames mul keeb,
so õn ja rõõm mind rõõmsaks teeb,
mo isamaa, mo isamaa, mo isamaa!

Mo isamaa on minu arm,
ei teda jätta ma,
ja peaks sada surma ma
seepärast surema!
Kás laimab wõera kadedus,
sa siiski elad südames,
mo isamaa, mo isamaa, mo isamaa!

Mo isamaa on minu arm,
ja tahan puhkada,
so rüppe heidan unele,
mo püha Eestimaa!
So linnud und mull’ laulawad,
mo põrmust lilled õitsetad,
mo isamaa, mo isamaa, mo isamaa!

Modern spelling

Mu isamaa on minu arm,
kel südant annud ma.
Sull' laulan ma, mu ülem õnn,
mu õitsev Eestimaa!
Su valu südames mul keeb,
su õnn ja rõõm mind rõõmsaks teeb,
mu isamaa, mu isamaa!

Mu isamaa on minu arm,
ei teda jäta ma,
ja peaksin sada surma ma
see pärast surema!
Kas laimab võõra kadedus,
sa siiski elad südames,
mu isamaa, mu isamaa!

Mu isamaa on minu arm,
ja tahan puhata,
su rüppe heidan unele,
mu püha Eestimaa!
Su linnud und mull' laulavad,
mu põrmust lilled õitsetad,
mu isamaa, mu isamaa!

English translation

My fatherland is my love,
To whom I give my heart.
To thee I sing, my greatest joy,
My blossoming Estonia!
Thy pain boileth in my heart,
Thy pride and joy make me happy,
My fatherland, my fatherland!

My fatherland is my love,
Never shall I leave him,
Even if I die a hundred deaths
All because of him!
Though foreign envy slander thee,
Thou still livest in my heart,
My fatherland, my fatherland!

My Fatherland is my love,
And in thee I want to rest,
To lie down into thine arms,
My sacred Estonia!
Thy birds will sing to me,
Flowers will bloom from my ashes,
My fatherland, my fatherland!
