= Sakala (newspaper) =

Estonian newspaper

- Type: Daily newspaper
- Format: Compact
- Owner(s): AS Ühinenud Ajalehed
- Publisher: Peep Kala
- Editor: Hans Väre
- Founded: 1878
- Headquarters: Viljandi
- Circulation: 8900
- Website: Official website

Sakala is an Estonian language daily newspaper first published in Viljandi on 11 March 1878 by Carl Robert Jakobson, a major figure of the Estonian national awakening period in the 19th century. It was considered as having a more radical line than the moderate Olevik.

Sakala was the first political newspaper in Estonian. It was the most popular newspaper among Estonians in the late 19th century. Today, it is the local newspaper of Viljandi County.

The masthead logo of Sakala was designed by Eduard Magnus Jakobson.
