= Carl Robert Jakobson =

Estonian writer and politician (1841–1882)

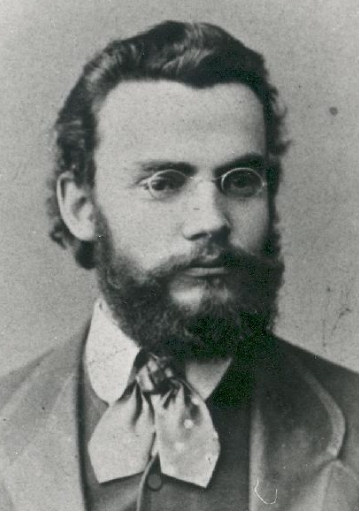
- Born: 26 July 1841; Dorpat, Kurgja, Vändra Parish, Governorate of Livonia, Russian Empire
- Died: 19 March 1882 (aged 40); Kurgja, Vändra Parish, Pärnumaa, Governorate of Livonia, Russian Empire
- Resting place: Kurgja cemetery
- Occupations: Writer; politician; journalist; teacher
- Movement: Estonian national awakening
- Children: Linda Jakobson
- Family: Eduard Magnus Jakobson (brother)

Carl Robert Jakobson (pseudonym C. R. Linnutaja; 26 July 1841 Tartu – 19 March 1882 Kurgja) was an Estonian writer, publicist, educator, journalist, musician, and cultural figure. He wrote under the pen name Linnutaja. He was one of the most important persons of the Estonian national awakening in the second half of the 19th century.

== Early life ==
Jakobson was born into the family of a church music teacher. Carl Robert Jakobson's father was Adam Jakobson, a teacher at the Torma parish school.

Jakobson received his initial education from his father in Torma. From 1856 to 1859, he studied at Janis Cimze's seminar in Valga. Beginning in 1859, Carl Robert worked in his father's place at the school in Torma.

Ants Laikmaa's portrait of Jackobson

He spent his childhood in Torma and received his primary education from his father and at the local parish school. From 1856 to 1859, he studied at the Jānis Cimze seminary in Valga.

At age 18, following the early death of his father, C. R. Jakobson was forced to support a family of seven in Torma. This included his paternal grandmother, mother, two brothers, and three sisters. When he moved to Yamburg, his 17-year-old brother Friedrich Cornelius Jakobson (1845–1879) remained behind in Estonia, becoming an estate manager at Kivijärve Manor in Laiuse Parish at that young age.

His sister was Natalie Auguste Johanson-Pärna (1843–1915) and his younger brother, Eduard Magnus Jakobson, was a well-known graphic artist and book illustrator.

== Early career ==
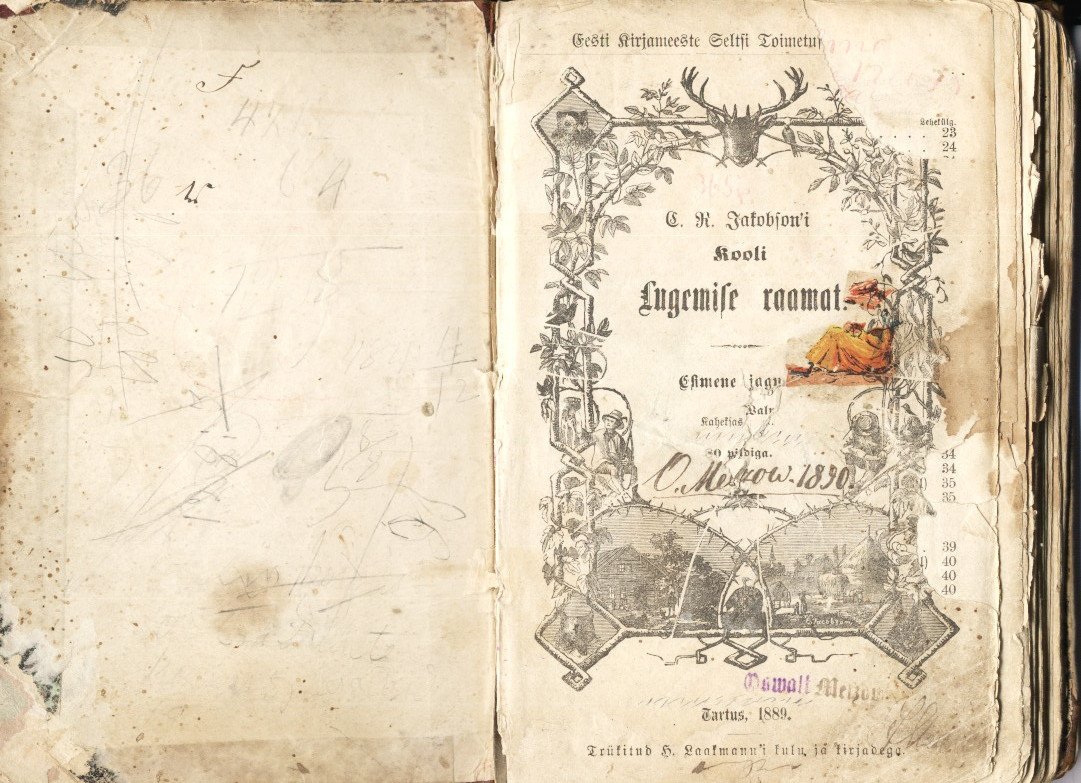
C. R. Jakobson's "School Reading Book", Part I (1867)

From 1859 to 1862, Jakobson succeeded his father as a teacher at the Torma parish school.

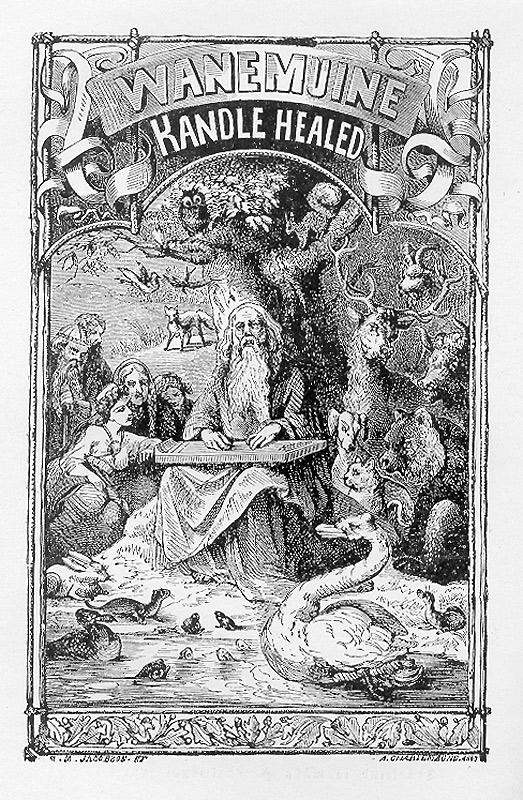
Cover of C. R. Jakobson's song collection "Wanemuine kandle healed" (1869)

He came into conflict with the local landowner Otto von Liphart and pastor Carl Landesen, and in the autumn of 1861, he resigned from his position. In 1862, a conflict arose between him and the local pastor and landowner, causing Jakobson to leave Torma and teach in Yamburg. In 1862, Jakobson became a pastor for German colonists in Yamburg within the St. Petersburg consistorial district. He was subordinate to Konstantin Hunnius, the pastor of St. John's Church in Narva, who—under the influence of a Torma pastor, Landesen, began to harass Jakobson. Consequently, he resigned from his post in Yamburg a couple of years later, as Hunnius's harassment had severely worsened his financial situation.

From 1864 he went to Saint Petersburg. Initially, he gave private lessons. From 1864, he worked as a school and private tutor serving as a junior-class German teacher and boarding school supervisor at St. Petersburg Private Gymnasium No. 1 (Keller's Gymnasium).

Then from 1865 he taught German language and literature at a gymnasium. In 1865, he received the qualification of senior school teacher in German language and literature and began working as a gymnasium teacher at the same school. In St. Petersburg, he taught Olga, the daughter of Grand Duke Konstantin Nikolayevich of Russia, who later became Queen Olga of Greece as the wife of King George I.

From 1872 to 1874, he worked as a municipal clerk in Vana-Vändra and Uue-Vändra parishes and worked as a publicist in Vändra.

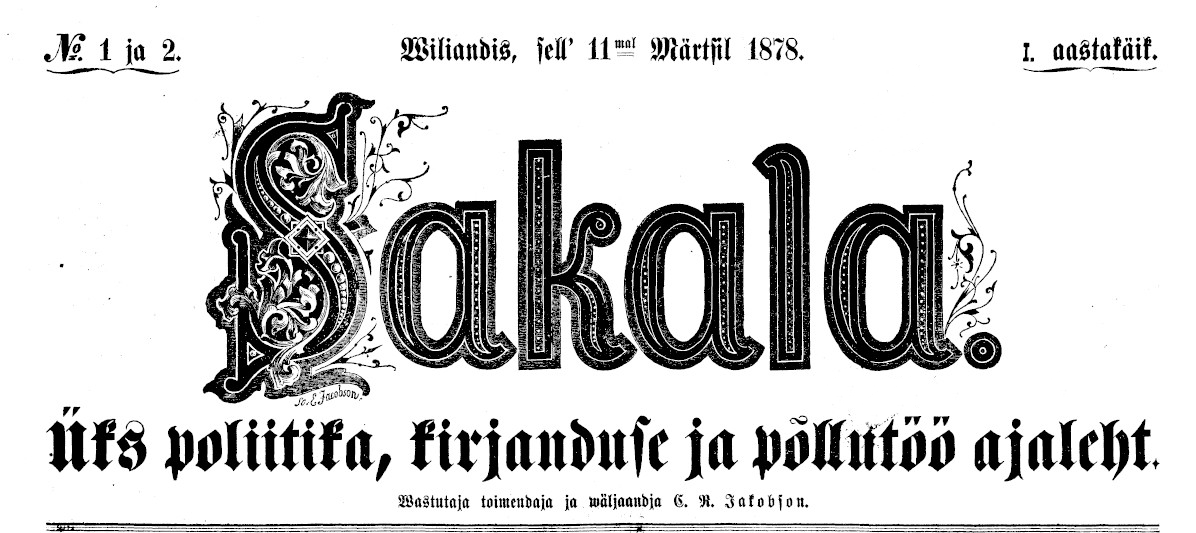
Header of the first issues of Sakala newspaper (1878).

== Activism ==
Jakobson increasingly devoted himself to activism. Between 1860 and 1880, the Governornate of Livonia was led by a moderate nobility-dominated government under which Jakobson became the leader of the radical wing, advocating widespread reforms in Livonia. Jakobson was responsible for the economic-political program of the Estonian national movement. Jakobson urged Estonians to demand equal political rights with the region's Germans and an end to privileged position of the Baltic German nobility.

== Attempts to start a newspaper and writing for Postimees (1865-1871) ==
In Saint Petersburg, Carl Robert came into close contact with the Estonian democratic intelligentsia. Jakobson joined the St. Petersburg Patriots circle and, influenced by the group, began his career as a publicist and schoolbook author.

In 1865, he began sending articles to Eesti Postimees, and later to liberal Russian and German-language newspapers. In 1868, his request to establish an Estonian-language newspaper called Valgus in St. Petersburg was rejected by tsarist authorities.

In 1871, Jakobson moved to Tallinn Jakobson moved to Tallinn, but he was again denied permission to establish an Estonian-language newspaper.

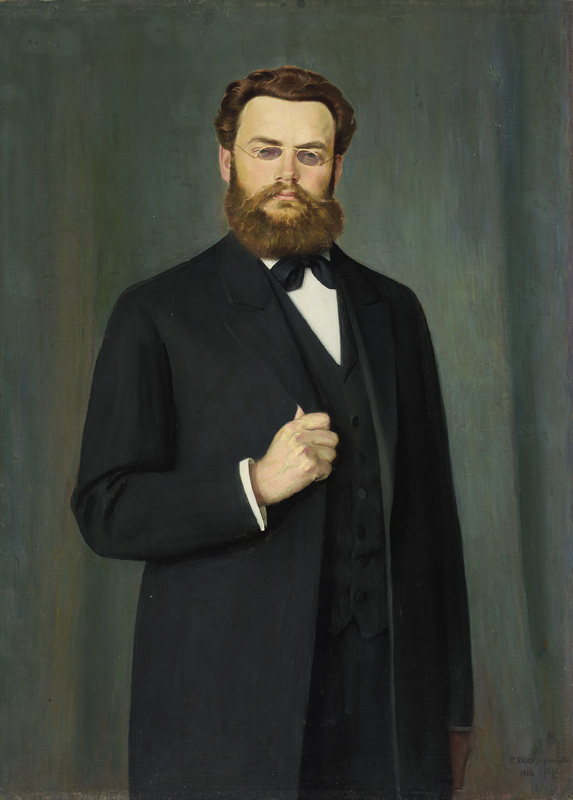
C. R. Jakobson (portrayed by Paul Raud)

== Agricultural work (1868) ==
Jakobson was elected president of the Pärnu Estonian Farmers' Society and the Viljandi Estonian Farmers' Society. In these societies, he delivered speeches on agricultural knowledge and innovative technology, and presented plans for agricultural development. He was interested in addressing the economic and legal status of the people.

In 1868 and 1870, Carl Robert delivered various speeches at the Vanemuine theatre society. In 1870 these speeches were published in a single book and positively influenced the development of Estonian national self-awareness.

In 1874, Jakobson purchased Kurgja farm near Vändra, intending to turn it into a model farm in the same parish. That same year, he organized Estonia's first ploughing competition in Vändra. Soon after, Jakobson was elected president of the agricultural societies of Pärnu and Viljandi.

== Sakala, the first Estonian language newspaper (1878) ==
In 1878, Jakobson established the first Estonian-language political newspaper Sakala in Viljandi. His main assistants in the editorial office were Jaak Järv and Jakob Kõrv.

The newspaper criticized the existing agrarian order, aristocratic power, and estate institutions, demanded up-to-date reforms, and called for the liberation of public schools from church control. This led to conflicts with Estonian-born pastors and ultimately the alienation of moderate figures of the national movement from Sakala. The conflict also spilled over into major national organizations.

The publication dedicated its issues to questions of social inequality, the difficult plight of the local peasantry, and the arbitrariness of large landowners. Because he was an educator by training, in his articles Jakobson insisted on greater independence of school education from church influence. He advocated for granting autonomy to Estonian territory, which sparked discussion in the political circles of the Estonian Governorate.

He wrote about the situation of the Estonian peasantry his works in Estonian and aimed to raise the educational level of common people and increase their agricultural income.

== Learned Estonian Society (1868) ==
He also played a role in the establishment of the Society of Estonian Literati or Learned Estonian Society, which was an Estonian association in the second half of the 19th century involved in Estonian self-determination.

Around 1868, Jakobson took part in the founding of the Estonian Literary Society (Eesti Kirjameeste Selts), which worked in Tartu from 1871 to 1893 to develop Estonian literature and language.

Jakobson participated in the establishment and activities of the Learned Estonian Society and the organization for founding the Estonian Alexander School, serving as a member of the Estonian Alexander School Main Committee from 1870 onward.

In 1881, folklorist Jakob Hurt supported the appointment of Jakobson as president. Jakobson was elected president of the Learned Estonian Society, succeeding Hurt.

== Writing ==
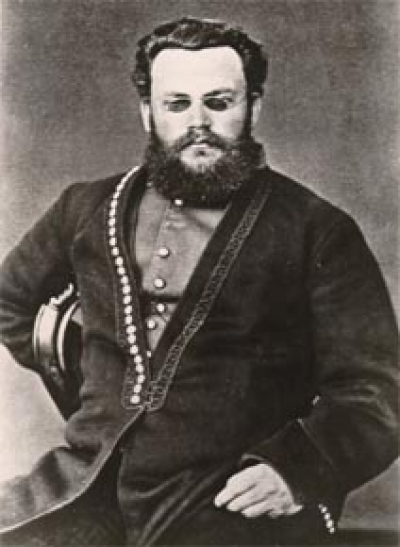
A portrait of Jakobson in a relaxed pose

He wrote various textbooks and study guides for public schools. Jakobson also gained fame through his collections of songs, where he gathered both Estonian folk songs and patriotic poems. In 1872, his play Artur ja Anna was staged and gained wide popularity in Estonia.

Jakobson was the first to provide Estonian peasants with scientific farm management instructions. He published the first Estonian agricultural textbook and manual, "Teadus ja Seadus põllul" (Part I, 1869), followed by books such as "Kuidas põllumees rikkaks saab" (1874), "Kuidas karjad ja nende saagid meie põllumeeste rikkuse allikaks saavad" (1876), and "Sakala Kalender põllumeestele" (1880). Through these works, he laid the foundation for Estonian agricultural literature.

Jakobson's school textbooks greatly influenced the development of Estonian public schools and pedagogy. The first part of his "School Reading Book" (three parts; 1867–1876) went through 15 editions over 40 years. His "New Primer..." (1867), "Little Geography" (1868), and the girls' school reader "Helmed" (1880) also came into widespread use. In journalism, he fought for improving school conditions and freeing them from church influence.

He advocated for original repertoires for Estonian choir singing and published music collections such as "Wanemuine kandle healed" (two booklets, 1869–1871) and "Rõõmus laulja" (1872). Inseparable from his civic work was Jakobson's patriotic poetry (the collection "C. R. Linnutaja laulud", 1870, including translations from German poetry classics) and his widely performed play "Artur ja Anna" (1872), which criticized estate inequality.

All of Jakobson's works were published in the new literary orthography.

== Selected works ==
- Kooli Lugemise raamatu (1867–1876)
- Uus Aabitsaraamat (1867)
- Veikene Geograafia (1868)
- Teadus ja Seadus põllul (1869)
- Wanemuine Kandle healed (Lieder für Chor, 1869–1871)
- C. R. Linnutaja laulud (Gesangheft, 1870)
- Rõõmus laulja (1872)
- Artur ja Anna (Theaterstück, 1872)
- Kuidas põllumees rikkaks saab (1874)
- Kuidas karjad ja nende saagid meie põllumeeste rikkuse allikaks saavad (1876)
- Sakala Kalender põllumeestele (1880)
- Helmed (Lesebuch, 1880)
- "Valitud teosed I-II" (Selected Works I-II), compiled by Rudolf Põldmäe. Eesti Riiklik Kirjastus. Tallinn 1959.

== Personal Life ==
Two of Jakobson's children died before their baptism. In 1875, the first child of Carl Robert Jakobson and his wife Julie Emilie (née Thal, 1850–1940), a daughter named Olga, was born. Julie Emilie and their four daughters (Olga, Linda, Ida, Elsa) belonged to the German congregation of the Vändra Lutheran parish.

== Death and legacy ==
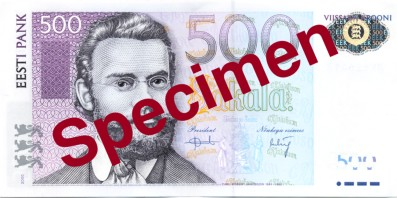
Estonian 500 krooni banknote featuring Carl Robert Jakobson.

Jakobson died on 19 March 1882, at the age of 40 in the village of Kurgja, where he lived in Kurgja Manor. In the late winter of 1882, Jakobson had fallen ill with pneumonia. Estonians suspected foul play by a doctor, finding it strange that such a large, strong, healthy man could die a natural death. He was buried in the family cemetery at Kurgja farm.

=== Museum ===
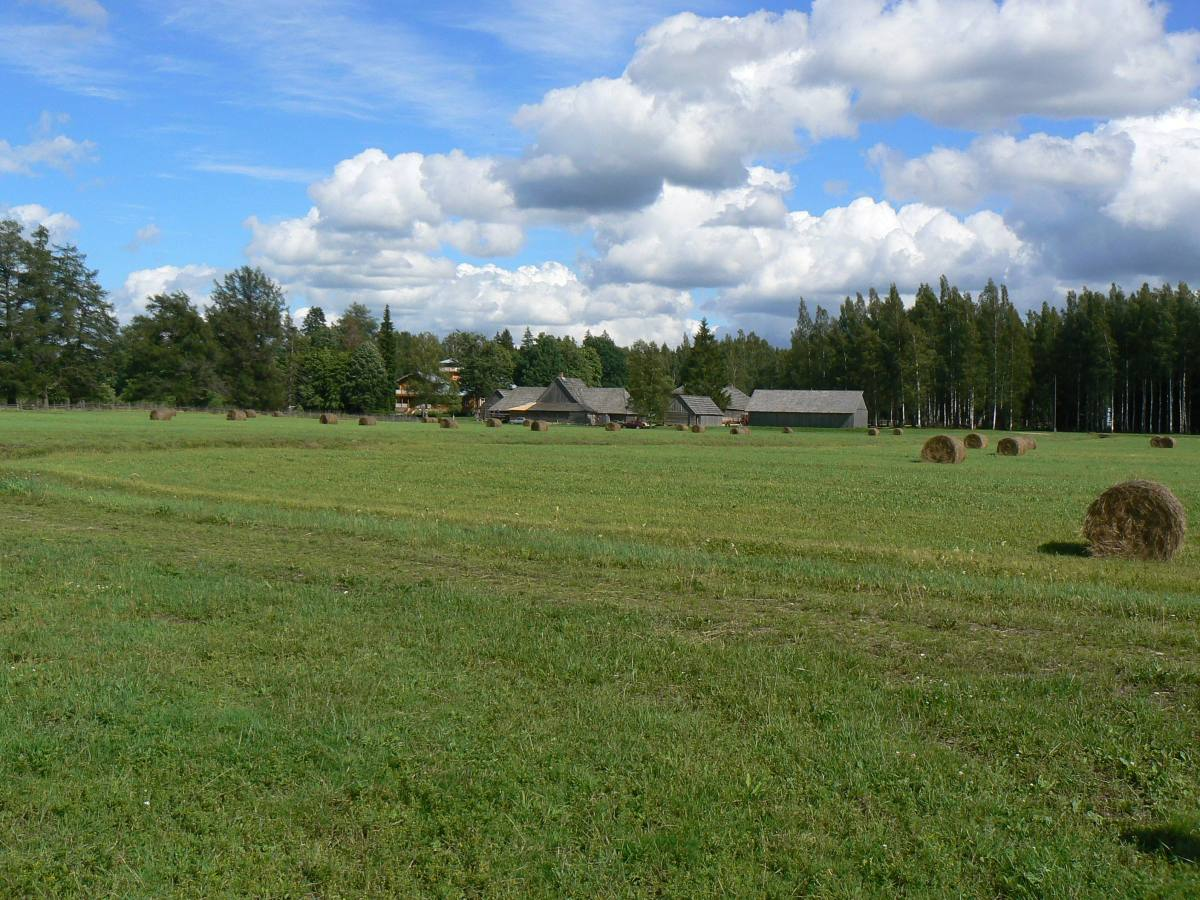
The Carl Robert Jakobson Museum in Kurgja

In 1948, Jakobson's eldest daughter, Linda Jakobson, founded a museum in his honor at their family estate in Kurgja (Pärnumaa, Vändra), the Museum of Carl Robert Jakobson.

At the Museum of Carl Robert Jakobson, the main house of the museum includes an exhibition which introduces the life and activities Jakobsonand elements of rural Estonian life during his era. As such, the museum maintains an active farm with cattle-breeding and cultivation.

== Monuments ==
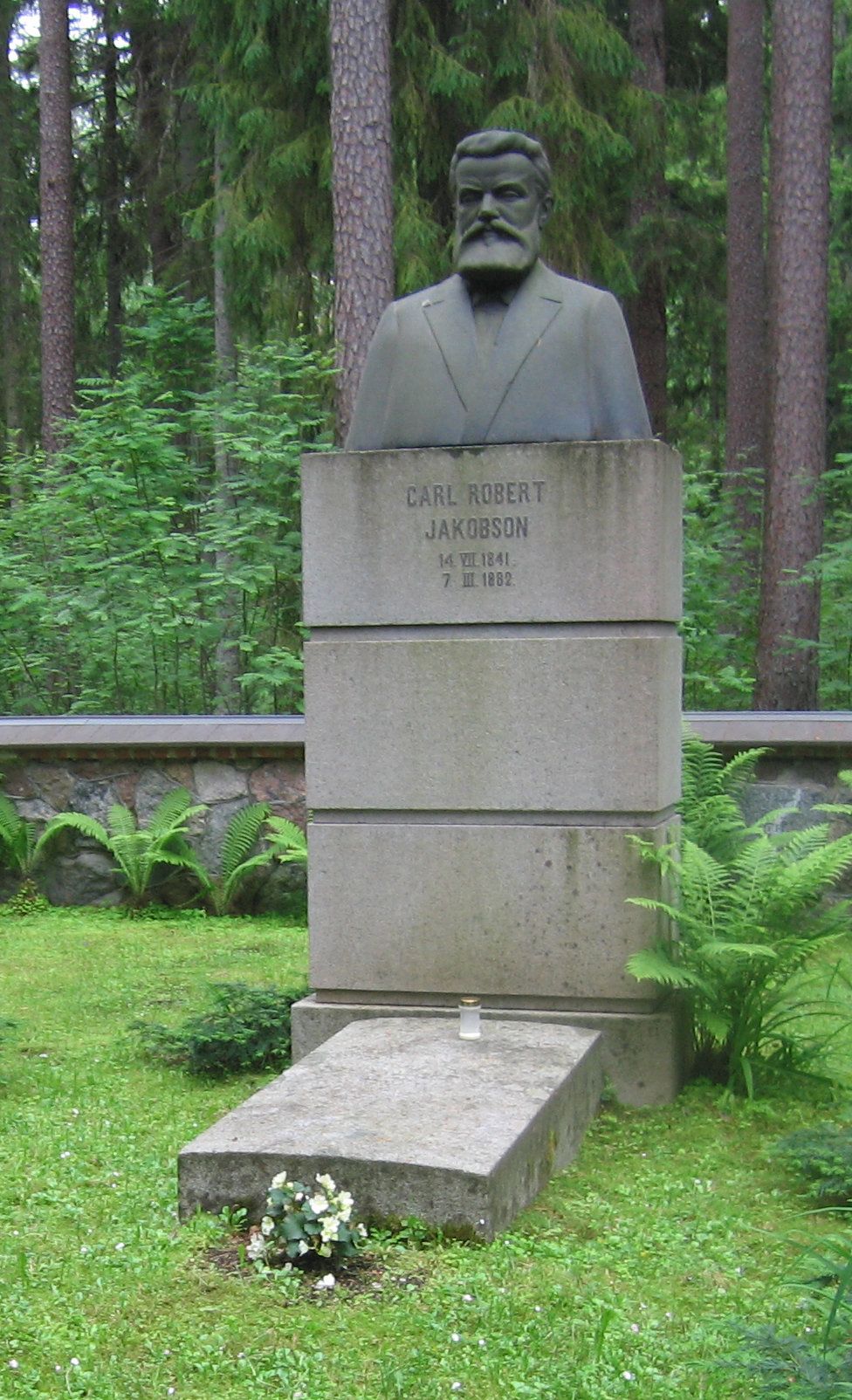
Sculpture at the grave of Carl Robert Jakobson

C. R. Jakobson is considered one of the leading figures in the awakening of the Estonian national consciousness. Monuments him were erected in Torma (in 1957) and Viljandi (in 1993). In 1998, a monument to Carl Robert Jakobson by sculptor Mati Karmin was erected in Viljandi.

In 1927, a monument was unveiled at his grave in the Kurgja farm cemetery (sculptors Jaan Koort and Ferdi Sannamees). In 1993, a monument was unveiled in Viljandi (sculptor Mati Karmin and architect Tiit Trummal).In 1957, a monument to Jakobson was erected near the Torma school (sculptor Roman Haavamägi).

== Other honours ==
In 1956, Viljandi 1st Secondary School was named after C. R. Jakobson; since 2012, it has been known as the Viljandi Jakobson School.

In 2012, Viljandi 1st Gymnasium was named in honor of the writer.

Torma Basic School in Jõgeva County is also named Carl Robert Jakobsoni nimeline Torma Põhikool. Since 2011, Torma Basic School has awarded the C. R. Jakobson Scholarship.

Many streets are named after Jakobson in many populated areas across Estonia in several Estonian towns and settlements as "C. R. Jakobson" or "Jakobson".

From 1992 to 2010, prior to the adoption of the euro, his face was featured on the Estonian kroon on the largest banknote, the 500 kroon.

== In film ==
In 1982, the documentary film Carl Robert Jakobson was released by Eesti Telefilm. The documentary film about Jakobson was titled "Carl Robert Jakobson" (director Mati Põldre, 1982).

== See also ==
- Aleksander Eduard Thomson (brother-in-law)
