= Estonian national awakening =

1850s–1918 period of Estonian nationalism

The Estonian Age of Awakening (Estonian: Ärkamisaeg) is a period in history where Estonians came to acknowledge themselves as a nation deserving the right to govern themselves. This period is considered to begin in the 1850s with greater rights being granted to commoners and to end with the declaration of the Republic of Estonia in 1918.

== History ==
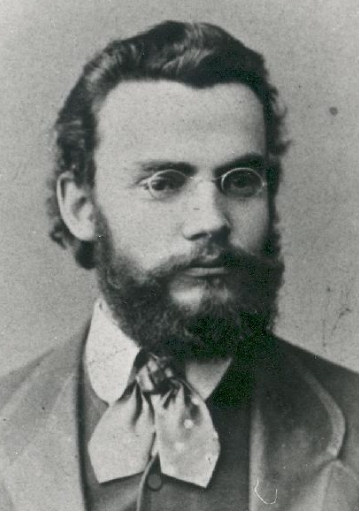
Carl Robert Jakobson

Although Estonian national consciousness spread in the course of the 19th century, some degree of ethnic awareness in the literate middle class preceded this development. By the 18th century the self-denomination eestlane (Estonian) along with the older maarahvas (country folk) spread among Estonians in the then provinces of Estonia and Livonia of the Russian Empire. The Bible was translated in 1739, and the number of books and brochures published in Estonian increased from 18 in the 1750s to 54 in the 1790s. By the end of the 18th century more than half of the country's rural adult male population was able to read, and the literacy rate in urban areas was already significantly higher.

The first university-educated intellectuals identifying themselves as Estonians, including Friedrich Robert Faehlmann (1798–1850), Kristjan Jaak Peterson (1801–1822) and Friedrich Reinhold Kreutzwald (1803–1882), came to prominence in the 1820s. The ruling elite had remained predominantly German in language and culture since the conquest of the early 13th century. Garlieb Merkel (1769–1850), a Baltic German Estophile, was the first author to treat the Estonians explicitly as a nationality equal to others; he became a source of inspiration for the Estonian national movement, modelled on Baltic German cultural world before the middle of the 19th century. However, in the middle of the century the Estonians, with such leaders as Carl Robert Jakobson (1841–1882), Jakob Hurt (1839–1907) and Johann Voldemar Jannsen (1819–1890), became more ambitious in their political demands and started leaning towards the Finns as a successful model of national movement and, to some extent, the neighbouring Young Latvian national movement. Significant accomplishments were the publication of the national epic, Kalevipoeg, in 1862, and the organization of the first national song festival in 1869. By the end of the 1860s the Estonians became unwilling to remain reconciled with German cultural and political hegemony. Before the attempts at Russification in the 1880s–1890s their view of Imperial Russia remained positive.

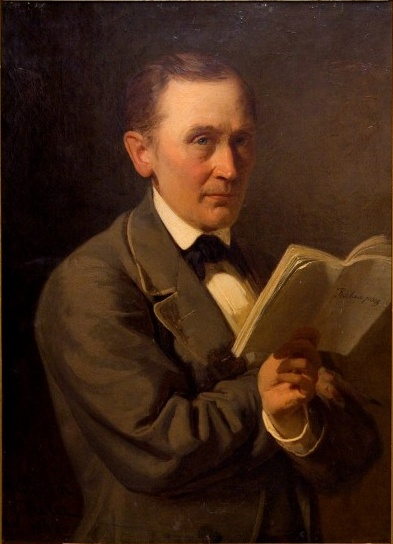
Friedrich Reinhold Kreutzwald reads the manuscript of Kalevipoeg. Painting by Johann Köler.

In 1881, seventeen Estonian societies, in a memorandum inspired by Carl Robert Jakobson, called upon Emperor Alexander III of Russia for the introduction of zemstvo institutions (which had already existed in most parts of the Empire), with equal representation for Estonians and Baltic Germans and administrative unification of the ethnic Estonian areas. Postimees, the first Estonian daily, began appearing in 1891. According to the 1897 census, the Estonians had the second highest literacy rate in the Russian Empire after the Finns in the Grand Duchy of Finland (96.1% of the Estonian-speaking population of the Baltic Provinces 10 years and older, roughly equally for males and females). The cities became Estonicized quickly, and in 1897 ethnic Estonians comprised two-thirds of the total Estonian urban population.

In response to a period of Russification initiated by the Russian empire in the 1880s, Estonian nationalism took on even more political tones, with intellectuals calling for greater autonomy. As the Russian Revolution of 1905 swept through Estonia, the Estonians called for freedom of the press and assembly, for universal franchise, and for national autonomy. Estonian gains were minimal, but the tense stability that prevailed between 1905 and 1917 allowed Estonians to advance the aspiration of national statehood. Following the February Revolution of 1917 Estonian lands were for the first time united in one administrative unit, the autonomous Governorate of Estonia. After the Bolshevik takeover of power in Russia in 1917, and the following successful German invasion further into Soviet Russia, Estonia declared itself an independent nation on 24 February 1918.

The terms "national awakening", "era of new awakening", or similar, have more recently been applied sometimes also to the period of Estonian history around 1987 and 1988 (also known as the beginning of the Singing Revolution).

== See also ==
- Estophilia, a Baltic German movement that led to and promoted the Estonian national awakening
- Finnish Nationalism
- The First Latvian National Awakening
- Lithuanian national awakening
