= Euro commemorative coins =

The nations of the European Union issue commemorative coins in various denominations. These include:

- Euro gold and silver commemorative coins of various face values.
- €2 commemorative coins.
