= List of 2 euro commemorative coins (2004–2009) =

Commemorative coins of the Eurozone 2004-2009

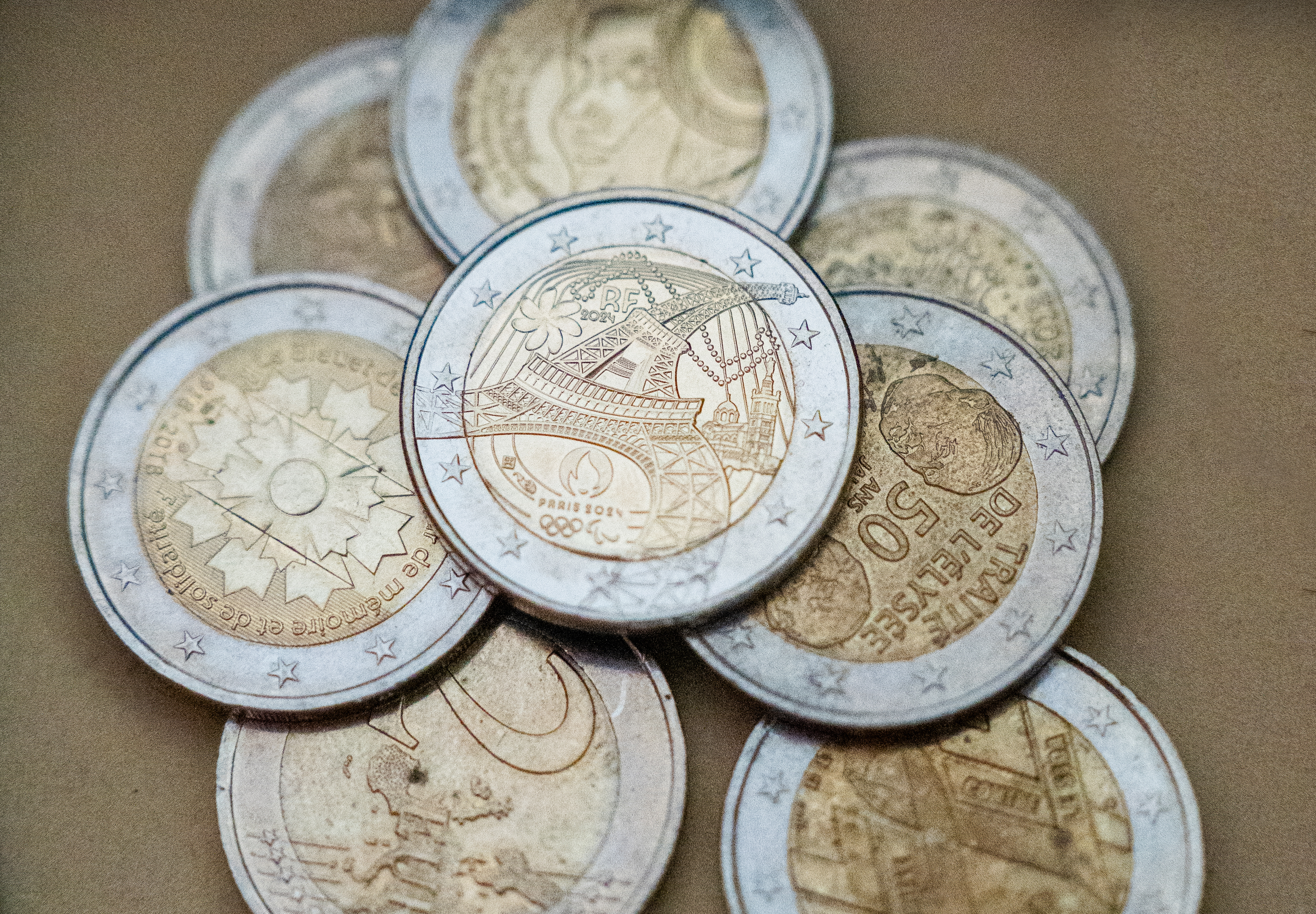
2 euro commemorative coins

€2 commemorative coins are special euro coins that have been minted and issued by member states of the eurozone since 2004 as legal tender in all eurozone member states.

€2 coins are the only denomination intended for circulation that may be issued as commemorative coins. Only the national obverse sides of the commemorative coins differ; the common reverse sides do not. The coins typically commemorate the anniversaries of historical events or current events of special importance.

Since 2012, the number of commemorative coins has been limited to two per country per year; previously only one was allowed. Issues of common commemoratives do not count towards the limit. The total number of commemorative coins placed in circulation per year is also limited. The commemorative coins must follow the design standards stipulated for regular €2 coins, with design limitations to guarantee uniformity.

Up to the end of 2025, 584 variations of €2 commemorative coins have been issued (including three scheduled coins from Vatican City). Finland, Italy, Luxembourg, San Marino and the Vatican City are the only countries to have released at least one commemorative coin every year since 2004.

Though they have become collectibles, €2 commemoratives are different from non-standard denomination commemorative euro coins, which are officially designated as "collector coins", not intended for circulation and usually made of precious metals.

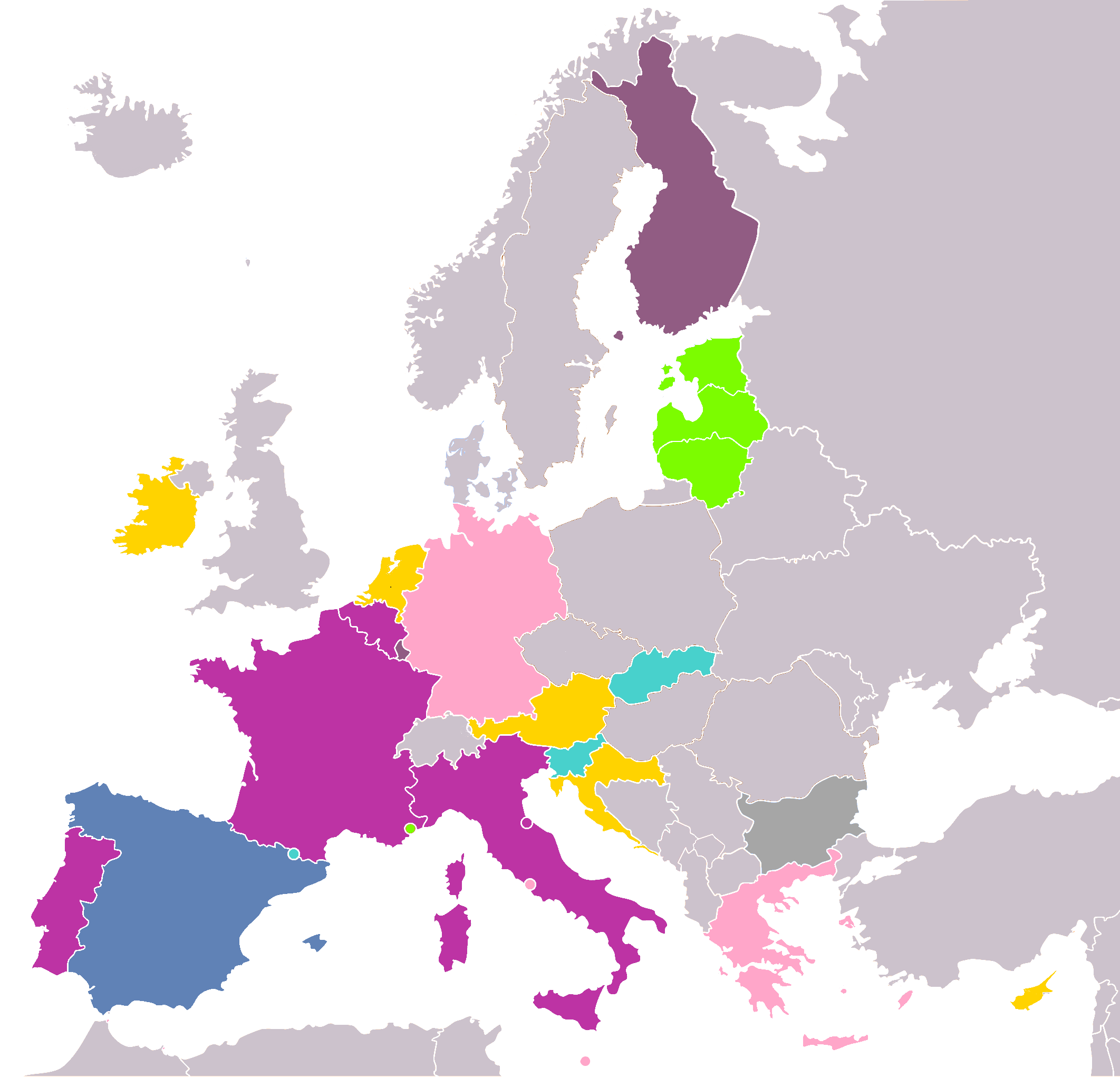
Color-coded map* of eurozone countries by number of €2 commemorative coins issued *State 1 October 2026 46 to 50 coins issued 41 to 45 coins issued 36 to 40 coins issued 31 to 35 coins issued 26 to 30 coins issued 21 to 25 coins issued 16 to 20 coins issued 11 to 15 coins issued 6 to 10 coins issued 1 to 5 coins issued no coins issued not part of the eurozone

== Issues ==
Common €2 commemorative coins issued 2004-2009 by all eurozone member states:

- European Union: 50 years since the Treaty of Rome in 2007.
- European Union: 10 years of the Economic and Monetary Union of the European Union in 2009.

Coins series with a specific theme (2004-2009):

- Germany:
  - Bundesländer I (2006–2022) – one coin per year for each of the 16 States of the Federal Republic of Germany.
- Luxembourg: Luxembourgish Grand-Ducal Dynasty (2004–future) – coins representing the Grand Ducal Family of Luxembourg.

Country	Issues	2004	2005	2006	2007		2008	2009	
Country	Issues	2004	2005	2006	reg.	ToR	2008	reg.	EMU
Andorra	0								
Austria	3		Y			Y			Y
Belgium	6		Y	Y		Y	Y	Y	Y
Bulgaria	0								
Croatia	0								
Cyprus	1								Y
Estonia	0								
Finland	8	Y	Y	Y	Y	Y	Y	Y	Y
France	3					Y	Y		Y
Germany	6			Y	Y	Y	Y	Y	Y
Greece	3	Y				Y			Y
Ireland	2					Y			Y
Italy	7	Y	Y	Y		Y	Y	Y	Y
Latvia	0								
Lithuania	0								
Luxembourg	8	Y	Y	Y	Y	Y	Y	Y	Y
Malta	1								Y
Monaco	1				Y				
Netherlands	2					Y			Y
Portugal	5				Y	Y	Y	Y	Y
San Marino	6	Y	Y	Y	Y		Y	Y	
Slovakia	3						Y	Y	Y
Slovenia	3					Y	Y		Y
Spain	3		Y			Y			Y
Vatican City	6	Y	Y	Y	Y		Y	Y	
Total	76	6	8	7	7	13	10	9	16
Y – yes / was either not yet part of the eurozone or authorized to mint euro coins; no / S – scheduled

Issued designs are made public in the Official Journal of the European Union. Although the volume and issue date of the coins are listed in the official journal, the actual figures sometimes deviate considerably from those published.

=== 2004 coinage ===
Image	Country	Feature	Volume	Date
	Greece	Summer Olympics in Athens 2004	50 million coins	14 March 2004
The twelve stars of the European Union positioned around the outer circle surround the design of an ancient statue depicting a discobolus in his attempt to throw the discus. The base of the statue covers a small part of the coin's external ring (outer part). To the left is the logo of the Olympic Games 'ATHENS 2004' and the five Olympic circles, and to the right, one above the other, are the figure '2' and the word 'ΕΥΡΩ'. The yearmark is written in split form around the star positioned bottom centre, as follows: 20*04 and the mintmark is above the athlete's head to the left.
	Finland	Fifth Enlargement of the European Union in 2004	1 million coins	FDI: 1 June 2004; FDC: 1 July 2004
The design describes a stylised pillar from which the sprouts grow upwards. The sprouts represent the enlargement of the European Union. The pillar represents the foundation for growth. Near the pillar there are the letters 'EU'. In the upper part of the coin there is the year '2004'. Twelve stars, together with the year, surround the design.
	Luxembourg	Effigy and Monogram of Grand Duke Henri	2,481,800 coins	23 June 2004
The coin depicts on the left hand of the inner part the effigy of His Royal Highness, the Grand-Duke Henri, looking to the right, and on the right hand the monogram of the Grand-Duke Henri (special letter 'H' topped with a crown). The 12 stars appear in semi-circular form at the right of the monogram. The year 2004, surrounded by the mint mark as well as the engraver's initials, and the word LËTZEBUERG are written in circular form at the top of the ring. The words 'HENRI — Grand-Duc de Luxembourg' appear at the bottom of the ring.
	Italy	Fifth Decade of the World Food Programme	16 million coins	15 December 2004
The foreground shows the globe, tilted to the right and bearing the inscription 'WORLD FOOD PROGRAMME', from which emerges an ear of wheat, an ear of maize and an ear of rice, the three grains representing the world's basic sources of nourishment. To the right of the globe is the I superimposed on an R denoting 'Repubblica Italiana', below which there appears a smaller combination of the letters U and P, the initials of the engraver, Uliana Pernazza. To the upper left of the globe there appears the mint mark 'R' and under the globe the year mark '2004'. The 12 stars of the European Union are positioned around the outer circle.
	San Marino	Bartolomeo Borghesi	110,000 coins	16 December 2004
The twelve stars of the European Union positioned around the outer circle of the coin and the issuing year '2004', positioned bottom centre, surround the bust of Bartolomeo Borghesi. To the left of the bust is the inscription 'Bartolomeo Borghesi', and one above the other are the letter 'R' and the engraver's initials 'E.L.F.'. To the right of the bust is the word 'San Marino'.
	Vatican City	75th anniversary of the Foundation of the Vatican City State	100,000 coins	16 December 2004
The inner part shows a schematic representation of the perimeter walls of the Vatican City with St Peter's Basilica in the foreground. The inscriptions '75o ANNO DELLO STATO' and '1929–2004' appear around the left- and upper right-hand edges of the inner part. To the bottom left, in smaller letters, is the name of the author 'VEROI' and the initials of the engraver 'L.D.S. INC.'. The twelve stars of the European Union and the inscription 'CITTA' DEL VATICANO' are positioned around the outer circle.

=== 2005 coinage ===
Image	Country	Feature	Volume	Date
	Luxembourg	50th birthday of Grand Duke Henri, 5th anniversary of his accession to the throne and 100th anniversary of the death of Grand Duke Adolphe	2,769,000 coins	15 January 2005
The coin depicts on the left-hand side of its inner part the effigy of His Royal Highness, the Grand Duke Henri, looking to the right, and superimposed on the effigy of the former Grand Duke Adolphe on the right-hand side of the inner part. Above the effigies appears, in semi-circular form, the legend 'GRANDS-DUCS DE LUXEMBOURG'. The text 'HENRI * 1955 ADOLPHE + 1905' is inscribed below their respective effigies. On the outer ring of the coin, the 12 stars surrounding the design are placed between the letters of the text 'LËTZEBUERG'. The date 2005 is inscribed below, flanked by the logo of the Mint and the letter 'S'.
	Belgium	Belgium-Luxembourg Economic Union	6 million coins	FDI: 1 March 2005; FDC: 1 April 2005
The effigies of Grand-Duke Henri of Luxembourg and King Albert II of Belgium are depicted in profile in the centre of the design. The profile of King Albert II is slightly superimposed on that of Grand-Duke Henri. Under the effigies appears the year mark '2005'. To the lower right there is a combination of the letters 'LL', the engraver's initials. The two effigies and the date are surrounded by the twelve stars and by the monograms of Grand-Duke Henri to the left and of King Albert II to the right. The mintmarks each appear between two stars, one on the left and one on the right of the bottom part of the outer circle.
	Spain	4th Centenary of the first edition of Miguel de Cervantes' El ingenioso hidalgo Don Quixote de la Mancha	8 million coins	1 April 2005
The inner part of the coin depicts an image of 'El Ingenioso Hidalgo Don Quijote de la Mancha', who appears holding a lance, and windmills in the background. To the left, there is a marked sector in which the word 'ESPAÑA' appears incused, and underneath this sector the MINT mark 'M'. On the outer ring of the coin, the twelve stars of the European Union are depicted, with, on the right, four of them (corresponding to the positions 1, 2, 3 and 4 on a clock) incused within an arc. The year of mintage appears at the bottom among three stars.
	Austria	50th anniversary of the Austrian State Treaty	7 million coins	11 May 2005
The outer ring bears the twelve stars of the European Union. The inner part shows a reproduction of the signatures and seals from the last page of the Austrian State Treaty, signed in May 1955 by the Foreign Ministers and the Ambassadors of the Soviet Union, Great Britain, USA and France, and the then Austrian Foreign Minister Leopold Figl, with the inscription '50 JAHRE STAATSVERTRAG' above the seals, running along the upper edge of the inner part in a quasi-semicircle slightly tilted to the right. At the bottom left is the year of issue, 2005. The vertically striped background of the inner part depicts the heraldic representation of the Austrian national colours (red-white-red).
	San Marino	World Year of Physics 2005	130,000 coins	14 October 2005
On the inner part of the coin is a free interpretation of the allegorical painting known as 'la fisica antica' or the study of the planets, depicting Galileo Galilei. The year of mintage appears in the illustration on a desk underneath a globe. To the left of the image is the mintmark 'R'. The engraver's initials 'LDS' appear on the right hand side. The word 'San Marino' forms a quasi-semicircle along the upper edge of the inner part, while the words 'ANNO MONDIALE DELLA FISICA' run along the lower edge of the inner part. The twelve stars of the European Union are depicted on the outer ring. Between the stars appear parts of a stylised atom which covers the entire coin.
	Finland	60th anniversary of the establishment of the United Nations and 50th anniversary of Finland's UN membership	2 million coins	25 October 2005
The inner part of the coin depicts a dove of peace formed of pieces of a jigsaw puzzle. Underneath the dove, along the edge of the lower half of the inner circle, the words Finland — UN appear on the left and the year of mintage on the right. Above the figure, close to the jigsaw puzzle, there is a letter 'K', the engraver's initial. The MINT mark 'M' appears underneath the representation of the dove of peace. The twelve stars of the European Union are depicted on the outer ring.
	Italy	1st anniversary of the signing of the European Constitution	18 million coins	29 October 2005
The inner part of the coin shows a representation of Europa and the bull. Europa holds a pen and the text of the European Constitution. To the upper left of the image is the mintmark 'R'. The initials of the engraver Maria Carmela Colaneri 'MCC' appear at the lower left. The year of mintage appears in the top right of the illustration above the head of the bull. In the lower part of the illustration there is the monogram of the Italian Republic, 'RI'. The words 'COSTITUZIONE EUROPEA' form a quasi-semicircle on the lower part of the outer ring. Twelve stars are depicted on the upper part of the outer ring.
	Vatican City	20th World Youth Day, held in Cologne in August 2005	100,000 coins	6 December 2005
The inner part of the coin shows a representation of the Cathedral of Cologne with a comet in the upper part of the design. The words XX GIORNATA MONDIALE DELLA GIOVENTU form a quasi-semicircle along the upper edge of the inner part, interrupted by the tail of the comet and one of the church spires. Twelve stars in a quasi-semicircle appear on the upper part of the outer ring. At the top, within the outer ring, the year of mintage (2005) and the mintmark 'R' are inserted between the stars. On the lower part of the outer ring the words 'CITTA' DEL VATICANO' form a semicircle.

=== 2006 coinage ===
Image	Country	Feature	Volume	Date
	Italy	Winter Olympics in Turin 2006	40 million coins	FDI: 10 January 2006; FDC: 10 February 2006
The foreground shows a skier racing, against a background of stylised graphic elements: the monogram of the Italian Republic 'RI' at the top left, below it the letter 'R' and an image of Turin's landmark Mole Antonelliana building with the inscription 'TORINO' below; the words 'GIOCHI INVERNALI' at the top right; to the right of the skier, the year of issue, 2006, written vertically, and the initials of the designer, Maria Carmela Colaneri, MCC. The twelve stars of the European Union encircle the design.
	Luxembourg	25th birthday of Hereditary Grand Duke Guillaume	1,047,500 coins	11 January 2006
The coin depicts on the left-hand side of the inner part the effigy of His Royal Highness, The Grand-Duke Henri looking to the right, superimposed on the effigy of the hereditary Grand-Duke Guillaume, on the right-hand side of the inner part. The date 2006 appears below both effigies, flanked by the letter 'S' and the logo of the Mint. The word 'LËTZEBUERG' appears above the effigies along the upper edge of the inner part of the coin. The 12 stars surround the design on the outer ring of the coin.
	Germany	Holstentor in Lübeck (Schleswig-Holstein); First of the Bundesländer I series	30 million coins	3 February 2006
The inner part of the coin shows a representation of the 'Holstentor', the landmark gate of the town of Lübeck. The word 'Schleswig-Holstein' appears underneath the gate at the bottom of the inner part. The engraver's initials 'HH' are depicted on the right hand side of the design. One of the letters 'A', 'D', 'F', 'G' or 'J' appears as the mintmark on the left hand side of the design. Twelve stars form a semicircle on the upper part of the outer ring, interrupted by the year of mintage '2006' at the top of the coin. The words 'Bundesrepublik Deutschland' form a semicircle on the lower part of the outer ring.
	Belgium	Renovation of the Atomium in Brussels	5 million coins	10 April 2006
The inner part of the coin shows a representation of the 'Atomium'. The engraver's initials 'LL' are depicted to the lower right hand side of the Atomium. Two mintmarks appear along the edge of the inner part, one on the right and one on the left of the lower ball of the Atomium. Twelve stars surround the design on the outer ring. The monogram 'B' appears at the top of the coin between two stars and the year of mintage '2006' appears at the bottom of the circle between two stars.
	Finland	1st Centenary of the Introduction of Universal and Equal Suffrage	2.5 million coins	4 October 2006
The inner part of the coin shows male and female faces separated by a line. On the left side of the coin, is the date 1 October 1906 and on the right side, is the year with the imbedded country abbreviation 20 FI 06. The mint mark 'M' appears at the left of each face. The twelve stars of the European flag are depicted on the outer ring.
	San Marino	500th anniversary of the death of Christopher Columbus	120,000 coins	17 October 2006
Portrait of Christopher Columbus and a representation of the three Caravels; above the portrait the inscription 'SAN MARINO' and the wind rose; in the middle the mint mark 'R'; below, the dates '1506 — 2006' in a cartouche and the initials of the author Luciana De Simoni 'LDS'; on the outer ring, the twelve stars of the European flag surrounding the design.
	Vatican City	500th anniversary of the Swiss Guard	100,000 coins	9 November 2006
The coin features a Swiss guard taking the solemn oath on the Swiss Guard flag. The inscription 'GUARDIA SVIZZERA PONTIFICIA' surrounds the guard, forming a semi-circle which is complemented under the flag by the name of the issuing state 'CITTÁ DEL VATICANO'. The year 1506 appears on the left side, above the signature of the engraver 'O. ROSSI' along the pole of the flag. The year 2006 appears on the upper right side, above the mint mark 'R'. The twelve stars of the European flag are depicted on the outer ring.

=== 2007 coinage ===
Image	Country	Feature	Volume	Date
	Germany	Schwerin Castle (Mecklenburg-Vorpommern); Second of the Bundesländer I series	30 million coins	2 February 2007
The inner part of the coin shows a representation of the Schwerin Castle. The word 'Mecklenburg-Vorpommern 'is inscribed underneath the castle and the engraver's initials 'HH 'appear at the bottom of the inner part of the coin. One of the letters 'A', 'D', 'F', 'G 'or 'J 'appears as the mintmark above the design. Twelve stars form a semicircle on the upper part of the outer ring, interrupted by the year of mintage '2007 'at the top of the coin. The words 'Bundesrepublik Deutschland 'form a semicircle on the lower part of the outer ring.
	Luxembourg	Grand Ducal Palace	1,031,000 coins	2 February 2007
The coin depicts on the right hand of its inner part the effigy of His Royal Highness, the Grand-Duke Henri, looking to the left and superimposed on the picture of the grand-ducal Palace on the left hand side of the inner part. The date 2007 is inscribed on the left side of the inner part, with the engraver's mark above and the mint mark below. The text 'LËTZEBUERG' appears under the design on the inner part of the coin. The twelve stars of the European flag surround the design on the outer ring of the coin.
	Vatican City	80th birthday of Pope Benedict XVI	100,000 coins	FDI: 16 April 2007; FDC: 1 October 2007
The inner part of the coin features a bust of His Holiness Benedictus XVI in profile facing to the left. The legend 'BENEDICTI XVI P.M. AETATIS ANNO LXXX CITTA' DEL VATICANO' is engraved around the portrait. On the left hand side, the mintmark 'R', the issuing year '2007' and the initials of the engraver 'M.C.C. INC.'. On the right hand side, the author's name 'LONGO'. The outer ring of the coin depicts the twelve stars of the European flag.
	Portugal	Portuguese Presidency of the Council of the European Union	2 million coins	FDI: 1 June 2007; FDC: 1 July 2007
The inner part of the coin shows a cork oak (Quercus Suber). Under the branches, on the left hand side, the Portuguese coat of arms; on the right hand side, the word 'POR TU GAL 'written on three lines. The legend '2007 PRESIDÊNCIA DO CONSELHO DA UE 'is inscribed in a semi-circle along the bottom of the inner part, with the artist signature (I Vilar) on the left and the mintmark (INCM) near the Coat of Arms. The outer ring of the coin depicts the twelve stars of the European flag.
	Monaco	25th anniversary of the death of Grace Kelly	20,001 coins	1 July 2007
On the inner part of the coin there is an effigy of Princess Grace in profile facing to the left. 'MONACO', followed by the mint mark, the year '2007' and the engraver's mark, is engraved in an arc in the bottom right of the inner part. The name of the artist (R.B.BARON) is engraved under the Princess's hair. The coin's outer ring depicts the twelve stars of the European flag.
	San Marino	200th birthday of Giuseppe Garibaldi	130,000 coins	9 October 2007
The inner circle of the coin features a portrait of Giuseppe Garibaldi. The inscription 'SAN MARINO' and the year mark '2007' are engraved along the circle on the left and right hand sides respectively. The mint mark 'R' and the initials of the author Ettore Lorenzo Frapiccini 'E.L.F.' appear on the left hand side of the inner circle. The twelve stars of the European flag are depicted on the outer ring.
	Finland	90th anniversary of Finland's independence	2 million coins	1 December 2007
The inner part of the coin shows nine people rowing a boat with long oars. The year mark 2007 and the year 1917 appear on the top and the bottom of the design respectively. The mintmark appears on the left hand side, and the indication of the country 'FI' on the right hand side. The outer ring of the coin depicts the twelve stars of the European flag.

=== 2007 commonly issued coin ===
Image	Country	Feature	Volume	Date
	European Union	50th anniversary of the Signature of the Treaty of Rome.	87,652,666 coins	25 March – 2 April 2007
To celebrate the 50th anniversary of the signing of the Treaty of Rome, Eurogroup Ministers decided that euro-area Member States would strike a 2-euro commemorative coin using a common design on the national side. The selected design is the outcome of a joint preparation by the European Mints. The centre of the coin shows the Treaty signed by the six founding Member States on a background evoking the paving, designed by Michelangelo, of the Piazza del Campidoglio in Rome where the Treaty was signed on 25 March 1957. The translation of the word 'Europe 'appears above the book. The translation of the words 'Treaty of Rome 50 years 'is inscribed above the design. The year 2007 and the national name of the issuing country are inscribed under the design. The twelve stars of the European flag are depicted on the outer ring.
	Austria	50th anniversary of the Signature of the Treaty of Rome	9 million coins	25 March 2007
Inscription: VERTRAG VON ROM 50 JAHRE, EUROPA, 2007, REPUBLIK ÖSTERREICH
	Finland	50th anniversary of the Signature of the Treaty of Rome	1.4 million coins	25 March 2007
Inscription: ROOMAN SOPIMUS 50 V, EUROOPPA, 2007, SUOMI·FINLAND
	Germany	50th anniversary of the Signature of the Treaty of Rome	30,865,630 coins	25 March 2007
Inscription: RÖMISCHE VERTRÄGE 50 JAHRE, EUROPA, 2007, BUNDESREPUBLIK DEUTSCHLAND
	Italy	50th anniversary of the Signature of the Treaty of Rome	5 million coins	25 March 2007
Inscription: TRATTATI DI ROMA 50° ANNIVERSARIO, EUROPA, 2007, REPUBBLICA ITALIANA
	Slovenia	50th anniversary of the Signature of the Treaty of Rome	400,000 coins	25 March 2007
Inscription: RIMSKA POGODBA 50 LET, EVROPA, 2007, SLOVENIJA
	Spain	50th anniversary of the Signature of the Treaty of Rome	8 million coins	25 March 2007
Inscription: TRATADO DE ROMA 50 AÑOS, EUROPA, 2007, ESPAÑA
	Belgium	50th anniversary of the Signature of the Treaty of Rome	5,040,000 coins	26 March 2007
Inscription: PACTVM ROMANVM QVINQVAGENARIVM, $\scriptstyle {\it EUROP}^A_E$, 2007, BELGIQUE–BELGIE–BELGIEN Note: Due to Belgium's special multilingual society, the Belgian coin features the inscription PACTVM ROMANVM QVINQVAGENARIVM in Latin.
	Greece	50th anniversary of the Signature of the Treaty of Rome	3,978,549 coins	26 March 2007
Inscription: ΣΥΝΘΗΚΗ ΤΗΣ ΡΩΜΗΣ 50 XPONIA, EYPΩΠΗ, 2007, ΕΛΛΗΝΙΚΗ ΔΗΜΟΚΡΑΤΙΑ
	Ireland	50th anniversary of the Signature of the Treaty of Rome	4,640,112 coins	26 March 2007
Inscription: CONRADH NA RÓIMHE 50 BLIAIN, AN EORAIP, 2007, ÉIRE Note: The inscription is in Gaelic type.
	Luxembourg	50th anniversary of the Signature of the Treaty of Rome	2,046,000 coins	26 March 2007
Inscription: TRAITÉ DE ROME 50 ANS, EUROPE, 2007, LËTZEBUERG Note: The effigy of His Royal Highness, the Grand-Duke Henri, is superimposed as a latent image on the left hand side of the design.
	Netherlands	50th anniversary of the Signature of the Treaty of Rome	6,355,500 coins	26 March 2022
Inscription: VERDRAG VAN ROME 50 JAAR, EUROPA, 2007, KONINKRIJK DER NEDERLANDEN
	Portugal	50th anniversary of the Signature of the Treaty of Rome	1,520,000 coins	26 March 2007
Inscription: TRATADO DE ROMA 50 ANOS, EUROPA, 2007, PORTUGAL
	France	50th anniversary of the Signature of the Treaty of Rome	9,406,857 coins	2 April 2007
Inscription: TRAITÉ DE ROME 50 ANS, EUROPE, 2007, RÉPUBLIQUE FRANÇAISE

=== 2008 coinage ===
Image	Country	Feature	Volume	Date
	Germany	St. Michaelis Church (Hamburg); Third of the Bundesländer I series	30 million coins	1 February 2008
The inner part of the coin features St Michael's church, Hamburg. The name of the federal State 'HAMBURG' is inscribed beneath the church. To the right of the church are the engraver's initial 'O' and above it towards the top centre the mintmark ('A', 'D', 'F', 'G' or 'J'). The outer ring has the year of issue inscribed at the top, six stars on each side and below them the words 'BUNDESREPUBLIK DEUTSCHLAND'.
	Luxembourg	Berg Castle	1,042,000 coins	2 February 2008
The inner part of the coin shows, on the left-hand side in the foreground, the effigy of His Royal Highness the Grand-Duke Henri looking to the right and, on the right-hand side in the background, the picture of the 'Château de Berg'. The date 2008, flanked by the mint mark and the mark of the engraving workshop, is inscribed on the top. The name of the issuing country 'LËTZEBUERG' appears at the bottom of the design. The outer ring of the coin depicts the twelve stars of the European flag.
	Italy	60th anniversary of the Universal Declaration of Human Rights	5 million coins	April 2008
The inner part of the coin depicts a man and a woman with an olive branch, an ear of corn, a cogwheel and some barbed wire, symbols representing the right to peace, food, work and freedom respectively, along with the links of a chain broken to form the figure '60o'. In the centre of the coin are the initials of the issuing country 'RI'; to the left the year 2008; to the right the initials 'MCC' of the artist Maria Carmela Colaneri and the mint mark 'R'; at the bottom, a cartouche with the inscription 'DIRITTI UMANI'. The outer ring of the coin depicts the twelve stars of the European flag.
	San Marino	European Year of Intercultural Dialogue	130,000 coins	April 2008
The inner part of the coin represents the different cultures of the five regions within the European continent, symbolised by five human silhouettes and the sacred texts of the different communities. Arched inscriptions complete the design: at the top, 'SAN MARINO', above the year '2008'; and at the bottom, 'ANNO EUROPEO DEL DIALOGO INTERCULTURALE' and the initials 'E.L.F.' of the artist, Ettore Lorenzo Frapiccini; to the left, the mint mark 'R'. The coin's outer ring contains the 12 stars of the European flag.
	Belgium	60th anniversary of the Universal Declaration of Human Rights	5 million coins	April / May 2008
The inner part of the coin depicts curved lines around a rectangle marked with the figure 60. The year 2008 is inscribed above the rectangle and the words 'UNIVERSAL DECLARATION OF HUMAN RIGHTS' underneath it. The name of the country is inscribed in a semi-circle below the design in its three official languages. 'BELGIE — BELGIQUE — BELGIEN'. The mintmark and the signature mark of the Master of the Mint appear to the left and right of the design respectively. The outer ring of the coin depicts the twelve stars of the European flag.
	Slovenia	500th birthday of Primož Trubar	1 million coins	May 2008
The inner part of the coin features an effigy of Primož Trubar in left profile. On the left, in two semi-circles, the inscriptions 'PRIMOŽ TRUBAR' and '1508–1586'. Towards the bottom on the right, in semi-circle, the inscription 'SLOVENIJA 2008'. The coin's outer ring contains the 12 stars of the European flag.
	France	French Presidency of the Council of the European Union	20 million coins	July 2008
The inner part of the coin features the following inscription: '2008 PRÉSIDENCE FRANÇAISE UNION EUROPÉENNE RF'. The currency mark and the mintmaster's mark are located below, to the left and the right respectively. The coin's outer ring depicts the 12 stars of the European flag.
	Portugal	60th anniversary of the Universal Declaration of Human Rights	1,025,000 coins	15 September 2008
The inner part of the coin shows the Portuguese coat of arms at the top, above the name of the issuing country ('PORTUGAL'), the year mark '2008' and a geometric design in the bottom half of the centre. The legend '60 ANOS DA DECLARAÇÃO UNIVERSAL DOS DIREITOS HUMANOS' runs along the edge of the bottom two thirds of the inner ring and is followed by the inscription 'Esc. J. Duarte INCM' in very small characters. The outer ring of the coin shows the twelve stars of the European flag.
	Vatican City	2008 – Year of Saint Paul the Apostle	100,000 coins	5 September 2008
The inner part of the coin depicts the conversion of Saint Paul on the road to Damascus (the city is visible in the background); the saint, dazzled by a light from the sky, falls from his rearing horse. Two inscriptions are engraved around the portrait: on the left hand side, an inscription denoting the issuing country 'CITTÀ DEL VATICANO'; on the right hand side, the legend 'ANNO SANCTO PAULO DICATO'. The year '2008' is inscribed to the right of the portrait, as well as the mintmark 'R' and the artist's name 'VEROI'. Beneath the portrait are the initials of the engraver Luciana De Simoni, 'L.D.S. INC.'. The twelve stars of the European flag are depicted on the outer ring.
	Finland	60th anniversary of the Universal Declaration of Human Rights	1.5 million coins	October 2008
The inner part of the coin shows a human figure seen through a heart-shaped hole in a stone wall. The text 'HUMAN RIGHTS' is inscribed under the heart. The year mark '2008' is engraved above the heart. The indication of the issuing country 'FI', the letter 'K' (initial of the artist Tapio Kettunen) and the mintmark appear at the bottom of the design. The outer ring of the coin shows the twelve stars of the European flag.

=== 2009 coinage ===
Image	Country	Feature	Volume	Date
	Luxembourg	90th anniversary of Grand Duchess Charlotte's Accession to the Throne	838,000 coins	1 January 2009
The coin depicts, on the left-hand side of its inner part, the effigy of His Royal Highness, the Grand-Duke Henri superimposed on the effigy of the Grand-Duchess Charlotte, both looking to the left. The vertically aligned text 'LËTZEBUERG' and the year '2009', flanked by the Mintmaster's mark and the mintmark, appear on the right-hand side of the inner part of the coin. The outer ring of the coin shows the twelve stars of the European flag.
	Germany	Ludwigskirche in Saarbrücken (Saarland); Fourth of the Bundesländer I series	30 million coins	2 February 2009
The inner part of the coin depicts the Saint Louis church (Ludwigskirche) in Saarbrücken. The name of the federal State 'SAARLAND' and the mintmark, represented by one of the letters 'A', 'D', 'F', 'G' or 'J', appear under the monument. The initials 'FB' of the engraver Friedrich Brenner are displayed on the right of the monument. The lower part of the outer ring of the coin features the name of the issuing country 'BUNDESREPUBLIK DEUTSCHLAND' and the upper part bears the year '2009' and twelve stars.
	San Marino	European Year of Creativity and Innovation	130,000 coins	May 2009
The inner part of the coin depicts objects representing scientific research: a book, a compass, a test tube and a flask. On the left are the three emblematic feathers of the Republic of San Marino. On the right are the year '2009' and the mint mark 'R'. Above is the legend 'CREATIVITÀ INNOVAZIONE'. Below are the name of the issuing country 'SAN MARINO' and the artist's initials 'A.M.'. The coin's outer ring depicts the 12 stars of the European flag.
	Portugal	2009 Lusophony Games	1,250,000 coins	9 June 2009
The inner part of the coin depicts a gymnast swirling a long ribbon. At the top, the Portuguese coat of arms appears within a semi-circle formed by the name of the issuing country 'PORTUGAL'. In a semi-circle at the bottom the legend '2.os JOGOS DA LUSOFONIA LISBOA' is inscribed between the initials 'INCM' on the left and the artist's name 'J. AURÉLIO' on the right. The year '2009' appears above the gymnast's head, to the left. The coin's outer ring depicts the 12 stars of the European flag, on a background of concentric circular lines.
	Belgium	200th birthday of Louis Braille	5 million coins	25 September 2009
The inner part of the coin features a portrait of Louis Braille between his initials, L and B, in the alphabet that he designed. Above the portrait is the legend 'LOUIS BRAILLE', and underneath is the issuing country reference, 'BE', between the dates 1809 and 2009. To the left and right respectively are the mint mark and the signature mark of the Master of the Mint. The coin's outer ring depicts the 12 stars of the European flag.
	Italy	200th birthday of Louis Braille	2 million coins	15 October 2009
The inner part of the coin depicts a hand reading an open book by touch. Above the index finger, which is pointing at the vertical inscription 'LOUIS BRAILLE 1809–2009', are two birds symbolising freedom of knowledge. The issuing country reference, 'RI', is at the top right, while the mint mark 'R' is at the bottom right. Braille's name is written under the book in the alphabet that he invented. At the very bottom are the initials 'MCC' of the artist Maria Carmela Colanéri. The coin's outer ring depicts the 12 stars of the European flag.
	Slovakia	20th anniversary of the Start of the Velvet Revolution	1 million coins	November 2009
The inner part of the coin depicts a stylised bell made up of a series of keys. This recalls the demonstration on 17 November 1989, when marching citizens shook their bunches of keys to make a jangling sound. This marked the beginning of the Velvet Revolution. To the bottom right of the design are the artist's mark and the mint mark of the Slovak Mint (Mincovňa Kremnica). The design is surrounded above by the legend '17. NOVEMBER SLOBODA — DEMOKRACIA' and the dates '1989–2009' and below by the name of the issuing country, 'SLOVENSKO'. The coin's outer ring depicts the 12 stars of the European flag.
	Vatican City	International Year of Astronomy	106,084 coins	October 2009
The inner part of the coin depicts an allegory of the birth of the stars and planets together with several astronomical instruments. The mint mark 'R' is situated in the bottom left quadrant and the year '2009' is at the bottom. The design is surrounded on the bottom left-hand side by the legend 'ANNO INTERNAZIONALE DELL'ASTRONOMIA' and on the top right-hand side by the name of the issuing country, 'CITTÀ DEL VATICANO'. The coin's outer ring depicts the 12 stars of the European flag.
	Finland	200th anniversary of Finnish Autonomy	1.6 million coins	October 2009
The inner part of the coin depicts the profile of the Porvoo Cathedral, which was the site of opening of the first Diet of Finland. The date 1809 appears on the top. The year mark 2009 is on the right hand side. The indication of the issuing country 'FI' and the mintmark are on the left hand side. The coin's outer ring depicts the twelve stars of the European flag.

=== 2009 commonly issued coin ===
Image	Country	Feature	Volume	Date
	European Union	Ten years of Economic and Monetary Union (EMU) and the birth of the euro	78,675,215 coins	1 January – 26 March 2009
The centre of the coin shows a stylised human figure whose left arm is prolonged by the euro symbol. The initials ΓΣ of the artist appear below the euro symbol. The name(s) of the issuing country in the national language(s) appear(s) at the top, while the indication 1999–2009 and the acronym EMU translated into the national language(s) appear at the bottom. The outer ring depicts the twelve stars of the European flag.
	Ireland	Ten years of Economic and Monetary Union (EMU) and the birth of the euro	5 million coins	1 January 2009
Inscription: ÉIRE, AEA, 1999 – 2009, EMU Note (1): AEA: Aontas Eacnamaíochta Airgeadaíochta, EMU: Economic and Monetary Union Note (2): In the inscription the country's name is in Gaelic type.
	Austria	Ten years of Economic and Monetary Union (EMU) and the birth of the euro	5 million coins	2 January 2009
Inscription: REPUBLIK ÖSTERREICH, WWU, 1999–2009 Note: WWU: Wirtschafts- und Währungsunion
	Germany	Ten years of Economic and Monetary Union (EMU) and the birth of the euro	30,565,630 coins	2 January 2009
Inscription: BUNDESREPUBLIK DEUTSCHLAND, WWU, 1999–2009 Note: WWU: Wirtschafts- und Währungsunion
	Greece	Ten years of Economic and Monetary Union (EMU) and the birth of the euro	4 million coins	2 January 2009
Inscription: ΕΛΛΗΝΙΚΗ ΔΗΜΟΚΡΑΤΙΑ, ΟΝΕ, 1999–2009 Note: ONE: Οικονομική και Νομισματική Ένωση
	Cyprus	Ten years of Economic and Monetary Union (EMU) and the birth of the euro	1 million coins	5 January 2009
Inscription: ΚΥΠΡΟΣ, KIBRIS, ΟΝΕ, 1999 – 2009 Note: ONE: Οικονομική και Νομισματική Ένωση
	Malta	Ten years of Economic and Monetary Union (EMU) and the birth of the euro	700,000 coins	5 January 2009
Inscription: MALTA, UEM, 1999 – 2009 Note: UEM: Unjoni Ekonomika u Monetarja
	Portugal	Ten years of Economic and Monetary Union (EMU) and the birth of the euro	1,285,000 coins	5 January 2009
Inscription: PORTUGAL, UEM, 1999–2009 Note: UEM: União Económica e Monetária
	Slovenia	Ten years of Economic and Monetary Union (EMU) and the birth of the euro	1 million coins	5 January 2009
Inscription: SLOVENIJA, EMU, 1999 – 2009 Note: EMU: Ekonomska in monetarna unija
	Netherlands	Ten years of Economic and Monetary Union (EMU) and the birth of the euro	5,313,500 coins	7 January 2009
Inscription: NEDERLAND, EMU, 1999–2009 Note: EMU: economische en monetaire unie
	Slovakia	Ten years of Economic and Monetary Union (EMU) and the birth of the euro	2.5 million coins	7 January 2009
Inscription: SLOVENSKO, HMÚ, 1999–2009 Note: HMÚ: Hospodárska a menová únia
	Finland	Ten years of Economic and Monetary Union (EMU) and the birth of the euro	1.4 million coins	15 January 2009
Inscription: SUOMI, FINLAND, 2009, EMU, 1999 – 2009 Νote: EMU: Economic and Monetary Union (Talous- ja rahaliitto)
	Luxembourg	Ten years of Economic and Monetary Union (EMU) and the birth of the euro	825,000 coins	15 January 2009
Inscription: LËTZEBUERG, UEM, 1999–2009 Note (1): UEM: l'Union économique et monétaireNote (2): In accordance with the national law, the coin shows an effigy of the Grand Duke as a latent image.
	France	Ten years of Economic and Monetary Union (EMU) and the birth of the euro	10,074,085 coins	23 January 2009
Inscription: RÉPUBLIQUE FRANÇAISE, UEM, 1999–2009 Note: UEM: l'Union économique et monétaire
	Belgium	Ten years of Economic and Monetary Union (EMU) and the birth of the euro	5,012,000 coins	27 January 2009
Inscription: BELGIE – BELGIQUE – BELGIEN, EMU, 1999–2009 Note: EMU: economische en monetaire unie
	Spain	Ten years of Economic and Monetary Union (EMU) and the birth of the euro	8 million coins	2 February 2009
Inscription: ESPAÑA, UEM, 1999–2009 Note: UEM: Unión Económica y Monetaria
	Italy	Ten years of Economic and Monetary Union (EMU) and the birth of the euro	2 million coins	26 March 2009
Inscription: REPUBBLICA ITALIANA, UEM, 1999–2009 Note: UEM: l'unione economica e monetaria
