= Euro gold and silver commemorative coins (Luxembourg) =

Luxembourg Großherzogtum Luxemburg (German) Grand-Duché de Luxembourg (French) Groussherzogtum Lëtzebuerg (Luxembourgish)

This article covers Euro Gold and Silver coins issued by the 'Banque Centrale Du Luxembourg'. It also covers rare cases of collectors coins (coins not planned for normal circulation) minted using other precious metals. This article however, does not cover either the Luxembourg €2 commemorative coins or the Luxembourg Franc commemorative coins.

Other countries' euro Gold and Silver collections can be seen here

== 2002 ==
50 years Court of Justice of the European Communities
Designer: -		Mint: -	
Value: €25	Alloy: Ag	Quantity: 20,000	Quality: Proof
Issued: December 2002	Diameter: 37mm	Weight: 22.85g	Market Value: €60
-

== 2003 ==
5th anniversary of the Banque centrale du Luxembourg
Designer: -		Mint: -	
Value: €5	Alloy: Au	Quantity: 20,000	Quality: Proof
Issued: June 2003	Diameter: 20mm	Weight: 6.22g	Market Value: €120
-

== 2004 ==
The mask of Hellange
Designer: -		Mint: -	
Value: €10	Alloy: Au	Quantity: 5,000	Quality: Proof
Issued: November 2004	Diameter: 16mm	Weight: 3.11g	Market Value: €70
-
25 years Elections to the European Parliament
Designer: -		Mint: -	
Value: €25	Alloy: Ag	Quantity: 10,000	Quality: Proof
Issued: June 2004	Diameter: 37mm	Weight: 22.85g	Market Value: €60
-

== 2005 ==
Council of the European Union and Luxembourg Presidency
Designer: -		Mint: -	
Value: €25	Alloy: Ag	Quantity: 10,000	Quality: Proof
Issued: January 2005	Diameter: 37mm	Weight: 22.85g	Market Value: €60
-

== 2006 ==
The boar from the Titelberg
Designer: -		Mint: -	
Value: €10	Alloy: Au	Quantity: 5,000	Quality: Proof
Issued: October 2006	Diameter: 16mm	Weight: 3.11g	Market Value: €75
-
150 years Banque et Caisse d’Épargne de l’État
Designer: -		Mint: -	
Value: €10	Alloy: Ag & Ti	Quantity: 7,500	Quality: BU
Issued: February 2006	Diameter: 26mm	Weight: 8g	Market Value: €50
-
150 years Council of State
Designer: -		Mint: -	
Value: €20	Alloy: Ag & Ti	Quantity: 4,000	Quality: BU
Issued: November 2006	Diameter: 34mm	Weight: 13.5g	Market Value: €60
-
European Commission
Designer: -		Mint: -	
Value: €25	Alloy: Ag	Quantity: 5,000	Quality: Proof
Issued: January 2006	Diameter: 37mm	Weight: 22.85g	Market Value: €60
-

== 2007 ==
European Court of Auditors 30th anniversary
Designer: -		Mint: -	
Value: €25	Alloy: Ag	Quantity: 3,000	Quality: Proof
Issued: October 2007	Diameter: 37mm	Weight: 22.85g	Market Value: €60
-

== 2008 ==
The Banque centrale du Luxembourg 10th anniversary
Designer: -		Mint: -	
Value: €10	Alloy: Au	Quantity: 5,000	Quality: Proof
Issued: June 2008	Diameter: 23mm	Weight: 10.37g	Market Value: €320
-
The European Investment Bank 50th anniversary
Designer: -		Mint: -	
Value: €25	Alloy: Ag	Quantity: 4,000	Quality: Proof
Issued: January 2008	Diameter: 37mm	Weight: 22.85g	Market Value: €250
-

== 2009 ==
The following is the schedule for next year issues.

Castles of Luxembourg
Designer: -		Mint: Austrian Mint	
Value: €5	Alloy: Ag 925, Nb	Quantity: 7,500	Quality: Proof
Issued: June 2009	Diameter: 34mm	Weight: 16.6g	Market Value: €250
-
