= Euro gold and silver commemorative coins (San Marino) =

Euro commemorative coins in San Marino

San Marino San Marino
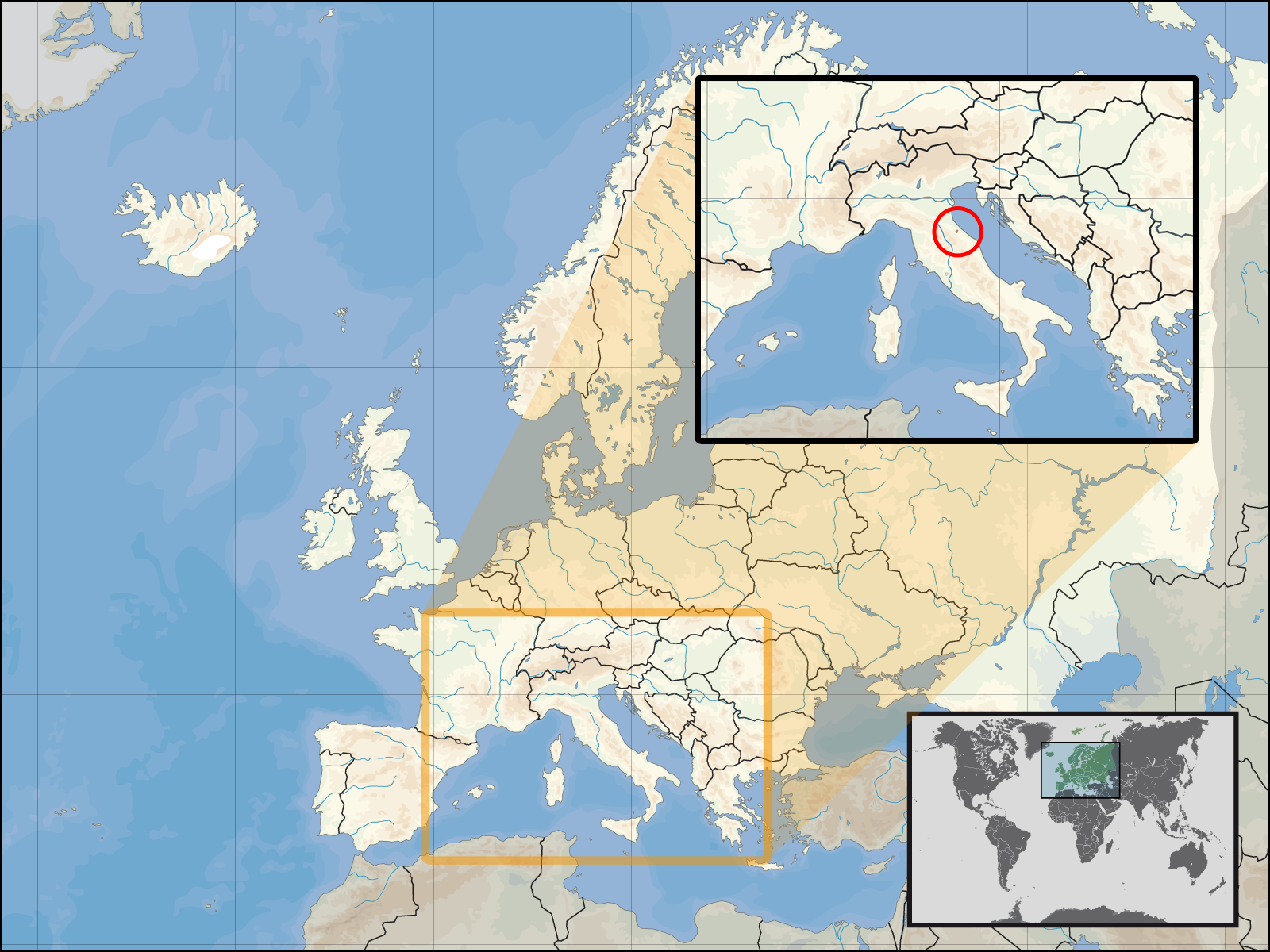

This article covers euro gold and silver commemorative coins issued by Azienda Autonoma Di Stato Filatelica E Numismatica. It also covers rare cases of collectors coins (coins not planned for normal circulation) minted using other precious metals. It does not cover either the San Marino €2 commemorative coins or the other Sammarinese commemorative coins.

For euro gold and silver commemorative coins of other countries see Euro gold and silver commemorative coins.

== Scudo ==
San Marino adopted the euro in 2002 as its currency, However, in the monetary agreement between San Marino and Italy, later renegotiated directly with the European Union, the right of the Republic of San Marino to continue issuing gold coins denominated in scudi is established. These coins will not be legal tender in the European Union.

These coins will be included in this article.

== 2002 coinage ==
Cimabue
Designer: Roberto Mauri & Bino Bini		Mint: -	
Value: 2 scudi	Alloy: Au	Quantity: 3,000	Quality: Proof
Issued: November 2002	Diameter: 21mm	Weight: 6.4516g	Market Value: -
The obverse depicts the coat of arms of the Republic of San Marino The reverse features the art work "Madonna Enthroned with Child-Eight Angels Four Prophets"
1600th Anniversary of the Proclamation of Ravenna as Capital of the Western Roman Empire 402-2002
Designer: L. De Simoni		Mint: -	
Value: €20	Alloy: Au	Quantity: 4,550	Quality: Proof
Issued: November 2002	Diameter: 21 mm	Weight: 6.451g	Market Value: -
The obverse depicts the coat of arms and a crown The reverse features two vine shoots emerge from an ansate vase faced by two peacocks
1600th Anniversary of the Proclamation of Ravenna as Capital of the Western Roman Empire 402-2002
Designer: C. Mo-moni		Mint: -	
Value: €50	Alloy: Au	Quantity: 4,550	Quality: Proof
Issued: November 2002	Diameter: 28 mm	Weight: 18.129g	Market Value: -
The obverse depicts the coat of arms and a crown The reverse features a reproduction of a scene from "the Good Shepherd"
Welcome Euro
Designer: Uliana Pernazza		Mint: -	
Value: €5	Alloy: Ag	Quantity: 37,000	Quality: Proof
Issued: October 2002	Diameter: 32mm	Weight: 18g	Market Value: -
The obverse depicts three towers rising above the three feathers of San Marino The reverse features an inscribed 5 Euro in the centre circumnavigated by twelve roses which represent the twelve countries of the European Union
Welcome Euro
Designer: Uliana Pernazza		Mint: -	
Value: €10	Alloy: Ag	Quantity: 37,000	Quality: Proof
Issued: October 2002	Diameter: 34mm	Weight: 22g	Market Value: -
The obverse depicts three towers rising above the three feathers of San Marino The reverse features a newborn baby curled up fast asleep on a rosebud enveloped in a globe with the inscribed text "Welcome Euro"

== 2003 coinage ==
Nostradamus
Designer: Uliana Pernazza		Mint: -	
Value: 2 scudi	Alloy: Au	Quantity: 7,500	Quality: Proof
Issued: November 2003	Diameter: 21mm	Weight: 6.4516g	Market Value: -
The obverse depicts the coat of arms of the Republic of San Marino The reverse features the profile of Nostradamus
The Scrovegni chapel
Designer: R. Mauri		Mint: -	
Value: €20	Alloy: Au	Quantity: 7,300	Quality: Proof
Issued: 07/11/2003	Diameter: 31mm	Weight: 6.451g	Market Value: -
The obverse depicts the three feathers a symbol of San Marino surmounted by the crown The reverse features an image of Giotto's “Presentation of Jesus at the Temple”
The Scrovegni chapel
Designer: R. Mauri		Mint: -	
Value: €50	Alloy: Au	Quantity: 7,300	Quality: Proof
Issued: 07/11/2003	Diameter: 28mm	Weight: 16.129g	Market Value: -
The obverse depicts the three feathers a symbol of San Marino surmounted by the crown The reverse features an image of Giotto's “The Pentecost”
Olympics
Designer: Colaneri		Mint: -	
Value: €5	Alloy: Ag	Quantity: 37,766	Quality: Proof
Issued: August 2003	Diameter: 32mm	Weight: 18g	Market Value: -
The obverse depicts an interpretation of the coat of arms in a style that represents the Olympics symbols The reverse features the classic games - the Stadion - footrace - disk throwing - throwing the javelin - chariots racing & boxing
Olympics
Designer: Colaneri		Mint: -	
Value: €10	Alloy: Ag	Quantity: 37,766	Quality: Proof
Issued: August 2003	Diameter: 34mm	Weight: 22g	Market Value: -
The obverse depicts an interpretation of the coat of arms in a style that represents the Olympics symbols The reverse features the modern disciplines - fencing - water polo & gymnastics

== 2004 coinage ==
Gothic brooch
Designer: U. Pernazza		Mint: -	
Value: 2 scudi	Alloy: Au	Quantity: 6,500	Quality: Proof
Issued: November 2004	Diameter: 21mm	Weight: 6.4516g	Market Value: -
- The reverse features an image of one of the two paired eagles that represented an opulent ornament of Germanic innovation
750th anniversary of the birth of Marco Polo
Designer: M.C. Colaneri		Mint: -	
Value: €20	Alloy: Au	Quantity: 6,000	Quality: Proof
Issued: November 2004	Diameter: 21mm	Weight: 6.451g	Market Value: -
The obverse depicts the three San Marino feathers in the foreground with the continents visited in his travels by the Messere in the background The reverse features the arrival of Marco Polo and his presentation to the Grand Khan who gives him administrative duties
750th anniversary of the birth of Marco Polo
Designer: M.C. Colaneri		Mint: -	
Value: €50	Alloy: Au	Quantity: 6,000	Quality: Proof
Issued: November 2004	Diameter: 28mm	Weight: 16.129g	Market Value: -
The obverse depicts the three San Marino feathers in the foreground with the continents visited in his travels by the Messere in the background The reverse features Marco Polo with a miniature representing his departure from Venice
World championship football tournament
Designer: L. De Simoni		Mint: -	
Value: €5	Alloy: Ag	Quantity: 30,000	Quality: Proof
Issued: June 2004	Diameter: 32mm	Weight: 18g	Market Value: -
The obverse depicts three towers surmounted by the three plumes of San Marino The reverse features two players in action on a stylized soccer field
World championship football tournament
Designer: L. De Simoni		Mint: -	
Value: €10	Alloy: Ag	Quantity: 30,000	Quality: Proof
Issued: June 2004	Diameter: 34mm	Weight: 22g	Market Value: -
The obverse depicts three towers surmounted by the three plumes of San Marino The reverse features two players in action on a stylized soccer field

== 2005 coinage ==
Rotary international
Designer: Claudia Momoni		Mint: -	
Value: 2 scudi	Alloy: Au	Quantity: 5,500	Quality: Proof
Issued: November 2005	Diameter: 21mm	Weight: 6.4516g	Market Value: -
The obverse depicts the coat of arms of the Republic of San Marino The reverse features a rotar
International Day of Peace
Designer: M.L. Colaneri		Mint: -	
Value: €20	Alloy: Au	Quantity: 5,300	Quality: Proof
Issued: November 2005	Diameter: 21mm	Weight: 6.451g	Market Value: -
The obverse depicts a dove and banner with 3 pumes The obverse depicts three races the European race to indicate the man - the Asiatic race to indicate the woman and the American race to indicate the child
International Day of Peace
Designer: M.L. Colaneri		Mint: -	
Value: €50	Alloy: Au	Quantity: 5,300	Quality: Proof
Issued: November 2005	Diameter: 28mm	Weight: 16.129g	Market Value: -
The obverse depicts a dove and banner with 3 pumes The obverse depicts the 5 continents united for Peace
Torino 2006
Designer: Roberto Mauri		Mint: -	
Value: €5	Alloy: Ag	Quantity: 26,800	Quality: Proof
Issued: July 2005	Diameter: 32mm	Weight: 18g	Market Value: -
The obverse depicts three feathers on three stylized towers surrounded by snowflakes The reverse features a snowman on skis and a large snowflake
Uniformed Militia
Designer: Roberto Mauri		Mint: -	
Value: €10	Alloy: Ag	Quantity: 22,000	Quality: Proof
Issued: June 2005	Diameter: 34mm	Weight: 22g	Market Value: -
The obverse depicts the military coat of arms of the San Marino Forces The reverse features the Standard-bearer
