= Commemorative coins of San Marino =

San Marino is an enclave completely within Italy. With little or no resources, the tiny nation has made income selling stamps and coins to tourists. From 1950 through the adoption of the euro in 1999 (by law, 2002 de facto), legal tender coins with dozens of ever changing designs have been produced in abundance by the Italian mint in Rome. These coins have been for the most part numismatically worthless, except for some silver and gold commemoratives.

San Marino has been allowed the privilege by the European bank to issue euro coins, and since then has issues a number of gold and silver commemoratives as well as circulating 2 euro commemoratives.

- 5 euro – silver – Turin – 2005
- 10 euro – silver – Uniformed Militia – 2005
- 20+50 euro – gold set – The Scrovegni Chapel – 2003

== 2 Euro ==
Bimetallic

- 2004: Bartolomeo Borghesi (historian and numismatist)
- 2005: Galileo Galilei (physicist)
- 2006: Christopher Columbus (explorer)
- 2007: Giuseppe Garibaldi (politician)
- 2008: European Year of Intercultural Dialogue
- 2009: European Year of Creativity and Innovation

== 5 euro in BU set ==
Every year the BU set contains a silver 5 euro coin

== 5 euro ==
In 2002–2009 a separate silver 5 euro has been issued every year.

== 10 euro ==
In 2002–2009 a silver 10 euro has been issued every year.

== 20 euro ==
In 2002–2008 a gold 20 euro has been issued every year.

== 50 euro ==
In 2002–2008 a gold 50 euro has been issued every year.

== See also ==
- €2 commemorative coins
- Euro gold and silver commemorative coins (San Marino)
