= German euro coins =

Designs of German currency

German euro coins have three separate designs for the three series of coins. The 1-cent, 2-cent and 5-cent coins were designed by Rolf Lederbogen, the design for the 10-cent, 20-cent and 50-cent coins were designed by Reinhard Heinsdorff and the 1- and 2-euro coins were done by Heinz Hoyer and Sneschana Russewa-Hoyer. Featured in all designs are the 12 stars of the EU and the year of minting.

In addition to the year, the German coins also feature a small letter as a mint mark indicating the particular mint that minted the coin. Mints that are used for the Euro since Germany adopted it in 2002:

- A: Berlin (1750)
- D: Munich (1871)
- F: Stuttgart (1871)
- G: Karlsruhe (1872)
- J: Hamburg (1875)

The letters were assigned to the mints as they opened. Mints that closed in the 19th century:

- B: Hannover (1866–1878)
- C: Frankfurt am Main (1866–1879)
- E: Dresden/Muldenhütte (1872–1887 as Dresden, continued in Muldenhütte until 1953)
- H: Darmstadt (1872–1882)

Vienna was allocated the letter (B) shortly after the Anschluss of Austria in 1938 and it was in use until 1945. After the post-World War Two division of Germany, Munich (D), Stuttgart (F), Karlsruhe (G) and Hamburg (J) minted coins for the Federal Republic of Germany, while the German Democratic Republic used Berlin (A) and Dresden/Muldenhütte (E) until it closed 1953. Berlin (A) started minting D-Mark coins in 1990 after German Reunification.

== German euro design ==
For images of the common side and a detailed description of the coins, see euro coins.

Depiction of German euro coinage | Obverse side
€0.01	€0.02	€0.05
Oak twig on back of German 1-cent coin	Oak twig on back of German 2-cent coin	Oak twig on back of German 5-cent coin
German oak twig which was also featured on the former pfennig.
€0.10	€0.20	€0.50
Brandenburg Gate on back of German 10-cent coin	Brandenburg Gate on back of German 20-cent coin	Brandenburg Gate on back of German 50-cent coin
The Brandenburg Gate as a symbol of division and unity.
€1.00	€2.00	€2 Coin edge
German Eagle on back of German 1 euro coin	German Eagle on back of German 2 euro coin	The edge lettering features the words "EINIGKEIT UND RECHT UND FREIHEIT" (Unity and Justice and Freedom), Germany's national motto and the incipit of Germany's national anthem.
Interpretation of the Bundesadler, symbol of German sovereignty.		The edge lettering features the words "EINIGKEIT UND RECHT UND FREIHEIT" (Unity and Justice and Freedom), Germany's national motto and the incipit of Germany's national anthem.

== €2 commemorative coins ==
=== German Bundesländer series I ===
Germany started the commemorative coin series Die 16 Bundesländer der Bundesrepublik Deutschland (The 16 States of the Federal Republic of Germany) in 2006, to continue until 2021. The year in which the coin for a specific state is issued coincides with that state's Presidency of the Bundesrat. In 2018, Daniel Günther, the Minister President of Schleswig-Holstein, became the President of the Bundesrat for a one-year term. As a Schleswig-Holstein coin had already been minted in 2006, it was decided to delay the release of the following three states' coins by a year. Instead of honouring a state in 2019, the minted coin commemorates 70 years since the constitution of the German Federal Council or Bundesrat. The last three coins of the series were therefore postponed to 2020, 2021 and 2022, respectively. The coins issued are:

Year	Number	State	Design	Volume
2006	1	Schleswig-Holstein	Holstentor in Lübeck	30 million
2007	2	Mecklenburg-Vorpommern	Schwerin Castle	30 million
2008	3	Hamburg	St. Michael's Church	30 million
2009	4	Saarland	Ludwigskirche in Saarbrücken	30 million
2010	5	Bremen	City Hall and Roland	30 million
2011	6	North Rhine-Westphalia	Cologne Cathedral	30 million
2012	7	Bavaria	Neuschwanstein Castle near Füssen	30 million
2013	8	Baden-Württemberg	Maulbronn Abbey	30 million
2014	9	Lower Saxony	St. Michael's Church in Hildesheim	30 million
2015	10	Hesse	St. Paul's Church in Frankfurt am Main	30 million
2016	11	Saxony	Zwinger Palace in Dresden	30 million
2017	12	Rhineland-Palatinate	Porta Nigra in Trier	
2018	13	Berlin	Charlottenburg Palace	
2020	14	Brandenburg	Sanssouci Palace in Potsdam	
2021	15	Saxony-Anhalt	Magdeburg Cathedral	
2022	16	Thuringia	Wartburg Castle in Eisenach	

The original designs for these states were changed and were as follows:

- 2008 Hamburg: Landungsbrücken
- 2010 Free Hanseatic City of Bremen: Bremen City Hall not including Bremen Roland
- 2012 Bavaria: Munich Frauenkirche
- 2013 Baden-Württemberg Heidelberg Castle
- 2014 Lower Saxony: Hanover New City Hall
- 2015 Hesse: Römer in Frankfurt am Main
- 2018 Berlin: Reichstag
Schwerin Castle in Schwerin (Mecklenburg-Vorpommern) (2007)

City Hall and Roland in Bremen (Free Hanseatic City of Bremen) (2010)

=== German Bundesländer series II ===
Year	Number	State	Design	Volume
2023	1	Hamburg	Elbphilharmonie in Hamburg	
2024	2	Mecklenburg-Vorpommern	Königsstuhl in Jasmund National Park	
2025	3	Saarland	The Great Bend in the Saar at Mettlach	
2026	4	Bremen	Museum of Climatic Zones in Bremerhaven	
2027	5	North Rhine-Westphalia	Aachen Cathedral	
2028	6	Bavaria		
2029	7	Baden-Württemberg		
2030	8	Lower Saxony		
2031	9	Hesse		
2032	10	Saxony		
2033	11	Rhineland-Palatinate		
2034	12	Berlin		
2035	13	Schleswig-Holstein		
2036	14	Brandenburg		
2037	15	Saxony-Anhalt		
2038	16	Thuringia		

=== Unity, Justice and Freedom series ===
In 2025, the German government decided to mint a €2 commemorative coin entitled “35 years of German unity”. The coin marks the start of a series entitled “Einigkeit und Recht und Freiheit” (“Unity and justice and freedom”). As the series continues, one €2 commemorative coin honouring politicians whose actions particularly shaped the history of the Federal Republic of Germany will be issued each year.

Year	Number	Subject	Volume
2025	1	35 years of German unity	
2026	2	150th anniversary of the birth of Konrad Adenauer	

=== Others ===
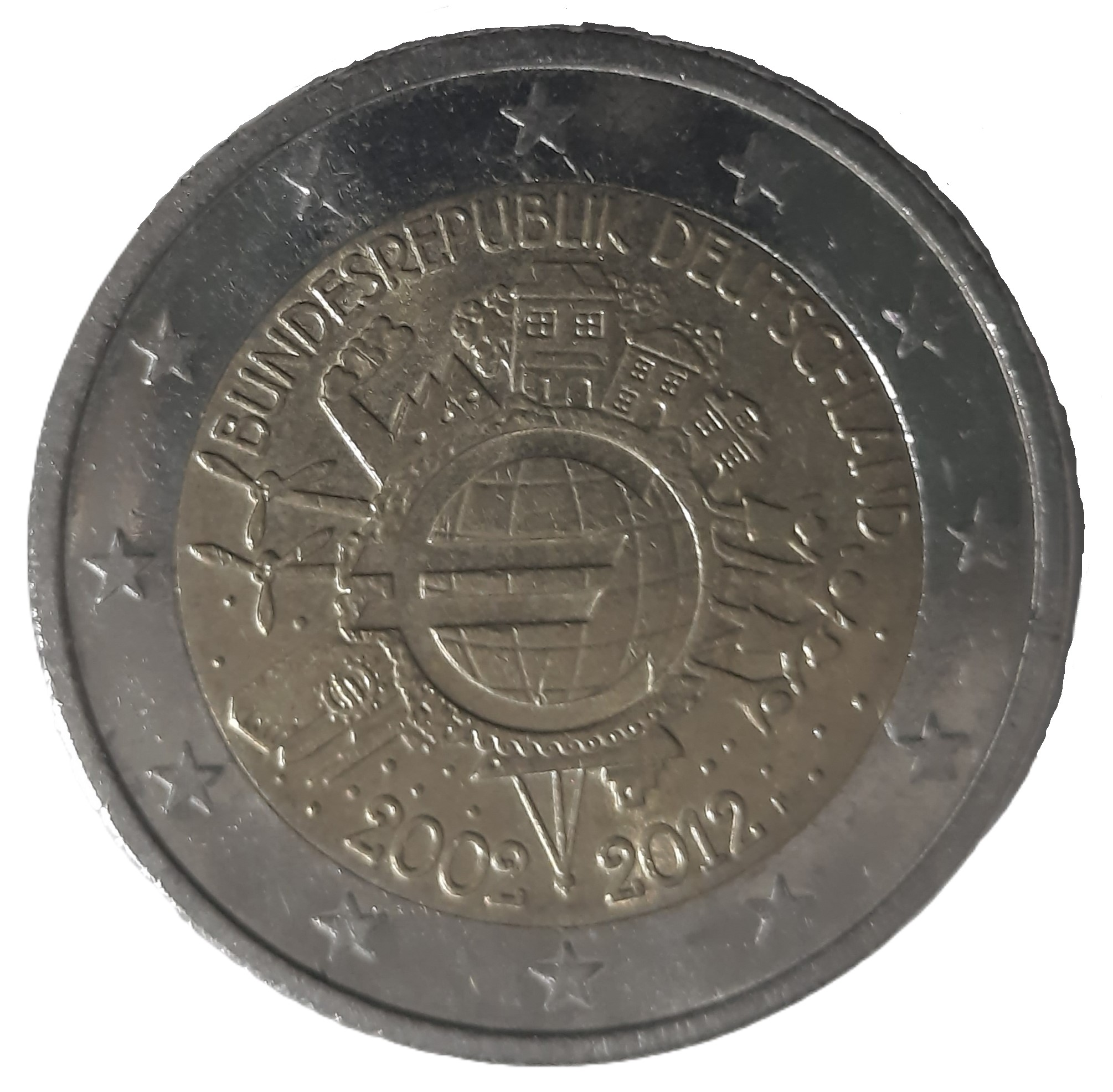
commemorative 2 euro coin of the 10th anniversary of the introduction of the euro, issued in 2012 in Germany

As of 2025, Germany has issued thirteen other €2 commemorative coins in addition to those of the series:

Year	Subject	Volume	Note
2007	50th anniversary of the signing of the Treaty of Rome	30 million	commonly issued coin
2009	10th anniversary of the creation of the European Monetary Union	30 million	commonly issued coin
2012	10th anniversary of the introduction of the euro	30 million	commonly issued coin
2013	50th anniversary of the signing of the Élysée Treaty	11 million	joint issue with France
2015	25th anniversary of the reunification of Germany	30 million	
2015	30th anniversary of the flag of Europe being adopted as the flag of the European Union	30 million	commonly issued coin
2018	100th anniversary of the birth of Helmut Schmidt		
2019	70 years since the constitution of the Federal Council		
2019	30th anniversary of the Fall of the Berlin Wall		joint issue with France
2020	50th anniversary of the Kniefall von Warschau		
2022	35th anniversary of the Erasmus Programme		commonly issued coin
2023	1275th anniversary of the birth of Charlemagne		
2024	175th anniversary of the Constitution of St. Paul's Church		

== Circulating mintage quantities ==
The following table shows the mintage quantity for all German euro coins, per denomination, per year (the numbers are represented in millions).

Face Value	€0.01	€0.02	€0.05	€0.10	€0.20	€0.50	€1.00	€2.00
2002 A	800.0	360.0	480.0	696.1	378.1	337.7	367.9	238.9
2002 D	840.0	483.0	504.0	722.0	367.0	370.2	372.6	238.9
2002 F	960.0	507.8	576.0	838.8	421.6	430.5	439.8	281.1
2002 G	560.0	311.8	336.0	494.3	251.9	256.6	266.4	182.0
2002 J	840.0	419.4	504.0	758.6	441.0	401.4	372.3	257.8
2002 Total	4,840.0	2,501.4	2,904.0	4,268.4	2,300.5	2,156.9	2,186.9	1,448.0

Face Value	€0.01	€0.02	€0.05	€0.10	€0.20	€0.50	€1.00	€2.00
2003 A	s	200.0	s	50.7	41.9	s	50.3	20.5
2003 D	s	105.0	s	50.8	24.1	70.6	s	22.2
2003 F	s	164.2	s	6.0	82.4	s	s	24.5
2003 G	s	80.2	s	13.0	42.1	s	s	29.1
2003 J	s	168.6	s	25.5	s	39.6	29.9	19.5
2003 Total	s	718.0	s	146.0	190.5	110.2	80.2	115.8
s Small quantities minted for sets only

Face Value	€0.01	€0.02	€0.05	€0.10	€0.20	€0.50	€1.00	€2.00
2004 A	280.0	127.0	112.0	s	s	82.3	21.9	31.6
2004 D	294.0	133.4	117.6	11.2	49.8	s	89.3	19.8
2004 F	336.0	152.4	134.4	51.4	s	73.5	88.2	s
2004 G	196.0	88.9	78.4	15.5	s	37.4	41.7	s
2004 J	294.0	133.4	117.6	s	s	s	s	22.5
2004 Total	1,400.0	635.1	560.0	78.1	49.8	193.2	241.1	73.9
s Small quantities minted for sets only

Face Value	€0.01	€0.02	€0.05	€0.10	€0.20	€0.50	€1.00	€2.00
2005 A	120.0	73.0	44.0	s	8.0	s	s	s
2005 D	126.0	76.7	46.2	s	8.4	s	s	s
2005 F	144.0	87.6	52.8	s	9.6	s	s	s
2005 G	84.0	51.1	30.8	s	5.6	s	s	s
2005 J	126.0	76.7	46.2	s	8.4	s	59.8	s
2005 Total	600.0	365.1	220.0	s	40.0	s	59.8	s
s Small quantities minted for sets only

Face Value	€0.01	€0.02	€0.05	€0.10	€0.20	€0.50	€1.00	€2.00	€2.00 CC
2006 A	s	108.0	27.0	s	39.0	s	s	s	6.0
2006 D	s	113.4	28.4	s	41.0	s	s	s	6.3
2006 F	s	129.6	32.4	s	46.8	s	s	s	7.2
2006 G	s	75.6	18.9	s	27.3	s	s	s	4.2
2006 J	s	148.4	28.4	s	41.0	s	s	s	6.3
2006 Total	s	575.0	135.1	s	195.1	s	s	s	30.0
s Small quantities minted for sets only

Face Value	€0.01	€0.02	€0.05	€0.10	€0.20	€0.50	€1.00	€2.00	€2.00 CC1	€2.00 CC2
2007 A	119.4	100.0	52.4	s	21.6	s	s	—N/a	1.04	1.0
2007 D	125.4	105.0	55.0	s	22.7	s	s	—N/a	11.84	14.50
2007 F	143.3	120.0	62.9	s	25.9	s	s	—N/a	11.85	8.00
2007 G	83.6	70.0	36.7	s	15.1	s	s	—N/a	4.2	5.0
2007 J	125.4	105.0	55.0	s	22.9	s	s	—N/a	1.07	1.50
2007 Total	597.1	500.0	262.0	s	108.2	s	s	—N/a	30.0	30.0
— No coins were minted that year for that denomination s Small quantities minted for sets only

Face Value	€0.01	€0.02	€0.05	€0.10	€0.20	€0.50	€1.00	€2.00	€2.00 CC
2008 A	101.2	80.0	29.2	s	15.8	s	s	11.4	1.0
2008 D	106.3	84.0	30.7	s	16.6	s	s	11.99	8.9
2008 F	121.4	96.0	35.0	s	19.0	s	s	13.7	9.6
2008 G	70.8	56.0	20.4	s	11.1	s	s	8.0	4.2
2008 J	106.3	84.0	30.7	s	16.3	s	s	12.0	6.3
2008 Total	506.0	400.0	146.0	s	78.8	s	s	56.9	30.0
s Small quantities minted for sets only

Face Value	€0.01	€0.02	€0.05	€0.10	€0.20	€0.50	€1.00	€2.00	€2.00 CC1	€2.00 CC2
2009 A	100.0	59.0	39.6	s	21.6	s	s	—N/a	6.0	6.0
2009 D	105.0	62.0	41.6	s	22.7	s	s	—N/a	6.3	6.3
2009 F	120.0	70.8	47.5	s	25.9	s	s	—N/a	7.2	7.2
2009 G	70.0	41.3	27.7	s	15.1	s	s	—N/a	4.2	4.2
2009 J	105.0	62.0	41.6	s	22.7	s	s	—N/a	6.3	6.3
2009 Total	500.0	295.1	198.0	s	108.0	s	s	—N/a	30.0	30.0
— No coins were minted that year for that denomination s Small quantities minted for sets only

Face Value	€0.01	€0.02	€0.05	€0.10	€0.20	€0.50	€1.00	€2.00	€2.00 CC
2010 A	94.4	72.8	39.8	s	24.4	s	s	19.6	6.0
2010 D	99.1	76.4	41.8	s	25.6	s	s	20.6	6.3
2010 F	113.3	87.4	47.8	s	29.3	s	s	23.5	7.2
2010 G	66.1	51.0	27.9	s	17.1	s	s	13.7	4.2
2010 J	99.1	76.4	41.8	s	25.6	s	s	20.6	6.3
2010 Total	472.0	364.0	199.1	s	122.0	s	s	98.0	30.0
s Small quantities minted for sets only

Face Value	€0.01	€0.02	€0.05	€0.10	€0.20	€0.50	€1.00	€2.00	€2.00 CC
2011 A	118.4	100.4	59.2	s	33.0	s	s	23.8	6.0
2011 D	124.3	105.4	62.2	s	34.7	s	s	24.98	6.30
2011 F	142.1	120.5	71.0	s	39.6	s	s	27.52	7.2
2011 G	82.9	70.3	41.4	s	23.1	s	s	17.46	4.2
2011 J	124.3	105.4	62.2	s	34.7	s	s	24.98	6.3
2011 Total	592.0	502.0	296.0	s	165.1	s	s	118.9	30.0
s Small quantities minted for sets only

Face Value	€0.01	€0.02	€0.05	€0.10	€0.20	€0.50	€1.00	€2.00	€2.00 CC1	€2.00 CC2
2012 A	104.20	77.40	41.80	s	21.20	s	s	—N/a	6.00	6.00
2012 D	109.41	81.26	43.89	s	22.26	s	s	—N/a	6.30	6.30
2012 F	125.04	92.88	50.16	s	25.44	s	s	—N/a	7.20	7.20
2012 G	72.94	54.18	29.26	s	14.84	s	s	—N/a	4.20	4.20
2012 J	109.41	81.31	43.89	s	22.26	s	s	—N/a	6.30	6.30
2012 Total	521.00	387.00	209.00	s	106.00	s	s	—N/a	30.00	30.00
— No coins were minted that year for that denomination s Small quantities minted for sets only

Face Value	€0.01	€0.02	€0.05	€0.10	€0.20	€0.50	€1.00	€2.00	€2.00 CC1	€2.00 CC2
2013 A	60,00	60,00	32,00	s	16,00	s	s	—N/a	6,00	2.20
2013 D	63.00	63.00	33.60	s	16.80	s	s	—N/a	6.30	2.31
2013 F	72.00	72.00	38.40	s	19.20	s	s	—N/a	7.20	2.64
2013 G	42.00	42.00	22.40	s	11.20	s	s	—N/a	4.20	1.54
2013 J	63.00	63.00	33.60	s	16.80	s	s	—N/a	6.30	2.31
2013 Total	300.00	300.00	160.00	s	80.00	s	s	—N/a	30.00	11.00
— No coins were minted that year for that denomination s Small quantities minted for sets only

Face Value	€0.01	€0.02	€0.05	€0.10	€0.20	€0.50	€1.00	€2.00	€2.00 CC
2014 A	66.00	61.80	32.00	s	19.20	s	s	5.60	6.00
2014 D	69.30	64.89	33.60	s	20.16	s	s	5.88	6.30
2014 F	79.20	74.16	38.40	s	23.04	s	s	6.72	7.20
2014 G	46.20	42.26	22.40	s	13.44	s	s	3.92	4.20
2014 J	69.30	64.89	33.60	s	20.16	s	s	5.88	6.30
2014 Total	330.00	309.00	160.00	s	96.00	s	s	28.00	30.00
s Small quantities minted for sets only

Face Value	€0.01	€0.02	€0.05	€0.10	€0.20	€0.50	€1.00	€2.00	€2.00 CC1	€2.00 CC2	€2.00 CC3
2015 A	86.20	76.00	32.80	s	20.80	s	s	—N/a	6.00	6.00	6.00
2015 D	90.51	79.80	34.44	s	23.94	s	s	—N/a	6.30	6.30	6.30
2015 F	102.44	91.20	39.36	s	27.36	s	s	—N/a	7.20	7.20	7.20
2015 G	60.34	53.20	22.96	s	15.96	s	s	—N/a	4.20	4.20	4.20
2015 J	90.51	79.80	34.44	s	23.94	s	s	—N/a	6.30	6.30	6.30
2015 Total	431.00	380.00	164.00	s	114.00	s	s	—N/a	30.00	30.00	30.00
— No coins were minted that year for that denomination s Small quantities minted for sets only

Face Value	€0.01	€0.02	€0.05	€0.10	€0.20	€0.50	€1.00	€2.00	€2.00 CC
2016 A	116.60	101.40	49.20	s	38.40	s	s	14.20	6.00
2016 D	122.43	106.47	51.66	s	40.32	s	s	14.91	6.30
2016 F	139.92	121.68	59.04	s	46.08	s	s	17.04	7.20
2016 G	81.62	70.98	34.44	s	26.88	s	s	9.94	4.20
2016 J	122.43	106.47	51.66	s	40.32	s	s	14.91	6.30
2016 Total	583.00	507.00	246.00	s	192.00	s	s	71.00	30.00
s Small quantities minted for sets only

== See also ==
- Adoption of the euro in Germany
