= 2 euro commemorative coins =

Commemorative coins of the Eurozone

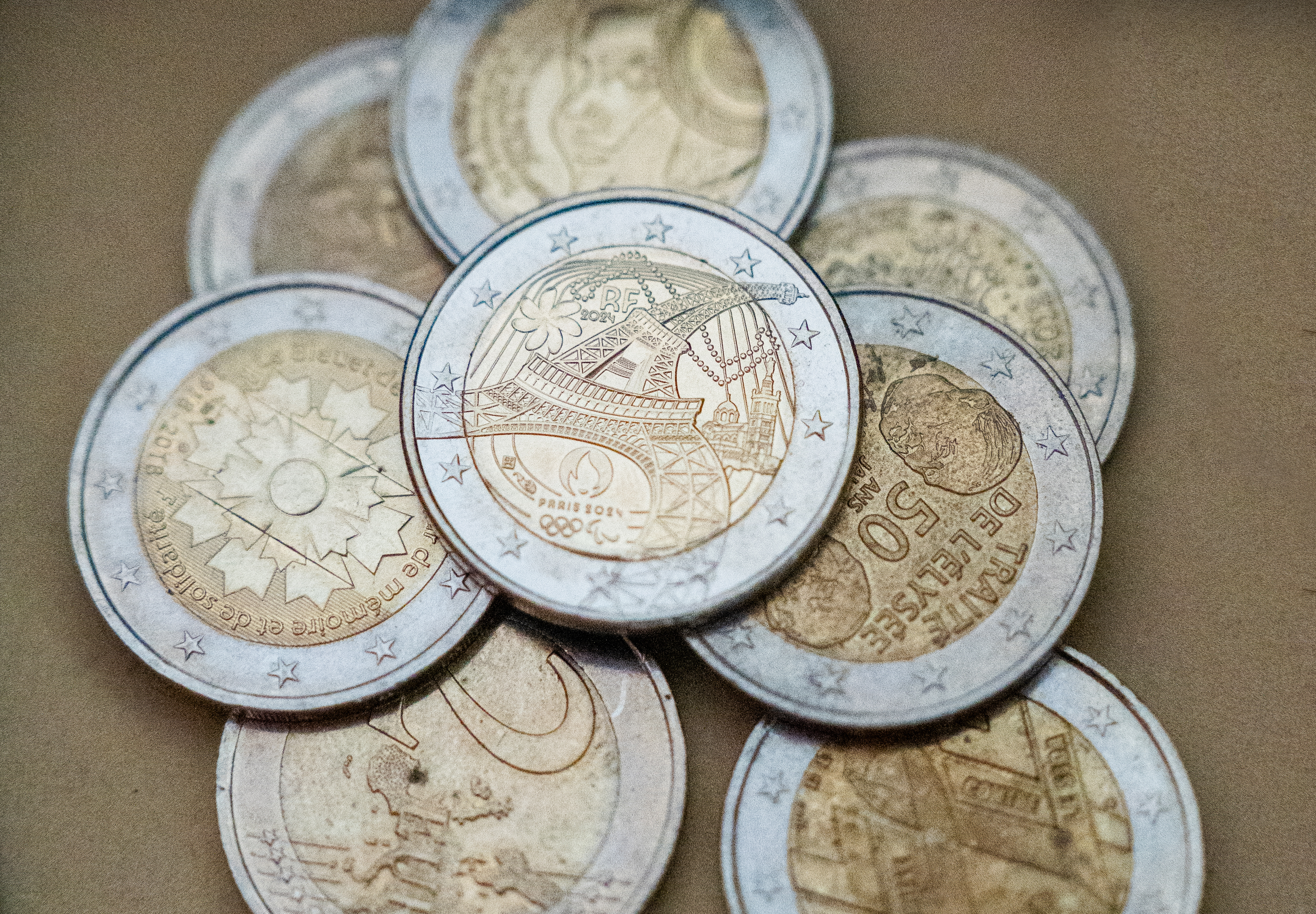
2 euro commemorative coins

€2 commemorative coins are special euro coins that have been minted and issued by member states of the eurozone since 2004 as legal tender in all eurozone member states.

€2 coins are the only denomination intended for circulation that may be issued as commemorative coins. Only the national obverse sides of the commemorative coins differ; the common reverse sides do not. The coins typically commemorate the anniversaries of historical events or current events of special importance.

Since 2012, the number of commemorative coins has been limited to two per country per year; previously only one was allowed. Issues of common commemoratives do not count towards the limit. The total number of commemorative coins placed in circulation per year is also limited. The commemorative coins must follow the design standards stipulated for regular €2 coins, with design limitations to guarantee uniformity.

Up to the end of 2025, 584 variations of €2 commemorative coins have been issued (including three scheduled coins from Vatican City). Finland, Italy, Luxembourg, San Marino and the Vatican City are the only countries to have released at least one commemorative coin every year since 2004.

Though they have become collectibles, €2 commemoratives are different from non-standard denomination commemorative euro coins, which are officially designated as "collector coins", not intended for circulation and usually made of precious metals.

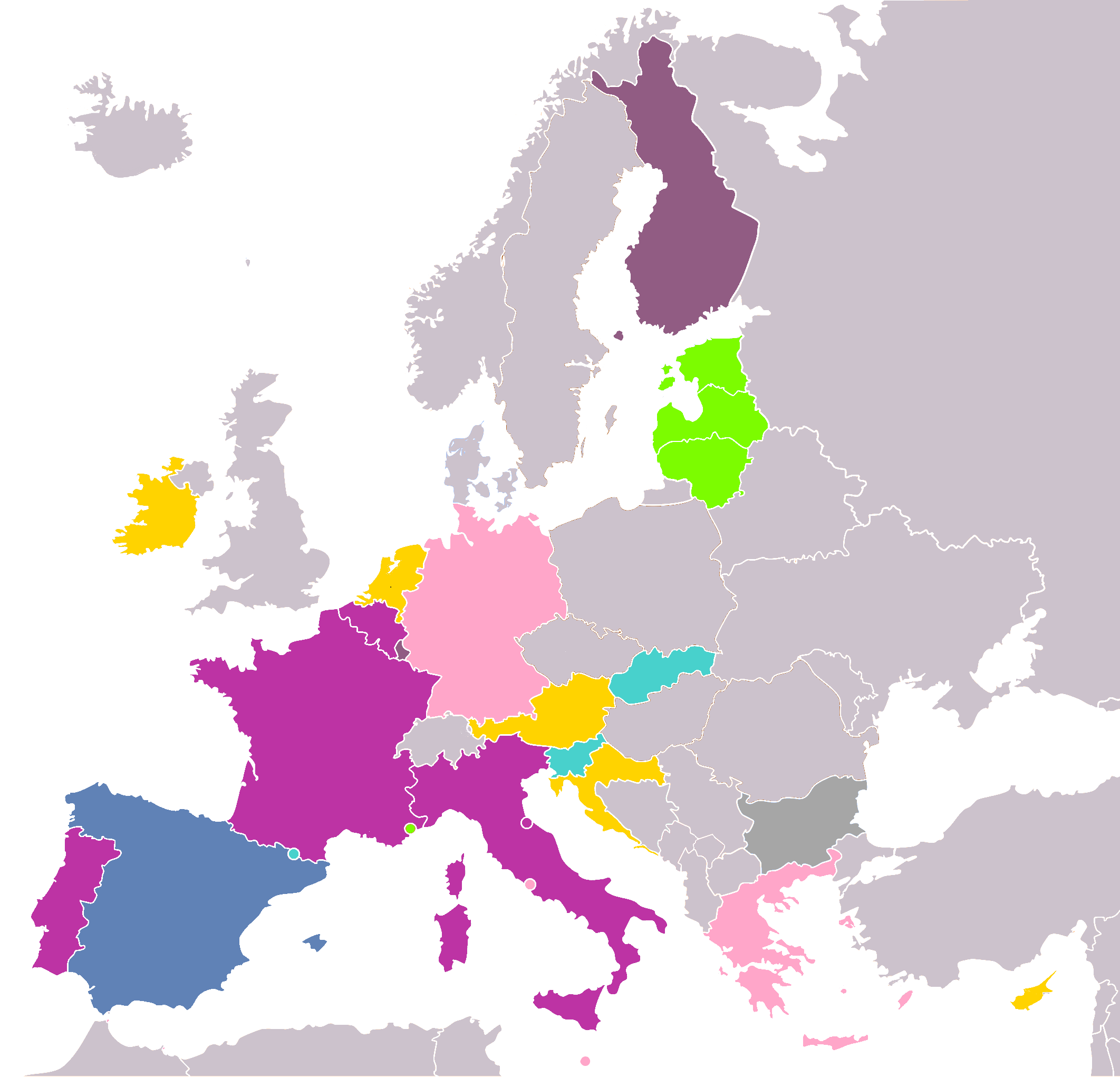
Color-coded map* of eurozone countries by number of €2 commemorative coins issued *State 1 October 2026 46 to 50 coins issued 41 to 45 coins issued 36 to 40 coins issued 31 to 35 coins issued 26 to 30 coins issued 21 to 25 coins issued 16 to 20 coins issued 11 to 15 coins issued 6 to 10 coins issued 1 to 5 coins issued no coins issued not part of the eurozone

== Regulations and restrictions ==
Commemorative coins shall bear a different national design from that of the regular coins and shall only commemorate subjects of major national or European relevance. Commemorative coins issued collectively by all Member States whose currency is the euro shall only commemorate subjects of the highest European relevance and their design shall be without prejudice to the possible constitutional requirements of these Member States. The 2-euro coin constitutes the most suitable denomination for this purpose, principally on account of the large diameter of the coin and its technical characteristics, which offer adequate protection against counterfeiting.

The basis for the euro coins is derived from a European recommendation from 2003, which allowed changing the national obverse sides of euro coins from 1 January 2004 onwards.

Regarding them, a series of restrictions apply:

- Commemorative coins have a different national face than usual and keep the common face.
- They are intended to commemorate some relevant event or personality at a national or European level.
- Each State can only issue one commemorative coin per year and always in the format of 2 euros. Since 2013, two commemorative coins per year are allowed.
- The joint commemorative issues carried out by all the States of the eurozone (that is to say, excluding the euro-issuing States that do not belong to the EU), are additional to the emissions carried out by each State individually.
- In the event that the State Headquarters is vacant or provisionally occupied, that State may issue an additional commemorative coin.
- The legend engraved on the edge of the commemorative euro coins intended for circulation must be the same as that on the normal euro coins intended for circulation.
- They have limited the maximum volume of emission.

The total number of such coins put into circulation per year should not surpass the higher of the following two numbers:

- 0.1% of the total number of €2 coins put into circulation by all members of the eurozone. This limit can exceptionally be increased to up to 2.0 per cent if the coin commemorates a very important and noteworthy event; in this case, the member state issuing this higher number of coins should refrain from putting any commemorative coins into circulation for the following four years.
- 5.0% of the total number of €2 coins put into circulation by the member state issuing the €2 commemorative coin.

Since 2005, the recommendations for the design of the national sides of all the coins have been modified, which has also affected the designs of the €2 commemorative coins of the following years. See euro coins for more information.

The different States must inform each other of the new draft designs (both of the "regular" coins and the 2 euro commemorative coins) as well as the European Council and the European Commission, which must give their approval. One consequence of the above was the case of the 2 euro commemorative coin that Belgium planned to issue in 2015 on the 200th anniversary of the Battle of Waterloo, which caused complaints from France and Belgium's resignation from issuing such a coin. However, Belgium issued a collector's coin of 2.50 euros, taking advantage of the fact that these coins are not submitted to the prior information of their draft designs.

A Dutch law, which requires the portrait of the current head of state of the Netherlands and the words NAME (Koning/Koningin) der Nederlanden to appear on all coins issued by the Netherlands (for example, currently Willem-Alexander Koning der Nederlanden) was amended in 2007, so that the Netherlands could take part in the issuing program of the "50th anniversary of the Treaty of Rome" common €2 commemorative coin, issued by all eurozone member states; the amendment completely removed the requirement for €2 commemorative coins.

== Issues ==
20 members of the eurozone (all except Bulgaria) and four microstates (Andorra, Monaco, San Marino and the Vatican City) have independently issued €2 commemorative coins, with Greece being the first country to do so.

The four microstates which also use the euro due to an official agreement with the European Union, do not issue the common €2 commemorative coins, issued by all the other eurozone members to commemorate events of Europe-wide importance, as they are not member states of the European Union.

There have also been five common €2 commemorative coins issued by all eurozone member states:

- European Union: 50 years since the Treaty of Rome in 2007.
- European Union: 10 years of the Economic and Monetary Union of the European Union in 2009.
- European Union: 10 years of Euro Coins and Banknotes in 2012.
- European Union: 30 years of the Flag of Europe in 2015.
- European Union: 35 years of the Erasmus Programme in 2022.

Three joint issues:

- Germany France: 50th anniversary of the signing of the Élysée Treaty (2013) – two coins.
- Germany France: 30 years since the fall of the Berlin Wall (2019) – two coins.
- Estonia Latvia Lithuania: The 100th anniversary of the foundation of the independent Baltic states (2018) – three coins.

Fifteen coins series with a specific theme:

- Croatia: Croatian Cities (2024–future) – coins representing Croatian cities.
- Estonia: Estonian National Symbols (2021–future) – coins representing national symbols of Estonia.
- France: 2024 Summer Olympics (2021–2024) – one coin per year representing sports at the 2024 Summer Olympics.
- Germany:
  - Bundesländer I (2006–2022) – one coin per year for each of the 16 States of the Federal Republic of Germany.
  - Bundesländer II (2023–2038) – one coin per year for each of the 16 States of the Federal Republic of Germany.
  - Unity, Justice and Freedom (2025–present) – one coin per year representing politicians who have made a significant contribution to the history of the Federal Republic of Germany.
- Latvia: Latvian Historical Regions (2016–2025) – one coin for each of the five Historical Latvian Lands.
- Lithuania:
  - Lithuanian Ethnographical Regions (2019–2025) – one coin for each of the five ethnographic regions of Lithuania.
  - Lithuanian Cities (2026–future) – coins representing Lithuanian cities.
- Luxembourg: Luxembourgish Grand-Ducal Dynasty (2004–future) – coins representing the Grand Ducal Family of Luxembourg.
- Malta:
  - Maltese constitutional history (2011–2015) – one coin per year representing events of the constitutional history of Malta.
  - Maltese Prehistoric Sites (2016–2022) – one coin per year representing the Megalithic Temples of Malta and the Ħal Saflieni Hypogeum.
  - From Children in Solidarity (2016–2020) – one coin per year about the solidarity, with children's designs.
  - Maltese Walled Cities (2024–future) – one coin per year representing Maltese walled cities.
  - Maltese Native Species (2024–future) – one coin per year representing Maltese native species.
- Spain: Spanish UNESCO World Heritage Sites (2010–future) – one coin per year representing Spain's UNESCO World Heritage Sites.

Country	Issues	2004	2005	2006	2007		2008	2009		2010	2011	2012		2013	2014	2015		2016	2017	2018	2019	2020	2021	2022		2023	2024	2025	2026	2027
Country	Issues	2004	2005	2006	reg.	ToR	2008	reg.	EMU	2010	2011	reg.	10Y€	2013	2014	reg.	30YF	2016	2017	2018	2019	2020	2021	reg.	ErPr	2023	2024	2025	2026	2027
Andorra	23														Y	Y/Y		Y/Y	Y/Y	Y/Y	Y/Y	Y/Y	Y/Y	Y/Y		Y/Y	Y/Y	Y/Y	S/S	
Austria	8		Y			Y			Y				Y				Y	Y		Y					Y					S
Belgium	37		Y	Y		Y	Y	Y	Y	Y	Y	Y	Y	Y	Y/Y	Y	Y	Y/Y	Y/Y	Y/Y	Y/Y	Y/Y	Y/Y	Y	Y	Y/Y	Y/Y	Y/Y	Y/Y	
Bulgaria	0																												S	
Croatia	6																									Y	Y/Y	Y/Y	Y/S	
Cyprus	9								Y				Y				Y		Y			Y			Y	Y	Y		Y	
Estonia	19												Y				Y	Y	Y	Y/Y	Y/Y	Y/Y	Y/Y	Y/Y	Y	Y	Y	Y	Y	S/S
Finland	41	Y	Y	Y	Y	Y	Y	Y	Y	Y	Y	Y	Y	Y/Y	Y/Y	Y/Y	Y	Y/Y	Y/Y	Y/Y	Y	Y/Y	Y/Y	Y/Y	Y	Y/Y	Y/Y	Y/Y	Y/Y	
France	37					Y	Y		Y	Y	Y	Y	Y	Y/Y	Y/Y	Y/Y	Y	Y/Y	Y/Y	Y/Y	Y/Y	Y/Y	Y/Y	Y/Y	Y	Y/Y	Y/Y	Y/Y	Y/Y	
Germany	35			Y	Y	Y	Y	Y	Y	Y	Y	Y	Y	Y/Y	Y	Y/Y	Y	Y	Y	Y/Y	Y/Y	Y/Y	Y	Y	Y	Y/Y	Y/Y	Y/Y	Y/Y	S/S
Greece	33	Y				Y			Y	Y	Y		Y	Y/Y	Y/Y	Y	Y	Y/Y	Y/Y	Y/Y	Y/Y	Y/Y	Y	Y	Y	Y/Y	Y/Y	Y/Y	Y/Y	
Ireland	10					Y			Y				Y				Y	Y			Y				Y	Y			Y/Y	
Italy	40	Y	Y	Y		Y	Y	Y	Y	Y	Y	Y	Y	Y/Y	Y/Y	Y/Y	Y	Y/Y	Y/Y	Y/Y	Y	Y/Y	Y/Y	Y/Y	Y	Y/Y	Y/Y	Y/Y	Y/Y	
Latvia	18														Y	Y/Y	Y	Y/Y	Y/Y	Y/Y	Y	Y	Y	Y	Y	Y	Y	Y	S	
Lithuania	21															Y	Y	Y	Y	Y/Y	Y/Y	Y/Y	Y/Y	Y/Y	Y	Y	Y	Y/Y	Y/Y	S/S
Luxembourg	41	Y	Y	Y	Y	Y	Y	Y	Y	Y	Y	Y/Y	Y	Y	Y/Y	Y/Y	Y	Y	Y/Y	Y/Y	Y/Y	Y/Y	Y/Y	Y/Y	Y	Y/Y	Y/Y	Y/Y	Y/Y	
Malta	33								Y		Y	Y	Y	Y	Y/Y	Y/Y	Y	Y/Y	Y/Y	Y/Y	Y/Y	Y/Y	Y/Y	Y/Y	Y	Y/Y	Y/Y	Y/Y	Y/Y	
Monaco	17				Y						Y	Y		Y		Y		Y	Y	Y	Y	Y	Y	Y		Y	Y	Y/Y	Y	
Netherlands	9					Y			Y		Y		Y	Y/Y	Y		Y								Y					
Portugal	37				Y	Y	Y	Y	Y	Y	Y	Y	Y	Y	Y/Y	Y/Y	Y	Y/Y	Y/Y	Y/Y	Y/Y	Y/Y	Y/Y	Y	Y	Y/Y	Y/Y	Y/Y	Y/Y	
San Marino	36	Y	Y	Y	Y		Y	Y		Y	Y	Y		Y	Y/Y	Y/Y		Y/Y	Y/Y	Y/Y	Y/Y	Y/Y	Y/Y	Y/Y		Y/Y	Y/Y	Y/Y	Y/Y	
Slovakia	22							Y	Y		Y		Y	Y	Y	Y	Y	Y	Y	Y	Y	Y	Y	Y	Y	Y/Y	Y	Y	Y/Y	S/S
Slovenia	22					Y	Y		Y	Y	Y		Y	Y	Y	Y	Y	Y	Y	Y	Y	Y	Y	Y	Y	Y	Y	Y	Y	S
Spain	29		Y			Y			Y	Y	Y	Y	Y	Y	Y/Y	Y	Y	Y	Y	Y/Y	Y	Y	Y	Y/Y	Y	Y/Y	Y/Y	Y	Y/Y	S
Vatican City	34	Y	Y	Y	Y		Y	Y		Y	Y	Y		Y/Y	Y	Y		Y/Y	Y/Y	Y/Y	Y/Y	Y/Y	Y/Y	Y/Y		Υ/Y	Y/Y	Y/Y/Y	S/S	
Total	617	6	8	7	7	13	10	9	16	12	16	13	17	23	27	28	19	32	32	36	32	34	31	30	19	36	35	36	33(7)	
Y – yes / was either not yet part of the eurozone or authorized to mint euro coins (Andorra since 1 April 2012); no / S – scheduled

Issued designs are made public in the Official Journal of the European Union. Although the volume and issue date of the coins are listed in the official journal, the actual figures sometimes deviate considerably from those published.
