= Euro gold and silver commemorative coins =

Collectors' euro coins

Eurozone participation European Union member states (special territories not shown) 21 in the eurozone 1 in ERM II, with an opt-out (Denmark) 5 not in ERM II, but committed to join the eurozone after meeting the convergence criteria (Czech Republic, Hungary, Poland, Romania, and Sweden) Non–EU member states 4 using the euro with a monetary agreement (Andorra, Monaco, San Marino, and Vatican City) 2 using the euro unilaterally (Kosovo and Montenegro)

Gold and silver issues of the euro commemorative coins are collectors' euro coins not primarily intended for general circulation; the commemoratives also include rare cases of bimetal collector coins, such as titanium and niobium.

== Introduction ==
Eurozone member states have longstanding national practices of minting silver and gold commemorative coins. Unlike normal issues, these coins are not legal tender in the entire eurozone, only in the country where the coin was issued. This means that one is free to accept these coins as payment only in the country of issue, or to settle debt there, and even then only under specific circumstances.

Though these coins are not really intended to be used as means of payment, their bullion value generally vastly exceeds their face value so it does not constitute a significant problem. In Germany, silver €10 commemoratives are available at banks and some retailers at face value, but the coins do not generally circulate.

It is uncertain whether the EU Council of Ministers will grant the coins legal tender status outside national boundaries, as San Marino, Monaco and Vatican City also issue these kinds of coins.

=== Europa Coin Programme ===
The Europa coin programme is an initiative in which EU countries issue collector-oriented euro and other denomination precious metal coins designed according to a particular yearly theme.

=== Eurozone gold and silver commemorative issue summary ===
Country	Issues	By year											By metal		
Country	Issues	2002	2003	2004	2005	2006	2007	2008	2009	2010	2011	2012	Gold	Silver	Other
Austria	152	11	12	14	13	13	13	15	15	16	14	16	64	79	9
Belgium	56	2	2	4	4	6	6	7	6	7	7	5	27	29	
Cyprus	4							1		2		1	1	3	
Estonia	4										3	1	2	2	
Finland	92	3	4	3	4	5	4	4	7	13	25	20	11	75	6
France	403	28	60	42	42	51	65	50	63	2			204	194	5
Germany	105	7	7	7	7	6	6	6	7	8	23	21	31	74	
Greece	51		15	12	1	3	4	1	2	2	5	6	13	38	
Ireland	27		2	1	1	2	3	4	3	3	3	5	9	17	1
Italy	101		6	8	15	10	10	9	12	9	12	10	18	62	1
Lithuania	4												1	2	1
Luxembourg	23	1	1	2	1	4	1	2	1	5	3	2	19	71	1
Malta	10							2	2	2	2	2	5	5	
Monaco	9	1	2	1	1			2			1	1	4	5	
Netherlands	53	2	5	4	5	6	2	2	2	6	9	10	22	30	
Portugal	104		9	10	6	7	7	11	10	16	13	15	25	58	21
San Marino	54	4	5	5	5	5	5	5	5	5	5	5	22	32	
Slovakia	27								4	5	9	9	3	26	
Slovenia	29							5	5	5	7	7	10	16	3
Spain	222	15	11	18	13	11	18	15	15	29	37	41	40	177	3
Vatican City	50	4	4	4	5	4	4	5	4	4	5	7	26	24	
Total	1555	26	58	56	42	48	45	60	46	52	34	5	164	266	40

Country	Issues	By face value																				
Country	Issues	€100,000	€500	€400	€300	€250	€200	€100	€50	€30	€25	€20	€15	€12.5	€12	€10	€8	€5	€3	€2.50	€1.50	€0.25
Austria	136	1						20	20		19	21				30		22			4	
Belgium	31							6	4		1	2		3		13		2				
Cyprus	3											1						2				
Estonia	2											1				1						
Finland	27							4	2			1				14		6				
France	338		1			1		28	18			84	2			60		16			104	25
Germany	61						1	9				1				50						
Greece	36						1	8				1				26						
Ireland	27							1				8	6			11		2				
Lithuania	4											1						2				
Malta	8								4							4						
Monaco	7							1				2				2		2				
Netherlands	28								2			3				13		10				
Portugal	50															7	17	13		8	2	3
Slovakia	2											1				1						
Slovenia	15							6		6									3			
Spain	108			6	2		16	2	10		2	2			8	57		2	1			
Total	?	?	?	?	?	?	?	?	?	?	?	?	?	?	?	?	?	?	?	?	?	?

== Austria ==
Location of Austria

Austria introduced euro coins in 2002 alongside the general issuance of euros in the eurozone. From the very beginning, they have been minting a fairly large set of collectors' coins. The record was reached in 2004, when 14 different coins were minted. There was a unique and particular edition of a very special coin: the €100,000 Vienna Philharmonic, only 15 coins minted.

Austria uses mainly gold and silver for its collectors' coins. However, since 2003 a special bimetal coin, €25 face value, has been minted using silver and colored niobium, giving this set of coins a unique characteristic, since they have different color variations every year.

With the exception of the 2004 Vienna Philharmonic coin and the recently introduced 2008 silver €1.25 Vienna Philharmonic, there is no variation in the number of issues when sorted by face value, from €5 to €100 there is a similar number of issues every year.

=== Vienna Philharmonic coin ===
A unique piece in the Austrian collection is the Vienna Philharmonic coin. This coin is struck in pure gold, 999.9 fine (24 carats). It is issued every year, in four different face values, sizes and weights. It is used as an investment product (bullion coin), although it finishes almost always in hands of collectors. According to the World Gold Council, it was the best selling gold coin in 1992, 1995 and 1996 worldwide.

Since 1 February 2008, this coin is being minted in silver as well. Both sides of the coin feature the same as on the Vienna Philharmonic pure gold coin. Its face value of 1.50 euros gives the silver piece its coin character, but is not relevant for the actual market value of the coin.

=== 2008 Europe taler ===
Once again Austria made a major milestone in numismatics: the launch of the largest silver coin in the world has been made by Hall in Tirol. It was revealed on the occasion of the 2008 European Championship of Football in Austria and Switzerland. The front side design of the coin is as old as five centuries. 500 years ago in Trient, Kaiser Maximilian I crowned himself Emperor and a propaganda coin was issued by the mint in Hall. On the coin was written: "King of all the lands in Europe". This inscription included the word "Europe" for the first time. The obverse corresponds to that from the time of Maximilian in 1508. It shows the emperor mounted in armour on a horse. This massive coin has a diameter of 360 mm and a weight of 20.08 kg.

A smaller version for collectors will also be minted and will be sold at €108.

=== Summary ===
Year	Issues	By metal			By face value										
Year	Issues	Gold	Silver	Others	€100,000	€2,000	€100	€50	€25	€20	€10	€5	€4	€3	€1.50
2002	12	6	5	1	–	-	2	2	2	2	3	1	-	-	–
2003	12	6	5	1	–	-	2	2	2	2	3	1	-	-	–
2004	14	7	6	1	1	-	2	2	2	2	3	2	-	-	–
2005	13	6	6	1	–	-	2	2	2	2	3	2	-	-	–
2006	13	6	6	1	–	-	2	2	2	2	3	2	-	-	–
2007	13	6	6	1	–	-	2	2	2	2	3	2	-	-	1
2008	15	6	8	1	–	-	2	2	2	2	3	3	-	-	1
2009	15	7	7	1	–	1	2	2	2	2	3	2	-	-	1
2010	15	6	8	1	–	-	2	2	2	3	3	3	-	-	1
2011	15	6	8	1	–	-	2	2	2	3	3	2	-	-	1
2012	19	6	8	5	–	-	2	2	2	3	5	4	-	-	1
2013	19	6	8	5	–	-	2	2	2	3	5	4	-	-	1
2014	20	7	8	5	–	-	2	2	2	3	5	4	1	-	1
2015	20	7	8	5	–	-	2	2	2	3	5	4	1	-	1
2016	22	7	8	7	–	-	3	2	2	3	5	4	1	1	1
2017	26	7	8	11	–	-	3	2	2	3	5	4	2	4	1
2018	26	7	8	11	–	-	3	2	2	3	5	4	2	4	1
2019	26	7	8	11	–	-	3	2	2	3	5	4	2	4	1
2020	26	7	8	11	–	-	3	2	2	3	5	4	2	4	1
2021	26	7	8	11	–	-	3	2	2	3	5	4	2	4	1
2022	28	7	9	12	–	-	3	2	2	3	5	6	2	4	1
2023	26	7	8	11	–	-	3	2	2	3	5	4	2	4	1
2024	28	7	9	12	–	-	3	2	2	3	5	6	4	4	1
Coins were minted / No coins were minted / Scheduled to be minted

== Belgium ==
Kingdom of Belgium (in Dutch) Koninkrijk België (in French) Royaume de Belgique (in German) Königreich Belgien
- ISO 3166 code: BE

Belgium joined the eurozone in 2002 and has been minting collectors' coins since. In the first two years, there were not many coins minted, only two issues per year. Since 2004, a gradual increase has taken place, with a record of six coins minted in 2006 and 2007.

With the exception of Belgian €2 commemorative coins and normal Belgian euro coins, which are intended for circulation, only one coin has been minted by the Royal Belgian Mint using materials other than gold and silver. This coin, the 2006 "50th anniversary of the catastrophe Bois du Cazier at Marcinelle", is a silver coin with a portrait embossed in copper. It is also the only bimetal commemorative coin minted so far; all other collectors' coins have been minted completely in either silver or gold, they have not used any other materials, and they have not minted any other bimetal coins.

Belgium mints collectors' coins issues in very low quantities; some of the coins disappear from the market a few weeks after release. Typically, the majority of the coins have a face value of €10 or €100. In recent years, coins with face value €12.50, €20, €250 and €50 have also been minted.

=== Summary ===
Year	Issues	By metal			By face value						
Year	Issues	gold	silver	Others	€100	€50	€25	€20	€12.5	€10	€5
2002	2	1	1	–	1	–	–	–	–	1	–
2003	2	1	1	–	1	–	–	–	–	1	–
2004	4	2	2	–	1	1	–	–	–	2	–
2005	4	1	3	–	1	–	–	1	–	2	–
2006	5	3	2	–	1	1	–	–	1	3	–
2007	6	3	3	–	1	1	–	1	1	2	–
2008	7	4	3	–	1	1	1	–	1	2	1
2009	6	3	3	–	1	1	–	1	1	2	–
2010	7	3	4	–	1	1	–	1	1	2	1
2011	7	4	3	–	1	2	–	-	1	2	1
2012	5	3	2	–	1	1	–	1	1	2	0
2013	7	3	4	–	1	1	–	1	1	2	1
2014	7	3	4	–	1	1	–	1	1	2	1
2015	9	5	4	–	1	1	1	–	2	2	2
2016	9	4	5	–	1	1	1	1	1	2	2
2017	9	3	6	–	1	-	1	2	1	2	2
2018	8	4	4	–	1	1	1	1	1	2	1
2019	6	3	3	–	-	1	1	–	1	2	1
2020	7	2	3	2	–	1	–	1	1	1	3
2021	9	3	3	3	–	1	1	1	1	1	4
2022	4	1	2	1	–	–	–	1	1	1	1
2023	4	1	2	1	–	–	–	1	1	1	1
2024	3	1	2	1	–	–	–	1	1	1	1
Total	137	61	69	7	17	17	7	15	20	39	22
Coins were minted No coins were minted Scheduled to be minted

== Cyprus ==
Republic of Cyprus Κυπριακή Δημοκρατία (Greek) Kypriakī́ Dīmokratía Kıbrıs Cumhuriyeti (Turkish)
- ISO 3166 code: CY

As of 20 October 2008, one Cypriot euro commemorative coin had been minted. This special high-value commemorative coin is not to be confused with €2 commemorative coins, which are coins designated for circulation and do have legal tender status in all countries of the eurozone.

=== Summary ===
The following table shows the number of coins minted per year. In the first section, the coins are grouped by the metal used, while in the second section they are grouped by their face value.

Year	Issues	By metal			By face value	
Year	Issues	gold	silver	Others	€20	€5
2008	1	–	1	–	-	1
2009	0	-	-	–	-	-
2010	2	1	1	–	1	1
2011	0	-	-	–	-	-
2012	1	-	1	–	-	1
2013	2	1	1	–	1	1
2014	1	-	1	-	-	1
2015	1	-	1	-	-	1
2016	1	-	1	-	-	1
2017	1	-	1	-	-	1
2018	1	-	1	-	-	1
2019	1	-	1	-	-	1
2020	1	-	1	-	-	1
2021	2	1	1	–	1	1
2022	1	-	1	-	-	1
2023	1	-	1	-	-	1
2024	1	-	1	–	-	1
Total	18	3	15	–	3	15
Coins were minted No coins were minted Scheduled to be minted

== Estonia ==
Republic of Estonia Eesti Vabariik

=== Summary ===
Year	Issues	By metal			By face value	
Year	Issues	gold	silver	Others	€20	€10
2011	2	1	1	–	1	1
Total	2	1	1	0	1	1
Coins were minted / No coins were minted

== Finland ==
Republic of Finland (in Finnish) Suomen tasavalta (in Swedish) Republiken Finland
- ISO 3166 code: FI

Finland joined the eurozone in 2002, and they continued their tradition of minting collectors' coins. They do not mint many coins per year; only three or four coins. The record was reached in 2005 with five coins minted.

Finland, unlike other EU countries, tends to use mainly silver in their collectors' coin issues and has a very distinctive way of alternating other materials, like gold, nickel-copper and Nordic gold. The country has minted more bimetal collectors' coins than gold coins. This is the main reason why the vast majority of the Finnish coins have a low face value, with almost 70% of their issues having a face value of €5 or €10. As a result, the Finnish gold coins hold very high market value because they are fairly difficult to find.

=== Summary ===
Year	Issues	By metal			By face value				
Year	Issues	gold	silver	Others	€100	€50	€20	€10	€5
2002	3	1	2	–	1	–	–	2	–
2003	4	1	2	1	–	1	–	2	1
2004	3	1	2	–	1	–	–	2	–
2005	4	1	2	1	–	–	1	2	1
2006	5	1	2	2	–	1	–	2	2
2007	4	1	2	1	1	–	–	2	1
2008	4	1	2	1	1	–	–	2	1
2009	1	–	1	–	–	–	–	1	–
Total	28	7	15	6	4	2	1	15	6
Coins were minted / No coins were minted

== France ==
France France

=== Summary ===
Year	Issues	By metal			By face value								
Year	Issues	gold	silver	others	€500	€100	€50	€20	€15	€10	€5	€1.50	€0.25
2002	28	14	12	2	–	2	1	10	–	1	1	8	5
2003	60	33	26	1	–	4	3	22	–	5	1	22	3
2004	42	22	19	1	1	4	2	13	–	3	2	14	3
2005	42	22	19	1	–	6	2	7	–	10	1	14	2
2006	51	24	27	–	–	6	3	11	–	12	1	13	5
2007	65	30	35	–	–	2	5	14	1	15	4	19	5
2008	50	25	25	–	–	4	2	7	1	14	6	14	2
Total	338	170	163	5	1	28	18	84	2	60	16	104	25

== Germany ==
Federal Republic of Germany Bundesrepublik Deutschland

Year	Issues	By metal			By face value			
Year	Issues	gold	silver	others	€200	€100	€20	€10
2002	7	2	5	–	1	1	-	5
2003	7	1	6	–	–	1	-	6
2004	7	1	6	–	–	1	-	6
2005	7	1	6	–	–	1	-	6
2006	6	1	5	–	–	1	-	5
2007	6	1	5	–	–	1	-	5
2008	6	1	5	–	–	1	-	5
2009	7	1	6	–	–	1	-	6
2010	8	2	6	–	–	1	1	6
Total	61	11	50	–	1	9	1	50

== Greece ==
Hellenic Republic Ελληνική Δημοκρατία Ellīnikī́ Dīmokratía

Greece minted a high number of collectors' coins in 2003 and 2004, in both gold and silver, as part of the celebration of the 2004 Athens Olympic Games. After that just a few coins were minted, solely in silver. As of 9 December 2008, 36 variations of Greek commemorative coins had been minted: 15 in 2003, 12 in 2004, one in 2005, three in 2006, four in 2007 and one in 2008.

=== Summary ===
The following table shows the number of coins minted per year. In the first section, the coins are grouped by the metal used, while in the second section they are grouped by their face value.

Year	Issues	By metal			By face value							
Year	Issues	gold	silver	Others	€200	€100	€50	€20	€10	€6	€5	€1,5
2003	15	5	10	–	1	4	–	1	9	–	–	–
2004	12	4	8	–	–	4	–	–	8	–	–	–
2005	1	–	1	–	–	–	–	–	1	–	–	–
2006	3	–	3	–	–	–	–	–	3	–	–	–
2007	4	–	4	–	–	–	–	–	4	–	–	–
2008	1	–	1	–	–	–	–	–	1	–	–	–
2009	2	–	2	–	–	–	–	–	2	–	–	–
2010	1	–	1	–	–	–	–	–	1	–	–	–
2011	1	–	1	–	–	–	–	–	1	–	–	–
2012	6	3	3	–	2	–	1	–	3	–	–	–
2013	6	2	4	–	1	–	1	–	3	–	1	–
2014	7	3	4	–	1	1	1	–	3	–	–	–
2015	7	3	3	1	1	1	1	–	2	1	1	–
2016	7	3	3	1	1	1	1	–	2	1	1	–
2017	8	3	4	1	1	1	1	–	3	1	1	–
2018	13	3	10	-	1	1	1	–	3	7	-	–
2019	9	3	4	2	1	1	1	–	3	1	2	–
2020	11	3	8	-	1	1	1	–	2	2	4	–
2021	5	2	3	-	-	1	1	–	1	-	2	–
2022	10	3	7	-	1	1	1	–	3	-	4	–
2023	11	3	8	-	1	1	1	–	3	3	2	–
2024	14	3	10	1	1	1	1	-	5	2	1	1
Total	154	46	102	6	14	20	12	1	66	18	20	1
Coins were minted No coins were minted Scheduled to be minted

== Ireland ==
Ireland Éire

Ireland joined the eurozone in 2002, however it did not mint any collectors' coins until 2003. Ireland has kept its issues to the very minimum with one or two coins per year. The record was reached in 2008, when four coins where issued.

The vast majority of the Irish coins are made of silver, only since 2006 have Irish euro collectors' coins been seen in gold. In 2003, a very special coin was issued, the only one with a face value of €5 minted so far, and the only one made of two colors (not to be confused with bimetal coins), using alloys of other materials. This coin was issued commemorating the 2003 Special Olympics World Summer Games hosted in Ireland; it was the biggest mint ever with 60,000 coins released.

In general, Ireland mints coins with very low face values, but because of the rarity of their gold coins, they are quoted in the market at very high values.

=== Summary ===
Year	Issues	By metal			By face value					
Year	Issues	gold	silver	Others	€100	€50	€20	€15	€10	€5
2002	0	–	–	–	–	–	–	–	–	–
2003	2	–	1	1	–	–	–	–	1	1
2004	1	–	1	–	–	–	–	–	1	–
2005	1	–	1	–	–	–	–	–	1	–
2006	2	1	1	–	–	–	1	–	1	–
2007	3	1	2	–	–	–	1	1	1	–
2008	4	2	2	–	1	–	1	–	1	1
2009	3	1	2	–	–	–	1	1	1	–
2010	3	1	2	–	–	–	1	1	1	–
2011	3	1	2	–	–	–	1	1	1	–
2012	5	2	3	–	–	–	2	1	2	–
2013	2	–	2	–	–	–	–	1	1	–
2014	3	1	2	–	–	–	1	1	1	–
2015	3	–	3	–	–	–	–	2	1	–
2016	4	2	2	–	1	1	–	1	1	–
2017	3	–	3	–	–	–	–	2	1	–
2018	3	–	3	–	–	–	–	3	–	–
2019	3	1	2	–	1	–	–	2	–	–
2020	2	–	2	–	–	–	1	1	–	–
2021	0	–	2	–	–	–	1	1	–	–
2022	2	1	1	–	1	–	-	1	–	–
2023	1	–	1	–	–	–	-	1	–	–
2024	1	–	1	–	–	–	-	1	–	–
Total	55	15	39	1	4	1	10	21	17	2
Coins were minted / No coins were minted

== Italy ==
Italy Italy

=== Summary ===
Year	Issues	By metal			By face value			
Year	Issues	gold	silver	others	€50	€20	€10	€5
2002	0	–	–	–	–	–	–	–
2003	6	2	4	–	1	1	2	2
2004	8	3	5	–	1	2	2	3
2005	15	6	9	–	2	4	5	4
2006	10	4	6	–	2	2	4	2
2007	10	3	7	–	1	2	3	4
2008	9	3	6	–	1	2	2	4
2010	8	2	6	–	1	1	3	3
Total	66	23	43	-	9	14	21	22

== Luxembourg ==
Luxembourg Luxembourg

In 2006, Luxembourg made two bimetallic coins of silver and titanium. In 2009, another 2 bimetallic coins were issued, one of which was made of silver and niobium, and the other one in silver and brass.

=== Summary ===
Year	Issues	By metal			By face value			
Year	Issues	gold	silver	others	€25	€20	€10	€5
2002	1	–	1	–	1	–	–	–
2003	1	1	–	–	–	–	–	1
2004	2	1	1	–	1	–	1	–
2005	1	–	1	–	1	–	–	–
2006	4	1	1	2	1	1	2	–
2007	1	–	1	–	1	–	–	–
2008	2	1	1	–	1	–	1	–
2009	1	-	-	2	-	-	-	2
Total	13	4	6	4	6	1	4	3

== Malta ==
Republic of Malta Repubblika ta' Malta
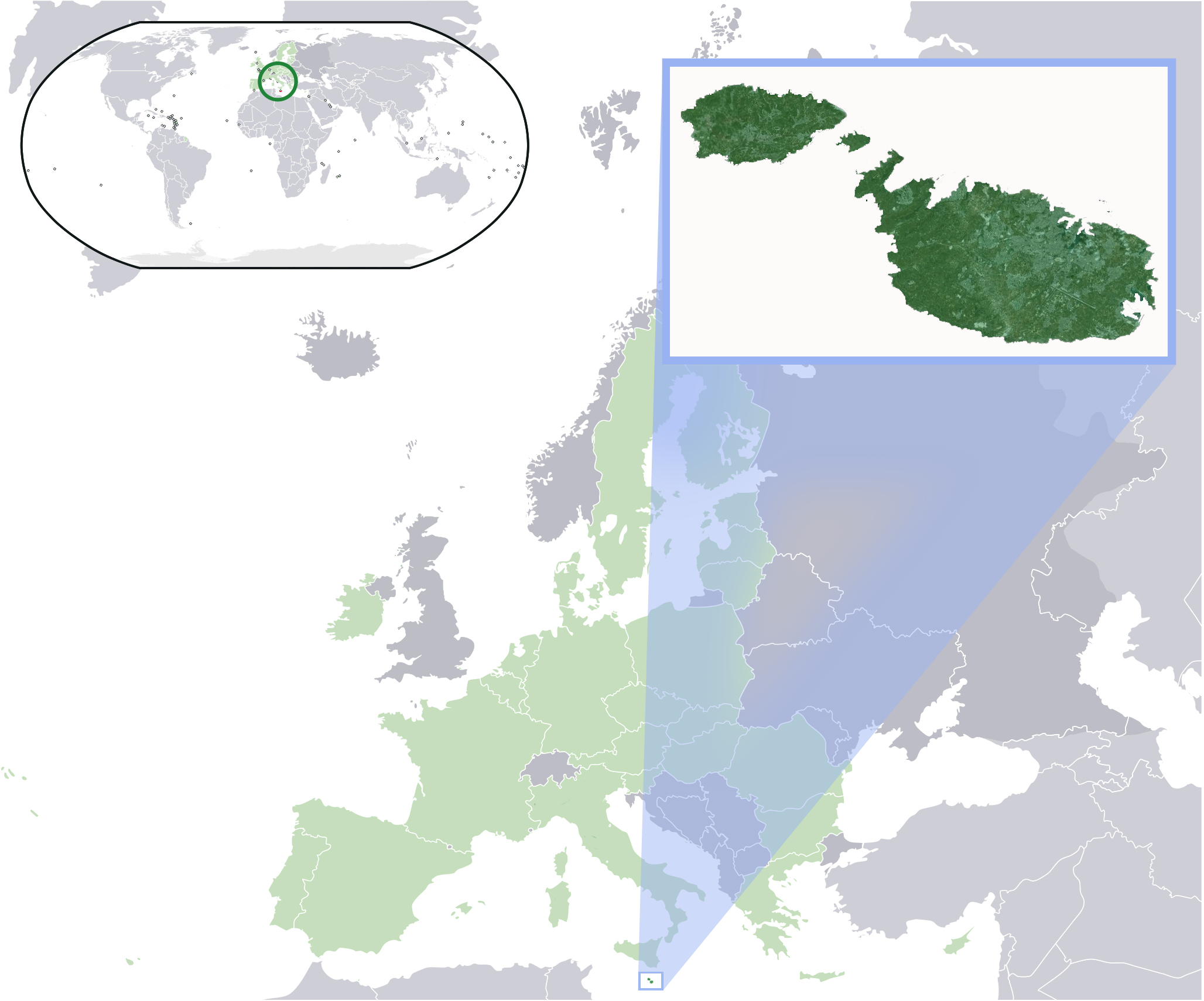
- ISO 3166 code: MT

Malta joined the eurozone on 1 January 2008. It has issued several gold coins denominated €5, €15, €50 and €100, several silver coins denominated €10, one brass coin denominated €5, and one cupro-nickel coin denominated €5. From 2008 to 2012, there were only two issues per year, but the number has increased since 2013.

In addition, Melita bullion coins struck in gold with denominations of €25, €50 and €100 have been issued since 30 November 2018. Since they are not commemorative coins, they are not included in the summary below.

=== Summary ===
Year	Issues	By metal			By face value				
Year	Issues	gold	silver	others	€100	€50	€15	€10	€5
2008	2	1	1	–	–	1	–	1	–
2009	2	1	1	–	–	1	–	1	–
2010	2	1	1	–	–	1	–	1	–
2011	2	1	1	–	–	1	–	1	–
2012	2	1	1	–	–	1	–	1	–
2013	7	3	4	–	–	1	1	4	1
2014	9	3	5	1	–	1	1	5	2
2015	8	4	4	–	–	1	1	4	2
2016	5	2	3	–	–	1	–	3	1
2017	5	1	4	–	–	1	–	4	–
2018	6	2	3	1	1	1	–	3	1
2019	4	1	3	–	–	1	–	3	–
2020	3	1	2	–	–	1	–	2	–
Total	57	22	33	2	1	13	3	33	7

== Monaco ==
Principality of Monaco Principauté de Monaco
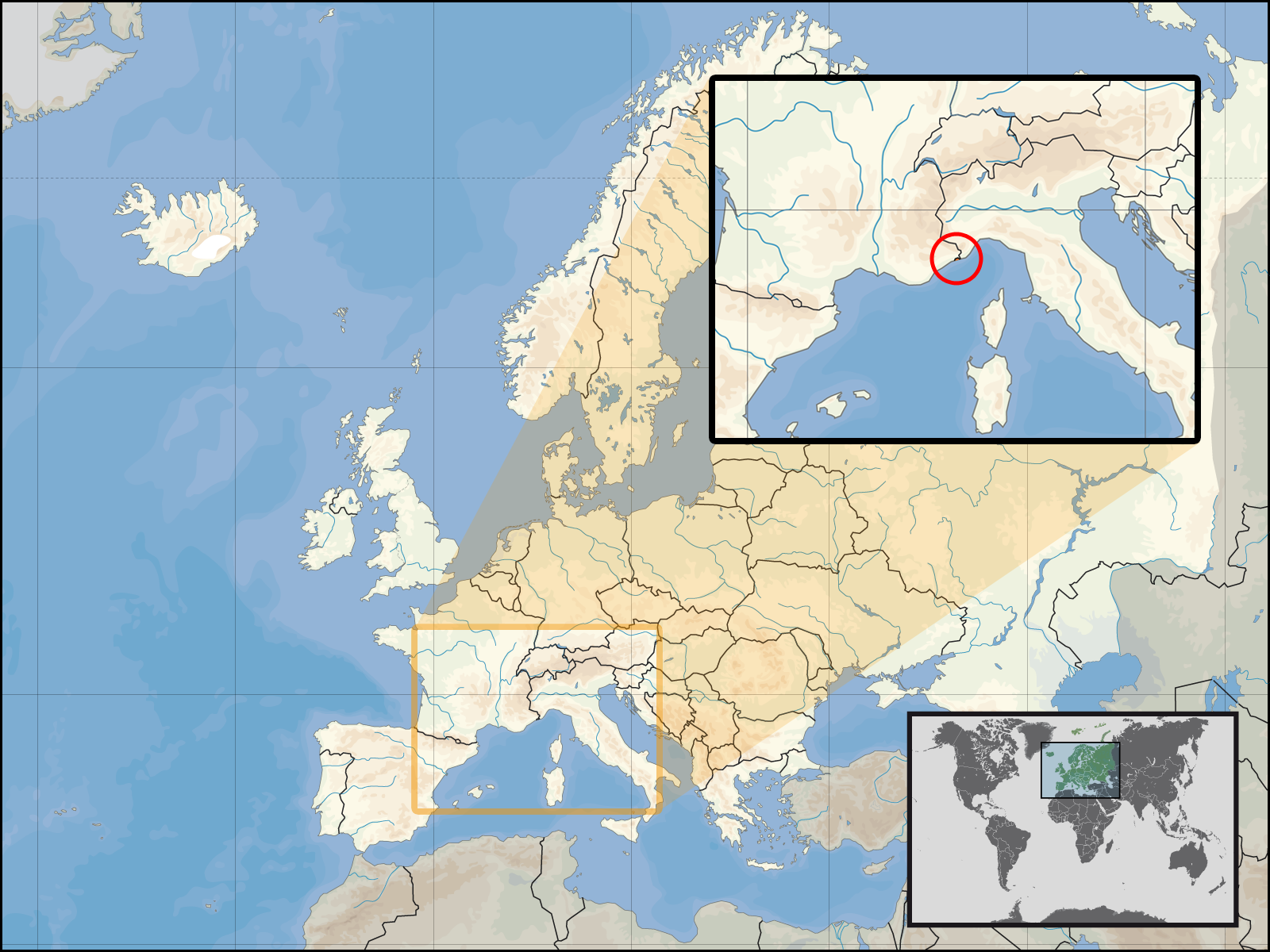
- ISO 3166 code: MC

As of 28 December 2008, seven varieties of Monegasque euro commemorative coins have been minted: one in 2002, two in 2003, one in 2004, one in 2005 and two in 2008. These special high-value commemorative coins are not to be confused with €2 commemorative coins, which are coins designated for circulation and do have legal tender status in all countries of the eurozone.

The following table shows the number of coins minted per year. In the first section, the coins are grouped by the metal used, while in the second section they are grouped by their face value.

=== Summary ===
Year	Issues	By metal			By face value			
Year	Issues	gold	silver	Others	€100	€20	€10	€5
2002	1	1	–	–	–	1	–	–
2003	2	1	1	–	1	–	1	–
2004	1	–	1	–	–	–	–	1
2005	1	1	–	–	–	–	1	–
2006	0	–	–	–	–	–	–	–
2007	0	–	–	–	–	–	–	–
2008	2	1	1	–	–	1	–	1
Total	7	4	3	0	1	2	2	2
Coins were minted / No coins were minted

== Netherlands ==
Netherlands Nederland

The Netherlands joined the eurozone in 2002, and it continued its tradition of minting collectors' coins. It does not mint many coins per year; the average is two silver and two gold coins per year. The record was reached in 2006 with six coins minted.

Some issues are also minted in Netherlands Antillean guilder and in Aruban florin. These commemorative coins have the same subject, but a different design. They are also minted in gold and silver versions.

=== Summary ===
Year	Issues	By metal			By face value			
Year	Issues	gold	silver	others	€50	€20	€10	€5
2002	2	1	1	–	–	1	1	–
2003	5	3	2	–	1	1	2	1
2004	4	2	2	–	–	–	2	2
2005	5	3	2	–	1	1	2	1
2006	6	3	3	–	–	–	3	3
2007	2	1	1	–	–	–	1	1
2008	2	1	1	–	–	–	1	1
2009	4	2	2	–	–	–	2	2
Total	30	16	14	–	2	3	14	11

== Portugal ==
=== Summary ===
Year	Issues	By metal			By face value						
Year	Issues	gold	silver	others	€10	€8	7,50	€5	€2.50	€1.50	€0.25
2002	0	–	–	–	–	–	–	–	–	–	–
2003	9	4	5	–	1	6	–	2	–	–	–
2004	10	3	7	–	1	7	–	2	–	–	–
2005	6	1	5	–	1	1	–	4	–	–	–
2006	7	1	6	–	2	2	–	2	–	–	1
2007	7	1	6	–	2	1	–	3	–	–	1
2008	11	1	5	5	–	–	–	–	8	2	1
2009	10	3	3	4	–	–	–	–	7	2	1
2010	16	3	6	7	2	–	–	2	9	2	1
2011	13	4	4	5	2	–	2	–	7	–	2
Total	89	21	47	21	11	17	2	15	31	6	7

== San Marino ==
San Marino San Marino
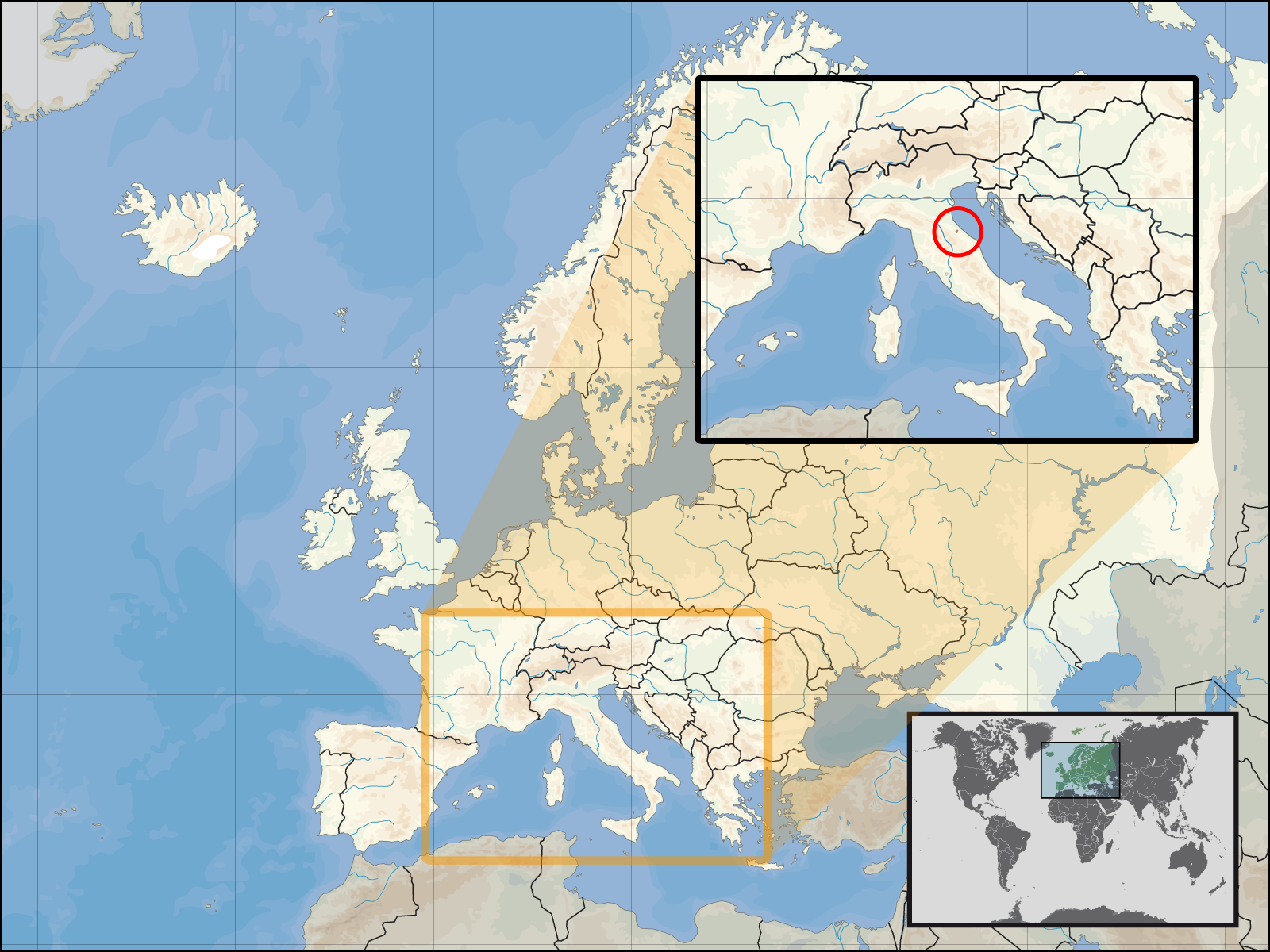

=== Summary ===
Year	Issues	By metal			By face value			
Year	Issues	gold	silver	others	€50	€20	€10	€5
2002	4	2	2	–	1	1	1	1
2003	5	2	3	–	1	1	1	2
2004	5	2	3	–	1	1	1	2
2005	5	2	3	–	1	1	1	2
2006	5	2	3	–	1	1	1	2
2007	5	2	3	–	1	1	1	2
2008	5	2	3	–	1	1	1	2
2009	3	-	3	–	-	-	1	2
Total	37	14	23	–	7	7	8	15

== Slovakia ==
Slovakia Slovensko
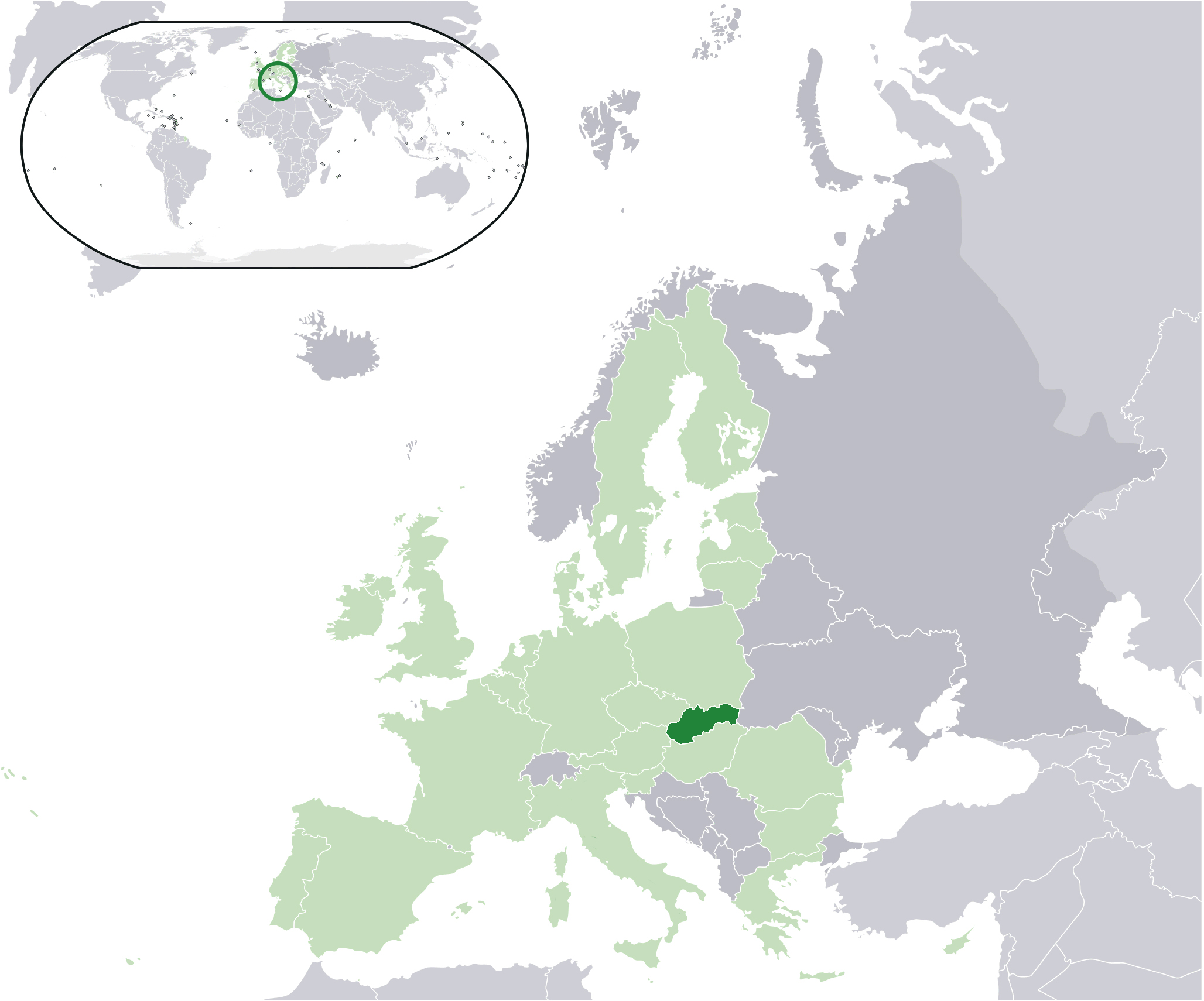

=== Summary ===
Slovakia joined the eurozone on 1 January 2009 and had two varieties of commemorative coins scheduled to be minted that year. These special high-value commemorative coins are not to be confused with €2 commemorative coins, which are intended for circulation and have legal tender status in all eurozone countries. The coins were intended to be made of silver, with face values of 10 and 20 euros.

Year	Issues	By metal			By face value	
Year	Issues	gold	silver	others	€20	€10
2009	2	–	2	–	1	1
Total	2	0	2	0	1	1
Coins will be minted / No coins were minted

== Slovenia ==
Republic of Slovenia Republika Slovenija
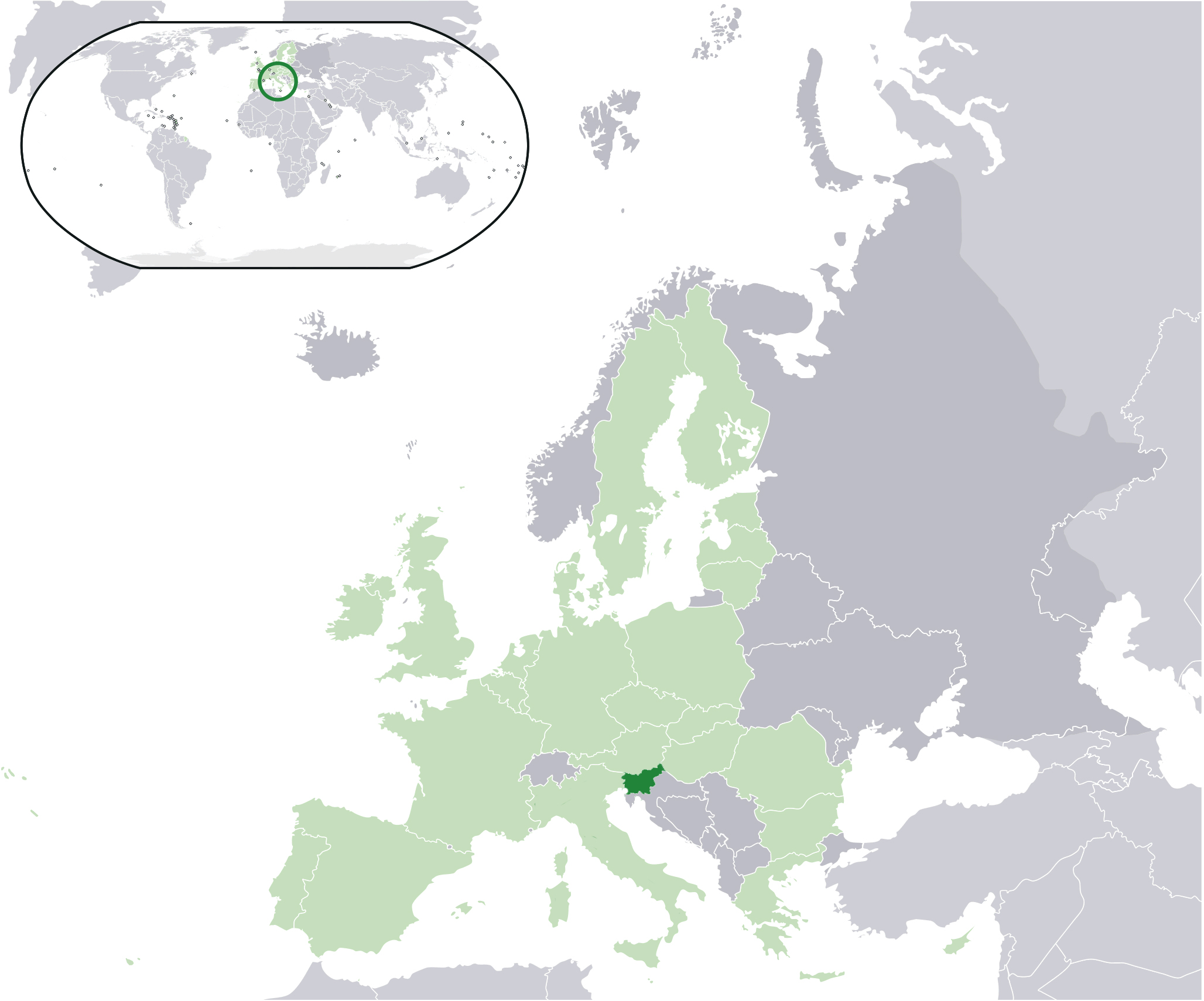
- ISO 3166 code: SI

Slovenia joined the eurozone on January 1, 2007. Although they did not mint any collectors' coin in 2007, it has built a small collection, with face values ranging from €3 to €100, made of silver, gold, and other materials.

Since the coins are fairly new, they can be easily obtained in the market at a lower value compared to the coins of other countries in the eurozone, particularly those difficult coins to find of 2002 or 2003.

=== Summary ===
Year	Issues	By metal			By face value		
Year	Issues	gold	silver	others	€100	€30	€3
2008	5	2	2	1	2	2	1
2009	5	2	2	1	2	2	1
2010	5	2	2	1	2	2	1
Total	15	6	6	3	6	6	3

== Spain ==
Kingdom of Spain Reino de España

=== Summary ===
Commemorative coins with a face value lower than €10 are not shown in the table below.

Year	Issues	By metal			By face value								
Year	Issues	gold	silver	others	€400	€300	€200	€100	€50	€30	€20	€12	€10
2002	15	2	13	–	1	–	1	–	1	–	–	1	11
2003	11	3	8	–	–	–	2	1	1	–	–	1	6
2004	18	5	13	–	1	–	3	1	2	–	–	2	9
2005	13	3	9	1	1	1	2	–	1	–	–	1	7
2006	11	2	8	1	1	1	1	–	1	–	–	1	6
2007	18	4	14	–	1	–	2	–	2	–	1	1	11
2008	15	5	10	–	1	–	3	–	2	–	1	1	7
2009	15	3	8	1	1	–	1	2	2	–	1	1	5
2010	13	3	10	4	1	–	1	-	1	–	2	1	6
2011	15	6	14	4	1	–	1	1	1	–	3	1	9
2012	16	5	14	7	1	–	2	1	2	1	1	-	9
2013	16	6	17	4	1	–	1	3	3	1	1	-	11
Total	161	47	138	22	11	2	20	9	19	2	10	11	97

== Vatican City ==
State of the Vatican City Stato della Città del Vaticano (in Italian)
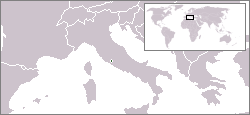
- ISO 3166 code: VA

=== Summary ===
Year	Issues	By metal			By face value				
Year	Issues	gold	silver	others	€100	€50	€20	€10	€5
2002	4	2	2	–	–	1	1	1	1
2003	4	2	2	–	–	1	1	1	1
2004	4	2	2	–	–	1	1	1	1
2005	5	2	3	–	–	1	1	1	2
2006	4	2	2	–	–	1	1	1	1
2007	4	2	2	–	–	1	1	1	1
2008	5	3	2	–	1	1	1	1	1
Total	30	15	15	–	1	7	7	7	8

== See also ==
- €2 commemorative coins
