= 5 euro cent coin =

Coin with value of one-twentieth of a euro

5 euro cent
- Eurozone (mainly) and other countries
- Value: 0.05 euro
- Mass: 3.92 g
- Diameter: 21.25 mm
- Thickness: 1.67 mm
- Edge: Smooth
- Composition: Copper-covered steel
- Years of minting: 1999–present

Obverse
- Design: Numerous variations, see below.
- Designer: Various
- Design date: Various

Reverse
- Design: Globe with the EU-15 highlighted next to the denomination shown in Latin characters
- Designer: Luc Luycx
- Design date: 2002

The 5 euro cent coin (€0.05) has a value of one twentieth of a euro and is composed of copper-covered steel. All euro coins have a common reverse and country-specific (national) obverse. The coin has been used since 2002 and was not re-designed in 2007 as was the case with the higher-value coins.

== History ==
The coin dates from 2002, when euro coins and banknotes were introduced in the then 12-member eurozone and its related territories. Despite this, the coins of some countries were issued beginning in 1999. The common side was designed by Luc Luycx, a Belgian artist who won a Europe-wide competition to design the new coins. The design of the 1 to 5-cent coins was intended to show the European Union's (EU) place in the world (relative to Africa and Asia) while the one and two euro coins showed the 15 states as one and the 10- to 50-cent coins showed separate EU states.

The design of the national sides, then fifteen (eurozone plus Monaco, San Marino and the Vatican who could also mint their own coins) was the subject of national competitions, but was subject to some uniform specifications such as the requirement to include twelve stars (see euro coins for more). National designs were not allowed to change until the end of 2008, unless a monarch (whose portrait usually appears on the coins) dies or abdicates. This happened in Monaco and the Vatican City, resulting in three new designs in circulation (the Vatican had an interim sede vacante design until the new Pope was elected). However, starting in 2007, some national designs underwent minor changes due to regulations requiring national designs to meet a series of specifications.

As the EU's membership has since expanded in 2004 and 2007, with further expansions envisaged, the common face of all euro coins from the value of 10-cent and above were redesigned in 2007 to show a new map. The 1- to 5-cent coins, however, did not change, as the highlighting of the old members over the globe was so faint it was not considered worth the cost. However, new national coin designs were added in 2007 with the entry in the eurozone of Slovenia, in 2008 with Cyprus and Malta, in 2009 with Slovakia, in 2011 with Estonia, in 2014 with Latvia, in 2015 with Lithuania, in 2023 with Croatia, and in 2026 with Bulgaria. Andorra began minting its own designs in 2014 after winning the right to do so.

== Design ==
Edge of all 5 euro cent coins

The coins are composed of copper-covered steel, with a diameter of 21.25 mm, a 1.67 mm thickness and a mass of 3.92 grams. The coins' edges are smooth. Coincidentally, the dimensions (though not the mass or composition) are nearly identical to those of Canadian and United States 5-cent coins. The coins have been used from 2002, though some are dated 1999 which is the year the euro was created as a currency, but not put into general circulation.

=== Reverse (common) side ===
The reverse was designed by Luc Luycx and displays a globe in the bottom right. The (then 15) members of the EU are lightly highlighted and the northern part of Africa and the western part of Asia (including the Middle East) are shown. Six fine lines cut diagonally behind the globe from each side of the coin and have twelve stars at their ends (reflective of the flag of Europe). To the top left is a large number 5 followed, in smaller text, by the words "Euro Cent". The designer's initials, LL, appear to the right of the globe.

Starting in 2017 coins from individual member states have started adjusting their common side design to a new version, identified by smaller and more rounded numeral "5" and longer lines outside of the stars at the coin's circumference.

=== Obverse (national) sides ===
The obverse side of the coin depends on the issuing country. All have to include the name or an abbreviation of the issuing country. The national side of circulation coins shall bear a circle of 12 stars that shall fully surround the national design, including the year mark and the indication of the issuing Member State’s name. The side cannot repeat the denomination of the coin unless the issuing country uses an alphabet other than Latin. Currently, Greece, Cyprus and Bulgaria are the only such countries. Greece engraves "5 ΛΕΠΤΑ" (5 lepta) on its coins and Bulgaria engraves "СТОТИНКИ" (stotinki). Austria ignores this rule, engraving "FŰNF EURO CENT" on its coins, hence will have to change its design to comply this rule.

Belgium, Finland, France, the Netherlands and Spain minted coins dated 1999, 2000 and 2001 although these entered circulation in 2002. Monaco minted coins dated 2001 although these entered circulation in 2002 too.

State	Details	Years of minting (years shown)	Image
(Andorra) Andorran euro coins	A Pyrenean chamois and a golden eagle. It features the word "Andorra" and the year of minting.	2014 onwards	
(Austria) Austrian euro coins	An Alpine primrose as a symbol of Austria's part in developing EU environmental policy. The words "FÜNF EURO CENT" (five euro cent, written on the coin as ”FŰNF EURO CENT”) appear at the top with a hatched Austrian flag below with the date.	2002 onwards	
(Belgium) Belgian euro coins	FIRST SERIES: An effigy of King Albert II. To the right-hand side among the stars was the king's monogram, a letter "A", underneath a crown. The year is lower down, also among the stars.	1999–2007	
(Belgium) Belgian euro coins	SECOND SERIES: A redesign to include the letters BE (standing for Belgium) beneath the monogram, which was moved out of the stars into the centre circle but still to the right of the king's renewed portrait. The date was also moved out and placed beneath the effigy and included two symbols either side (left: signature mark of the master of the mint, right: mint mark). This portrait did not comply with previous decisions by the ECOFIN in 2005 and 2008. Therefore, an amendment was made in 2009, which reverted to the portrait of Albert II found in the first series. Mint marks, year and stars remained the same.	2008–2013	
(Belgium) Belgian euro coins	THIRD SERIES: In 2013, Albert II abdicated with Philippe of Belgium becoming king. He subsequently replaced Albert on Belgian coins.	2014 onwards	
(Bulgaria) Bulgarian euro coins	A relief image of the Madara Horseman. The design also includes the year of issuance, the inscription “БЪЛГАРИЯ” (the country’s name in Bulgarian) and the word “СТОТИНКИ” (“CENT”) in Cyrillic script.	2026 onwards	
(Croatia) Croatian euro coins	A ligature for Glagolitic letters ⰘⰓ (HR) and the word "Hrvatska" ("Croatia"), accomplished by a checkerboard in the background, designed by Maja Škripelj.	2023 onwards	
(Cyprus) Cypriot euro coins	Two Mouflons, a species of wild sheep on Cyprus that represents the island's wildlife. It includes, in a semi-circle to the top right, the name of Cyprus in Greek and Turkish (ΚΥΠΡΟΣ and KIBRIS) each side of the date.	2008 onwards	
(Estonia) Estonian euro coins	A geographical image of Estonia and the word "Eesti" ("Estonia").	2011 onwards	
(Finland) Finnish euro coins	The heraldic lion of Finland found on the Coat of arms of Finland. It is a reproduction of a design by the sculptor Heikki Häiväoja and has been used by previous Finnish coins such as the 1-markka between 1964 and 2001. The first series included the initial of the mint master of the Mint of Finland, Raimo Makkonen (an M), on the bottom left side of the lion and the date to the left. In 2007, the initial was replaced by the mint's mint mark and the letters FI (for Finland) were included on the right hand side of the horizon. Finland again amended the design of its coins in the 2008 issue, repositioning the mint mark and putting it on the inside of the coin.	1999 onwards	
(France) French euro coins	Marianne, the feminine representation of France, its state and its values. It is the most prominent representation of France and its ideals of liberty and reason, dating from 1848. The depiction is young and determined, embodying France's desire for a sound and lasting Europe. The letters RF (République française), stylised, appear to the right above the year.	1999 onwards	
(Germany) German euro coins	An oak twig, an image carried over from the previous pfennig. The year and mint mark are shown at the bottom.	2002 onwards	
(Greece) Greek euro coins	A modern cargo tanker symbolising modern Greek enterprise. Above it is the denomination in Greek and the year.	2002 onwards	
(Republic of Ireland) Irish euro coins	The national emblem of Ireland, an Irish harp (the Cláirseach, see Clàrsach). Vertically on the left-hand side is the word "Éire" (Ireland in the Irish language) and on the right hand side is the date. The harp motif was designed by Jarlath Hayes.	2002 onwards	
(Italy) Italian euro coins	A depiction of the Flavian Amphitheatre (the Colosseum), built in the first century by Emperors Vespasian and Titus. The elliptical amphitheatre in the heart of Rome is Italy's most famous landmark and is one of the greatest works of architecture and engineering of the Roman Empire and the world. It includes the interconnected letters IR (Repubblica Italiana) to the top right and the year at the bottom.	2002 onwards	
(Latvia) Latvian euro coins	A small coat of arms of the Republic of Latvia above the word LATVIJA (Latvia).	2014 onwards	
(Lithuania) Lithuanian euro coins	The Vytis (symbol of the coat-of-arms) and the word "Lietuva", which means "Lithuania". The twelve stars, symbols of the EU, surrounds the Vytis.	2015 onwards	
(Luxembourg) Luxembourgish euro coins	FIRST SERIES: A stylised effigy of Grand Duke Henri of Luxembourg designed by Yvette Gastauer-Claire in consultation with the government and monarchy of Luxembourg. The name "LËTZEBUERG" (Luxembourg in Luxembourgish) and the year is written round the bottom of the coin.	2002–2025	
(Luxembourg) Luxembourgish euro coins	SECOND SERIES: On the left, a partial effigy of Grand Duke Guillaume looking towards the left. To the right of the effigy, the word "LËTZEBUERG" indicates the issuing country in a vertical reading from the bottom to the top. On the right, a stylised version of the Luxembourg flag is depicted. The year-date appears in the middle-part of the flag in a horizontal reading.	2026 onwards	
(Malta) Maltese euro coins	Depicts an altar of the prehistoric megalith Mnajdra temples. The temples were built in the fourth millennium BCE on the southern coast overlooking the sea. Beneath the depiction is the name Malta and the year.	2008 onwards	
(Monaco) Monégasque euro coins	FIRST SERIES: The coat of arms of Monaco with the name MONACO across the top of the coin's outer circle and the year across the bottom of the outer circle with the mint marks.	2001–2005	
(Monaco) Monégasque euro coins	SECOND SERIES: When Prince Albert II succeeded Prince Rainier III in 2005, the overall design was kept but the name and the year were moved within the circle to bring it in line with the new designs of the other coins that had changed significantly.	2006 onwards	
(Netherlands) Dutch euro coins	FIRST SERIES: A stylised profile of Queen Beatrix of the Netherlands surrounded by the twelve stars and other dots, with the inscription "Beatrix Queen of The Netherlands" in Dutch around the edge. The date and mint marks are located at the bottom.	1999–2013	
(Netherlands) Dutch euro coins	SECOND SERIES: Following the accession to the throne of King Willem-Alexander, a new series of euro coins was issued depicting the effigy of the new Head of State.	2014 onwards	
(Portugal) Portuguese euro coins	The royal seal of 1134 (stylised "Portugal") surrounded by the country's castles and five escutcheons with silver bezants set in relation to the surrounding European stars, and is intended to symbolise dialogue, exchange of values and dynamics in the building of Europe. Between the castles are the numbers of the year towards the bottom and the letters of the name Portugal between the upper icons. The stars are inset on a ridge.	2002 onwards	
(San Marino) Sammarinese euro coins	FIRST SERIES: The first of the Three Towers of San Marino: Guaita. In a semicircle above the tower to the right are the words San Marino and to the left, the date. The mint marks are shown to the lower right.	2002–2016	
(San Marino) Sammarinese euro coins	SECOND SERIES: The official coat of arms of the Republic of San Marino, the City Gate and the Church of St Quirinus, respectively.	2017 onwards	
(Slovakia) Slovak euro coins	Kriváň, a notable peak of the Tatra mountains. Kriváň symbolises Slovakia's sovereignty. Below is the name SLOVENSKO (Slovakia), then the year and the coat of arms of Slovakia with the mint marks either side.	2009 onwards	
(Slovenia) Slovenian euro coins	An interpretation of Ivan Grohar's painting of a sower. Grohar (1867–1911) was an Impressionist painter and is considered one of the leading figures of Slovene impressionism. The sower is a frequent motif in paintings and Grohar's image is embellished with round seeds and stars that, when scattered, float above the earth in elliptical patterns giving the impression of planets, drawing the sower close to the creator. The scattered stars join up with the twelve stars around the design (as in all the coins) and the number together reaches twenty-seven, the number of EU states that there were when Slovenia adopted the euro. Between each star round the right hand edge are the letters SLOVENIJA (Slovenia) with the date after it to the lower left.	2007 onwards	
(Spain) Spanish euro coins	FIRST SERIES: The Obradoiro façade of the Cathedral of Santiago de Compostela, a prime example of Spanish Baroque architecture started in 1667 by Jose del Toro and Domingo de Andrade and completed in the 18th century by Fernando Casas y Novoa. The cathedral, which is Romanesque and dates from 1128, is a major pilgrimage destination. The name España (Spain) is shown to the top left and the top left five stars are indented on a raised area, inverting the effect of the rest of the coin. The date is shown to the top right.	1999–2009	
(Spain) Spanish euro coins	SECOND SERIES: In 2010 the raised area around the stars was removed.	2010 onwards	
(Vatican City) Vatican euro coins	FIRST SERIES: An effigy of Pope John Paul II. The name CITTA DEL VATICANO (Vatican City), followed by the year and mint mark, was written in a break between the stars below.	2002–2005	
(Vatican City) Vatican euro coins	SECOND SERIES: Following the death of John Paul II in 2005, a new coin was issued during the Sede vacante until a new Pope was chosen. This contained the insignia of the Apostolic Chamber and the coat of arms of the Cardinal Chamberlain.	2005	
(Vatican City) Vatican euro coins	THIRD SERIES: When Pope Benedict XVI was elected, his effigy appeared on the coins, with the name of the city now broken to his top right with the year and mint mark in the middle to his right.	2006–2013	
(Vatican City) Vatican euro coins	FOURTH SERIES: In 2014 the coins were updated with the election of Pope Francis. CITTA DEL VATICANO is written around the top, broken by Pope Francis's head, with the date below the O in Vaticano.	2014–2016	
(Vatican City) Vatican euro coins	FIFTH SERIES: After the announcement that the image of Pope Francis would no longer appear on any coins issued by the Vatican, a new series of euro coins were issued to depict the papal coat of arms of Francis.	2017–2025	
(Vatican City) Vatican euro coins	SIXTH SERIES: Coat of arms of Pope Leo XIV.	2026 onwards	

==== Potential designs ====
Austria, Germany and Greece will also at some point need to update their designs to comply with guidelines stating they must include the issuing state's name or initials, and not repeat the denomination of the coin (Austria only). On the other hand, Slovenia and Greece have to comply with the star rule.

In addition, there are several EU states that have not yet adopted the euro. Some of them have already agreed upon their coin designs; however, it is not known if or when they will adopt the currency, and hence these are not yet minted. See enlargement of the Eurozone for expected entry dates of these countries.

== Nicknames ==
In the Netherlands, the coin carries the nickname stuiver, carried over from the previous currency. The three copper plated coins are also nicknamed koper, ros or rostjes in Flemish. In Italy, the 5 cent coin along with the 1 cent and the 2 cent ones are informally referred as ramini (from rame, copper) or bronzini (from bronzo, bronze).
