= Identifying marks on euro coins =

Before the introduction of the euro, the current eurozone members issued their own individual national coinage, most of which featured mint marks, privy marks and/or mint master marks. These marks have been continued as a part of the national designs of the euro coins, as well. This article serves to list the information about the various types of identifying marks on euro coins, including engraver and designer initials and the unique edge inscriptions found on the €2 coins.

== Date stamps on euro coins ==
Since the euro was officially introduced in 1999, most of the EMU member countries began producing their coins ahead of the 2002 introduction date. There is individual national legislation in place which governs the mintage of coins issued from each country. These coinage acts regulate the coin production parameters for each country.

=== Mintage date ===
The coinage acts of countries with a mintage date stipulation specify that the year the coin is minted, regardless of when the coins are issued, should appear on each coin. Belgium, Finland, France, the Netherlands and Spain have mintage date stipulations.

=== Issue date ===
The coinage acts of countries with an issue date stipulation specify that the year the coin is issued, regardless of when the coins are minted, should appear on each coin. Austria, Germany, Greece, Ireland, Italy, Luxembourg, Portugal, San Marino and the Vatican City have issue date stipulations.

=== Conclusion ===
Since the euro was first issued in 2002, the countries which have an issue date stipulation are all dated 2002 onward, even though these coins were minted in previous years to prepare for the adoption of the euro. As a result, there are no euro coins dated 1999, 2000 and 2001 issued from countries with an issue date stipulation.

Luxembourg has no domestic mint, so their coins are minted elsewhere. Regardless of the mintage location of these coins, the issue date stipulation in their coinage act must be followed by whichever country mints their coins and the date stamp is therefore applied accordingly.

Since Monaco, San Marino and the Vatican City do not have their own coinage acts, the date stamp is applied in accordance with the coinage act of whichever country mints these coins. France produces the euro coins for Monaco and follows the mintage date stipulation; it began minting Monégasque euro coins only in 2001, since the mintage quantities were so low. Sammarinese and Vatican euro coins are minted in Italy and follow the issue date stipulation.

== National identifying marks of euro coins ==
As per a recommendation defined by the Economic and Financial Affairs Council of the European Union, the national designs of each member's euro coin should contain a national identification in the form of spelling or abbreviation of the country's name. Of the fifteen members of the Eurozone at the time these recommendations were made, five national designs—those of Austria, Belgium, Finland, Germany and Greece—did not meet the criteria outlined. Of these five, two (Finland in 2007 and Belgium in 2008) have changed or amended their design to follow these recommendations, and the other three are expected to follow suit in the coming years.

National identifying marks on euro coins by country
| Country | Type | Description | Image |
|---|---|---|---|
| Andorra | Text | ANDORRA | |
| Austria | Text | REPUBLIK ÖSTERREICH (only on commemorative €2 issues since 2007) | |
| Austria | Symbol | Flag of Austria. The red is indicated by vertical hatching, as is traditionally done in heraldic illustration. | |
| Belgium | Text | BELGIE-BELGIQUE-BELGIEN | |
| Belgium | Symbol | Monogram of King Albert II | |
| Belgium | Symbol | Monogram of King Philippe | |
| Belgium | Abbreviation | B (€2 commemorative coin 2006) | |
| Belgium | Abbreviation | BE (België/Belgique/Belgien in Dutch, French and German) | |
| Bulgaria | Text | БЪЛГАРИЯ | |
| Bulgaria | Edge inscription | БОЖЕ ПАЗИ БЪЛГАРИЯ (God Protect Bulgaria in Bulgarian), only on €2 coins | |
| Croatia | Text | HRVATSKA | |
| Croatia | Symbol | Croatian checkerboard | |
| Cyprus | Text | ΚΥΠΡΟΣ/KIBRIS (in both Greek and Turkish) | |
| Estonia | Text | EESTI (Estonia) | |
| Finland | Abbreviation | FI (Finland) | |
| France | Text | RÉPUBLIQUE FRANÇAISE (French Republic in French) | French 2 Euro coin 2011. The design features a tree symbolising life, continuity and growth, standing within a hexagon and encircled by the motto of the French Republic, "Liberté, Egalité, Fraternité" (Liberty, equality, fraternity) |
| France | Abbreviation | stylised RF (République française) | French 2 Euro coin 2011. The design features a tree symbolising life, continuity and growth, standing within a hexagon and encircled by the motto of the French Republic, "Liberté, Egalité, Fraternité" (Liberty, equality, fraternity) |
| Germany | Text | BUNDESREPUBLIK DEUTSCHLAND (Federal Republic of Germany in German) (only on commemorative €2 issues until 2009 and commemorative €2 commonly issued coins until 2015) | |
| Germany | Abbreviation | D (only on commemorative €2 issues since 2010 (except commemorative €2 commonly issued coins from 2012 and 2015), not to be confused with Munich mint mark "D" on standard-issue designs of all denominations) | |
| Germany | Symbol | Depiction of the Bundesadler (Federal Eagle) (only on standard-issue €1 and €2 designs) | |
| Greece | Text | ΕΥΡΩΠΗ (EUROPA) 2 ΕΥΡΩ (Euro) | Greek 2 Euro coin 2002 featuring the word Europa and depicting a woman sat astride a bull. |
| Greece | Edge inscription | ΕΛΛΗΝΙΚΗ ΔΗΜΟΚΡΑΤΙΑ (Hellenic Republic in Greek), only on commemorative €2 issues since 2007 | Greek 2 Euro coin 2002 featuring the word Europa and depicting a woman sat astride a bull. |
| Ireland | Text / Symbol | éire (in Gaelic type) | Harp |
| Italy | Text | REPUBBLICA ITALIANA (Italian Republic in Italian) | Italian 1 Euro coin 2002. The design shows the famous drawing by Leonardo da Vinci, displayed in the gallery of the Academy in Venice, illustrating the ideal proportions of the human body. |
| Italy | Abbreviation | stylised RI (Repubblica Italiana) | Italian 1 Euro coin 2002. The design shows the famous drawing by Leonardo da Vinci, displayed in the gallery of the Academy in Venice, illustrating the ideal proportions of the human body. |
| Latvia | Text | LATVIJA | |
| Latvia | Symbol | LV (€2 commemorative coin 2014-2015) | |
| Lithuania | Text | LIETUVA | |
| Luxembourg | Text | LËTZEBUERG (Luxembourg in Luxembourgish) | |
| Luxembourg | Text | LUXEMBOURG (Luxembourg in French) | |
| Luxembourg | Symbol | monogram of Grand Duke Henri (€2 commemorative coin 2005) | |
| Luxembourg | Symbol | lion (€2 commemorative coin 2018 and onwards) | |
| Malta | Text | MALTA | |
| Monaco | Text | MONACO | |
| Netherlands | Text | WILLEM-ALEXANDER KONING DER NEDERLANDEN (Willem Alexander, King of the Netherlands) | |
| Netherlands | Text | BEATRIX KONINGIN DER NEDERLANDEN (Beatrix, Queen of the Netherlands) | |
| Netherlands | Text | NEDERLAND (€2 commemorative coin 2009, 2012, 2015) | |
| Netherlands | Text | KONINKRIJK DER NEDERLANDEN (€2 commemorative coin 2007) | |
| Portugal | Text | PORTUGAL | |
| San Marino | Text | SAN MARINO | |
| Slovakia | Text | SLOVENSKO | |
| Slovenia | Text | SLOVENIJA | |
| Spain | Text | ESPAÑA | |
| Vatican City | Text | CITTÀ DEL VATICANO (Vatican City) | |

== Mint marks ==
The use of mint marks on euro coins takes one of these three forms:

- a single letter representing a city or country
- the abbreviation of the country's mint
- the symbol of the country's mint

Mint marks on euro coins by country
| Country | Mint location | Mint mark | Mint mark description | Notes |
|---|---|---|---|---|
| Belgium (2005–2017) | Brussels | | Head of archangel St. Michael, patron saint of Brussels. | Prior to 2008, Belgian mark had only been used on commemorative issues. Since 2008, the mark is used on both standard issue and commemorative issue coins. |
| Belgium (2018–present) | Utrecht, Netherlands (since 2020: Houten, Netherlands) | | Mercury's wand, the logo of the Koninklijke Nederlandse Munt (Royal Dutch Mint) | |
| Finland (2007–2010) | Vantaa | | Logo of the Rahapaja Oy mint | Cornucopian logo. |
| Finland (2011–2024) | Vantaa | | Logo of the Rahapaja Oy mint | Heraldic lion logo. This mark was also used on the 2010 commemorative coin. |
| Finland (2025–present) | Houten, Netherlands | | Mercury's wand, the logo of the Koninklijke Nederlandse Munt (Royal Dutch Mint) | |
| France | Pessac | | Cornucopia, Different of the Monnaie de Paris | |
| Germany | German Euro coins are minted at 5 locations in Germany | A, D, F, G, J | Letters | A for Berlin, D for Munich, F for Stuttgart, G for Karlsruhe, J for Hamburg, while B, C, E and H used to be mint locations that had been closed prior to the introduction of the euro. |
| Greece (2002) | Madrid, Spain; Pessac, France; Vantaa, Finland; Athens | E (20c), F (1c, 2c, 5c, 10c and 50c), S (€1 and €2) | Letters | E for Spain (España), F for France, S for Finland (Suomi). The initial supply of Greek euro coins were produced at three locations, in addition to the Athens mint, due to their late entry into the European Monetary Union (EMU) just before the introduction date on 1 January 2002; only certain denominations of Greek coins with the date stamp of "2002" have these mint marks. Greek euro coins dated 2002 without these mint marks were produced in Athens, Greece. All Greek euro coins bear the standard Greek mint mark symbol of the Athens mint. |
| Greece (2002–present) | Athens | | Stylised acanthus leaf | |
| Italy | Rome | R | Letter | |
| Lithuania | Vilnius | | Lietuvos monetų kalykla (Lithuanian Mint House, LMK) logo | |
| Luxembourg (2002–2004) | Utrecht, Netherlands | | Mercury's wand, the logo of the Koninklijke Nederlandse Munt (Royal Dutch Mint) | |
| Luxembourg (2005–2006) | Vantaa, Finland | S, | Letter, logo of the (Suomen) Rahapaja Oy mint | |
| Luxembourg (2007–2008) | Pessac, France | F, | Letter, Cornucopia, Different of the Monnaie de Paris | |
| Luxembourg (2009–present) | Utrecht, Netherlands (since 2020: Houten, Netherlands) | | Mercury's wand, the logo of the Koninklijke Nederlandse Munt (Royal Dutch Mint) | |
| Malta (2008, 2016–2021) | Paris, France | F | Letter | |
| Malta (2009) | Utrecht, Netherlands | | Mercury's wand, the logo of the Koninklijke Nederlandse Munt (Royal Dutch Mint) | There were no standard issue coins in 2009, only one commemorative coin. |
| Monaco | Pessac, France | | Cornucopia, Different of the Monnaie de Paris (Paris Mint) | |
| Netherlands | Utrecht (since 2020: Houten) | | Mercury's wand, the logo of the Koninklijke Nederlandse Munt (Royal Dutch Mint) | |
| (Poland) | Warsaw | | Mennica Polska (Polish Mint) logo | Poland is not yet part of the Eurozone. When the euro is introduced, this is the mintmark which will be used. The Polish Mint logo is the letter M on top of the letter W and comes from Mennica Warszawa or Warsaw Mint |
| Portugal | Lisbon | INCM | Imprensa Nacional – Casa de Moeda (National Currency – Mint House) abbreviation | |
| Portugal (2020–present) | Lisbon | CASA DA MOEDA | Mint House text | This mark is only been used on commemorative issues. |
| San Marino | Rome, Italy | R | Letter | |
| Slovakia | Kremnica | | Mincovňa Kremnica (Kremnican Mint, MK) logo | |
| Slovenia (2007) | Vantaa, Finland | Fi | Abbreviation | |
| Slovenia (2008) | Utrecht, Netherlands | | Mercury's wand, the logo of the Koninklijke Nederlandse Munt (Royal Dutch Mint) | |
| Spain | Madrid | | Fábrica Nacional de Moneda y Timbre (National Factory of Currency and Stamps) logo | |
| Vatican | Rome, Italy | R | Letter | |

== Mint master marks and privy marks ==
Mint master marks or privy marks are symbols representing directors, chief engravers or chief executive officers of mints.

=== Belgium ===
The directors of the Monnaie Royale de Belgique/Koninklijke Munt van België (Royal Belgian Mint) in Brussels uses mint master's marks on all €2 commemorative coins and on all Belgian euro coins with a datestamp from 2008 onwards minted at this location.

Mint master marks on Belgian euro coins
| Mark | Mark description | Name of mint master | Coin dates |
|---|---|---|---|
| | Scale | Romain Coenen | 1999–2009 (€2 commemorative coins); 2008–2009 (standard issue euro coins) |
| | Quill | Serge Lesens | 2009-2012 (€2 commemorative coins); 2010–2012 (standard issue euro coins) |
| | Cat | Bernard Gillard | 2012-2016 (Commemorative coins); 2013-2016 (standard issue euro coins) |
| | Coat of arms of Herzele | Ingrid van Herzele | 2017–2022 |
| | Aster and Erlenmeyer flask | Giovanni Van de Velde | 2023–present |

=== Finland ===
The director of the Rahapaja Oy (Mint of Finland, LTD.) mint in Helsinki-Vantaa used a mint master's mark on Finnish euro coins minted at this location with the date stamp between 1999 and 2006.

Mint master mark on Finnish euro coins 1999–2006
| Mark | Mark description | Name of mint master | Coin dates |
|---|---|---|---|
| M | Letter | Raimo Makkonen | 1999–2006 |

=== France ===
The directors of Monnaie de Paris in Pessac use mint master's marks on all French euro coins minted at this location.

Mint master marks on French euro coins
| Mark | Mark description | Name of mint master | Coin dates |
|---|---|---|---|
| | Bee | Pierre Rodier | 1999–2000 |
| | Horseshoe | Gérard Buquoy | 2001–2002 |
| | Stylised heart with the initials of the mint master | Serge Levet | 2003 |
| | Hunting horn, a wave and a fish | Hubert Larivière | 2004–2010 |
| | Pentagon with letters AG, MP and YS | Yves Sampo | 2011–2020 |
| | Square with letters JJ | Joaquin Jimenez | 2021–present |

=== Luxembourg ===
Luxembourg euro coins dated 2002 were minted in the Netherlands in 2000 and thus bear the mint master mark of E. J. van Schauwenburg, Temporary Director of the Utrecht Mint during the year of coin production. The Coinage Act of Luxembourg stipulates that national coins cannot have a date stamp prior to the year of issue. Therefore, Luxembourg euro coins bear the mint master mark of the Temporary Director at the time of minting, despite the date on the coins.

Coins dated 2003–2004 bear the mint master mark of Maarten Brouwer, Director of the Utrecht Mint from 2003–2015. Luxembourgish euro coins dated 2005–2006 were produced at Rahapaja Oy (Mint of Finland), in Helsinki-Vantaa, Finland. Since the mint director does not affix a mint master mark to coins in production at that location, these coins do not bear a mint master mark but an S and the logo of the 'Suomen Rahapaja' instead.

Luxembourg euro coins dated 2007-2008 were produced at Monnaie de Paris, in Pessac, France and bear the mint master mark of Hubert Larivière, Director of the Paris Mint.

As of 2009, coins are again minted at the Royal Dutch Mint in Utrecht, the Netherlands. Until 2015 it was again the mint master mark of Maarten Brouwer. From 2016-2017 Kees Bruinsma was the Temporary Director of the Utrecht Mint.

Mint master marks on Luxembourgish euro coins
| Mark | Mark description | Name of mint master | Coin dates |
|---|---|---|---|
| | Bow and arrow with a star | E. J. van Schauwenburg | 2002 |
| | Sailboat | Maarten Brouwer | 2003–2004 |
| | Hunting horn, a wave and a fish | Hubert Larivière | 2007–2008 |
| | Sailboat | Maarten Brouwer | 2009–2015 |
| | Sailboat with a star | Kees Bruinsma | 2016–2017 |
| | St. Servatius Bridge | Stephan Satijn | 2017–2021 |
| | Raven | Bert van Ravenswaaij | 2022–present |

=== Monaco ===
Monegasque euro coins are produced by Monnaie de Paris, in Pessac, France beginning in 2001 and thus bear the mint master mark of Gérard Buquoy, Serge Levet, Hubert Larivière and Yves Sampo Directors of the Mint from 2001–2002, 2003, 2004–2010 and 2011–present respectively.

Mint master marks on Monegasque euro coins
| Mark | Mark description | Name of mint master | Coin dates |
|---|---|---|---|
| | Horseshoe | Gérard Buquoy | 2001–2002 |
| | Stylised heart with the initials of the mint master | Serge Levet | 2003 |
| | Hunting horn, a wave and a fish | Hubert Larivière | 2004–2010 |
| | Pentagon with letters AG, MP and YS | Yves Sampo | 2011–2020 |
| | Square with letters JJ | Joaquin Jimenez | 2021–present |

=== Netherlands ===
The mint masters of the Koninklijke Nederlandse Munt (Royal Dutch Mint) in Utrecht use mint master's marks on all Dutch euro coins minted at this location.

Mint master marks on Dutch euro coins
| Mark | Mark description | Name of mint master | Coin dates |
|---|---|---|---|
| | Bow and arrow | Drs. Chr. van Draanen | 1999 |
| | Bow and arrow with a star | E. J. van Schauwenburg | 2000 |
| | Vine branch and fruits | R. Bruens | 2001 |
| | Vine branch and fruits with a star | Maarten Brouwer | 2002 |
| | Sailboat | Maarten Brouwer | 2003–2015 |
| | Sailboat with a star | Kees Bruinsma | 2016–2017 |
| | St. Servatius Bridge | Stephan Satijn | 2017–2021 |
| | Raven | Bert van Ravenswaaij | 2022–present |

=== Slovenia ===
Slovenian euro coins dated 2008 were produced at Koninklijke Nederlandse Munt in Utrecht, the Netherlands, and bear the mint master mark of Maarten Brouwer, director of the Royal Dutch Mint from 2003 until 2015.

Mint master mark on Slovenian euro coins 2008
| Mark | Mark description | Name of mint master | Coin dates |
|---|---|---|---|
| | Sailboat | Maarten Brouwer | 2008 |

== Designer, sculptor and engraver initials on euro coins ==
Each country had the opportunity to design its own national side of the euro coin. Most coins bear the initials or the name of the designer somewhere in the national design. For example, all eight motives of the common reverse sides of the euro coins bear the stylised initials "LL" for Luc Luycx.

=== Designer, sculptor and engraver initials on standard euro coins ===
Inscriptions of initials on standard issue euro coins by country
| Euro coin denomination | Inscription image | Inscription text | Name | Title |
France
| 1, 2, 5 cent | | F. COURTIADE | Fabienne Courtiade | designer |
| 10, 20, 50 cent | | L. JORIO d'ap. O.ROTY | Laurent Jorio, Oscar Roty | designer |
| 1, 2 euro | | J. JIMENEZ | Joaquim Jimenez | designer |
Greece
| All denominations | | ΓΣ (stylised) | Georges Stamatopoulos | designer |
Italy
| 1 cent | | ED (stylised) | Eugenio Driutti | engraver |
| 2 cent | | LDS (stylised) | Luciana De Simoni | engraver |
| 5 cent | | ELF | Ettore Lorenzo Frapiccini | engraver |
| 10 cent | | CM | Claudia Momoni | engraver |
| 20 cent | | M.A.C. | Maria Angela Cassol | engraver |
| 50 cent | | M (stylised) | Roberto Mauri | engraver |
| 1 euro | | LC (stylised) | Laura Cretara | engraver |
| 2 euro | | M.C.C. | Maria Carmela Colaneri | engraver |
Luxembourg
| All denominations | | YGC (stylised) | Yvette Gastauer-Claire | designer |
Malta
| 1, 2 and 5 cent | | NGB | Noel Galea Bason | designer |
Portugal
| All denominations | | VS (stylised) | Vítor Manuel Fernandes dos Santos | designer |
San Marino (first series)
| All denominations | | Ch (stylised) | Frantisek Chochola | sculptor |
| All denominations | | ELF INC. | Ettore Lorenzo Frapiccini | engraver |
San Marino (second series)
| All denominations | | AL (stylised) | Arno Ludwig | sculptor |
| All denominations | | E.L.F MOD. | Ettore Lorenzo Frapiccini | engraver |
Slovakia
| 1, 2, 5 cent | | Z | Drahomír Zobek | designer |
| 10, 20, 50 cent | | JČ (stylised) and 'PK' (stylised) | Ján Černaj and Pavol Károly | designers |
| | | IŘ (stylised) | Ivan Řehák | designer |
Vatican City (first series)
| 1, 2 and 5 cent | | GV • UP INC. | Guido Veroi; Uliana Pernazza | sculptor engraver |
| 10, 20 and 50 cent | | GV • UP INC. | Guido Veroi; Uliana Pernazza | sculptor engraver |
| 1 and 2 euro | | GV • UP INC. | Guido Veroi; Uliana Pernazza | sculptor engraver |
Vatican City (second series)
| All denominations | | D. LONGO | Daniela Longo | sculptor |
| 1 cent | | M.A.C. INC. | Maria Angela Cassol | engraver |
| 2 cent | | LDS (stylised) INC. | Luciana De Simoni | engraver |
| 5 cent | | ELF INC. | Ettore Lorenzo Frapiccini | engraver |
| 10 cent | | M.C.C. INC. | Maria Carmela Colaneri | engraver |
| 20 cent | | M.A.C. INC. | Maria Angela Cassol | engraver |
| 50 cent | | LDS (stylised) INC. | Luciana De Simoni | engraver |
| 1 euro | | ELF INC. | Ettore Lorenzo Frapiccini | engraver |
| 2 euro | | M.C.C. INC. | Maria Carmela Colaneri | engraver |
Vatican City (third series)
| All denominations | | D.L. | Daniela Longo | sculptor |
| 1 and 2 cent | | LDS INC. | Luciana De Simoni | engraver |
| 5 cent | | ELF INC. | Ettore Lorenzo Frapiccini | engraver |
| 10 cent | | M.C.C. INC. | Maria Carmela Colaneri | engraver |
| 20 and 50 cent | | M.A.C. INC. | Maria Angela Cassol | engraver |
| 1 euro | | ELF INC. | Ettore Lorenzo Frapiccini | engraver |
| 2 euro | | M.C.C. INC. | Maria Carmela Colaneri | engraver |

=== Designer, sculptor and engraver initials on €2 commemorative coins ===
Inscriptions of initials on €2 commemorative coins by year
| Country | Inscription image | Inscription text | Name | Title |
2004
| Finland | | M M | Pertti Mäkinen; Raimo Makkonen | designer mint master |
| Greece | | KK; ΠΓ | Konstantinos Kazakos; Panagiotis Gravvalos | designer |
| Italy | | UP (stylised) | Uliana Pernazza | engraver |
| Luxembourg | | YGC (stylised) | Yvette Gastauer-Claire | sculptor |
| San Marino | | E.L.F. | Ettore Lorenzo Frapiccini | engraver |
| Vatican | | VEROI; L.D.S. INC. | Guido Veroi; Luciana De Simoni | designer engraver |
2005
| Belgium | | LL (stylised) | Luc Luycx | designer |
| Finland | | K | Tapio Kettunen | designer |
| Italy | | M.C.C. | Maria Carmela Colaneri | engraver |
| Luxembourg | | YGC (stylised); PB (stylised) | Yvette Gastauer-Claire; Patrice Bernabei | sculptor designer |
| San Marino | | LDS (stylised) INC. | Luciana De Simoni | engraver |
| Vatican | | LONGO; ELF INC. | Daniela Longo; Ettore Lorenzo Frapiccini | designer engraver |
2006
| Finland | | M (the two marks reflect the mirror motif of the coin) | Raimo Makkonen | mint master |
| Germany | | HH | Heinz Hoyer | designer |
| Italy | | M.C.C. | Maria Carmela Colaneri | engraver |
| San Marino | | LDS (stylised) | Luciana De Simoni | engraver |
| Vatican | | O.ROSSI; MCC INC. | Orietta Rossi; Maria Carmela Colaneri | designer engraver |
2007
| Germany | | HH | Heinz Hoyer | designer |
| Monaco | | R.B.BARON | R. B. Baron | designer |
| Portugal | | I Vilar (signature) | Irene Vilar | designer |
| San Marino | | E.L.F. | Ettore Lorenzo Frapiccini | engraver |
| Vatican | | LONGO; MCC INC. | Daniela Longo; Maria Carmela Colaneri | designer engraver |
2008
| Finland | | K | Tapio Kettunen | sculptor |
| Germany | | OE (stylised) | Erich Ott | designer |
| Italy | | MCC | Maria Carmela Colaneri | engraver |
| Portugal | | Esc. J. Duarte | João Duarte | sculptor |
| San Marino | | E.L.F. | Ettore Lorenzo Frapiccini | engraver |
| Vatican | | VEROI | Guido Veroi | engraver |
2009
| Germany | | FB | Friedrich Brenner | sculptor |
| Greece | | ΓΣ | Georgios Stamatopoulos | sculptor |
| Italy | | M.C.C. | Maria Carmela Colaneri | engraver |
| Portugal | | J.AURÉLIO | José Aurélio | plastic artist |
| San Marino | | A.M. | Annalisa Masini | engraver |
| Slovakia | | PK | Pavol Károly | engraver |
| Vatican | | O. ROSSI; M.C.C. INC. | Orietta Rossi; Maria Carmela Colaneri | designer engraver |
2010
| Germany | | BB | Bodo Broschat | engraver |
| Greece | | ΓΣ | Georgios Stamatopoulos | sculptor |
| Italy | | C.M. | Claudia Momoni | engraver |
| Portugal | | JOSÉ CÂNDIDO | José Cândido | engraver |
| San Marino | | m | Roberto Mauri | engraver |
| Vatican | | VEROI; ELF INC. | Guido Veroi; Ettore Lorenzo Frapiccini | designer engraver |
2011
| Finland | | V | Hannu Veijalainen | artist |
| Germany | | HH | Heinz Hoyer | engraver |
| Italy | | ELF INC. | Ettore Lorenzo Frapiccini | engraver |
| Portugal | | IC - FB | Isabel Carriço and Fernando Branco | designers |
| San Marino | | C.M. | Claudia Momoni | engraver |
| Slovakia | | MR | Miroslav Rónai | designer |
| Vatican | | O. ROSSI; M.C.C. INC. | Orietta Rossi; Maria Carmela Colaneri | designer engraver |
2012
| Finland | | T | Erja Tielinen | sculptor |
| Germany | | Œ (stylised) | Erich Ott | engraver |
| Italy | | M.C.C. | Maria Carmela Colaneri | engraver |
| Portugal | | JOSÉ DE GUIMARÃES | José De Guimarães | designer |
| Vatican | | G. TITOTTO; LDS INC. | Gabriella Titotto; Luciana De Simoni | designer engraver |
2013
| Germany | | ER (stylised) | Eugen Ruhl | engraver |
| Greece | | ΣtΑΜ (stylised) | Georgios Stamatopoulos | engraver |
| Italy | | m (stylised); MCC | Roberto Mauri; Maria Carmela Colaneri | engraver engraver |
| Netherlands | | KЯCL (stylised); P | Claudia Linders and Roosje Klap; Pannos Goutzemisis | designers |
| Portugal | | HUGO MACIEL | Hugo Maciel | designer |
| San Marino | | MOMONI | Claudia Momoni | engraver |
| Slovakia | | mh (stylised) | Miroslav Hric | designer |
| Vatican | | P. DANIELE; M.C.C. INC. | Patrizio Daniele; Maria Carmela Colaneri | sculptor engraver |
2014
| Germany | | OE (stylised) | Erich Ott | engraver |
| Greece | | MA (stylised) | Maria Andonatou | engraver |
| Italy | | LDS (stylised); C.M. | Luciana De Simoni; Claudia Momoni | engraver engraver |
| Netherlands | | P | Pannos Goutzemisis | designer |
| Portugal | | JOSÉ TEIXEIRA | José Teixeira | designer |
| San Marino | | MCC; UP (stylised) | Maria Carmela Colaneri; Uliana Pernazza | engraver engraver |
| Slovakia | | MP (stylised) | Mária Poldaufová | designer |
| Vatican | | G. TITOTTO; C.M. INC | Gabriella Titotto; Claudia Momoni | designer engraver |
2015
| France | | .J (stylised) | Joaquin Jimenez | engraver |
| Germany | | HH; BW | Heinz Hoyer; Bernd Wendhut | engraver sculptor |
| Greece | | ΓΣ; ΣtΑΜ (stylised) | Georgios Stamatopoulos | engraver |
| Italy | | MGU; SP | Maria Grazia Urbani; Silvia Petrassi | engraver engraver |
| Malta | | NGB | Noel Galea Bason | designer |
| Portugal | | A.M. F Fonseca (signature) | António Marinho; Fernando Fonseca | designer designer |
| San Marino | | AM; ES | Annalisa Masini; Erik Spiekermann | engraver designer |
| Slovakia | | IŘ (stylised) | Ivan Řehák | designer |
| Vatican | | C. PRINCIPE; E.L.F. INC. | Chiara Principe; Ettore Lorenzo Frapiccini | designer engraver |
2016
| Finland | | K | Tapio Kettunen | sculptor |
| Germany | | JT | Jordi Truxa | designer |
| Greece | | ΣtΑΜ (stylised) | Georgios Stamatopoulos | engraver |
| Italy | | LDS (stylised) | Luciana De Simoni | engraver |
| Italy | | C.M. | Claudia Momoni | engraver |
| Malta | | NGB | Noel Galea Bason | designer |
| Portugal | | JOANA VASCONCELOS | Joana Vasconcelos | designer |
| San Marino | | MB | Matt Bonaccorsi | engraver |
| Slovakia | | VP (stylised) | Vladimír Pavlica | designer |
| Vatican | | M. CRISCIOTTI; MOMONI INC. | Mariangela Crisciotti; Claudia Momoni | designer engraver |
| Vatican | | D.LONGO; SP INC | Daniela Longo; Silvia Petrassi | designer engraver |
2017
| France | | .J (stylised) | Joaquin Jimenez | designer |
| Germany | | Ch (stylised) | František Chocola | designer |
| Greece | | ΣtΑΜ (stylised) | Georgios Stamatopoulos | engraver |
| Italy | | LDS (stylised) | Luciana De Simoni | engraver |
| Italy | | C.M. | Claudia Momoni | engraver |
| Malta | | NGB | Noel Galea Bason | designer |
| Portugal | | LUIS FILIPE DE ABREU | Luis Filipe de Abreu | designer |
| San Marino | | LDS (stylised) | Luciana De Simoni | designer |
| San Marino | | A UP INC. | Andrew Lewis; Uliana Pernazza | designer engraver |
| Slovakia | | MP (stylised) | Mária Poldaufová | designer |
| Vatican | | O.ROSSI; SP INC. (stylised) | Orietta Rossi; Silvia Petrassi | designer engraver |
| Vatican | | G.TITOTTO; MOMONI INC. | Gabriella Titotto; Claudia Momoni | designer engraver |
2018
| Belgium | | LL (stylised) | Luc Luycx | designer |
| France | | .J (stylised) | Joaquin Jimenez | designer |
| Germany | | BB (stylised) | Bodo Broschat | designer |
| Greece | | ΣtΑΜ (stylised) | Georgios Stamatopoulos | engraver |
| Italy | | UP (stylised) | Uliana Pernazza | engraver |
| Italy | | SP (stylised) | Silvia Petrassi | engraver |
| Lithuania | | JP | Justas Petrassi | designer |
| Malta | | NGB | Noel Galea Bason | designer |
| Portugal | | Eduardo Aires | Eduardo Aires | designer |
| San Marino | | LDS (stylised) | Luciana De Simoni | designer |
| San Marino | | A.M. | Annalisa Masini | designer |
| Slovakia | | PK (stylised) | Pavol Károly | designer |
| Vatican | | D.LONGO; C.M. INC. | Daniela Longo; Claudia Momoni | designer engraver |
| Vatican | | P. DANIELE; V.D.S. INC. | Patrizio Daniele; Valerio De Seta | designer engraver |
2019
| Belgium | | LL (stylised) | Luc Luycx | designer |
| France | | .J (stylised) | Joaquin Jimenez | designer |
| Germany | | MO (stylised) | Michael Otto | painter |
| Greece | | ΣtΑΜ (stylised) | Georgios Stamatopoulos | engraver |
| Italy | | M.A.C. | Maria Angela Cassol | engraver |
| Malta | | NGB | Noel Galea Bason | designer |
| Portugal | | L.F. ABREU | Luis Filipe de Abreu | designer |
| Portugal | | pomar (signature) | Júlio Pomar | designer |
| San Marino | | UP (stylised) | Uliana Pernazza | designer |
| San Marino | | M.A.C. | Maria Angela Cassol | designer |
| Slovakia | | PV (stylised) | Peter Valach | designer |
| Vatican | | D.LONGO; INC. A.M. | Daniela Longo; Annalisa Masini | designer engraver |
| Vatican | | FUSCO; CASSOL INC. | Daniela Fusco; Maria Angela Cassol | designer engraver |
2020
| Belgium | | LL (stylised) | Luc Luycx | designer |
| France | | .J (stylised) | Joaquin Jimenez | designer |
| Germany | | JT (stylised) | Jordi Truxa | designer |
| Germany | | BB (stylised) | Bodo Broschat | designer |
| Greece | | ΣtΑΜ (stylised) | Georgios Stamatopoulos | engraver |
| Italy | | LDS (stylised) | Luciana De Simoni | engraver |
| Malta | | NGB | Noel Galea Bason | designer |
| Portugal | | ANDRÉ LETRIA | André Letria | designer |
| Portugal | | Esc. J.J. BRITO | José João de Brito | engraver |
| San Marino | | C.M. | Claudia Momoni | designer |
| San Marino | | A.M. | Annalisa Masini | designer |
| Slovakia | | PV (stylised) | Peter Valach | designer |
| Vatican | | D.LONGO; SP. A.M. | Daniela Longo; Silvia Petrassi | designer engraver |
| Vatican | | G.TITOTTO; M.A.C. INC. | Gabriella Titotto; Maria Angela Cassol | designer engraver |
2021
| Belgium | | LL (stylised) | Luc Luycx | designer |
| France | | .J (stylised) | Joaquin Jimenez | designer |
| Germany | | MO (stylised) | Michael Otto | painter |
| Greece | | ΣtΑΜ (stylised) | Georgios Stamatopoulos | engraver |
| Italy | | UP (stylised) | Uliana Pernazza | engraver |
| Italy | | C.M. | Claudia Momoni | engraver |
| Malta | | NGB | Noel Galea Bason | designer |
| Malta | | MAF (stylised) | Maria Anna Frisone | designer |
| Portugal | | EDUARDO AIRES | Eduardo Aires | designer |
| Portugal | | F.PROVIDÊNCIA | Francisco Providência | sculptor |
| San Marino | | SP (stylised) | Claudia Momoni | designer |
| San Marino | | VdS | Valerio De Seta | designer |
| Slovakia | | BR (stylised) | Branislav Rónai | designer |
| Vatican | | CP (stylised); UP. INC. | Chiara Principe; Uliana Pernazza | designer engraver |
| Vatican | | P.DANIELE; A.M. INC. | Patrizio Daniele; Annalisa Masini | designer engraver |

== €2 edge inscriptions ==
With each member of the Eurozone comes a set of individual coin designs. Included in the individuality of the national obverse face of the euro coins, whose design is left to the member states, is the edge of the €2 coin. Each member was allowed to design a unique inscription that would appear on the €2 coin's edge. Some of these edge inscriptions are carried over from the coins of the yielded currencies in circulation prior to the introduction of the euro.

=== Standard issue €2 edge inscriptions ===
Standard €2 edge inscriptions by country
| Country | Edge inscription | Description |
|---|---|---|
| Andorra, Belgium, France, Ireland, Luxembourg, Monaco, Spain | | The sequence "2 ★ ★" repeated six times alternately upright and inverted. |
| Austria | | The sequence "2 EURO ★★★" repeated four times alternately upright and inverted. |
| Bulgaria | | The inscription “• БОЖЕ ПАЗИ БЪЛГАРИЯ” (“BOZHE PAZI BŬLGARIA”: “GOD PROTECT BULGARIA” in Bulgarian) is written twice, both normally and in reverse. |
| Croatia | | "O LIJEPA O DRAGA O SLATKA SLOBODO" ("Oh beautiful, oh dear, oh sweet freedom" in Croatian, from Dubravka). |
| Cyprus | | The sequence "2 ΕΥΡΩ 2 EURO" repeated twice (2 EURO in Greek and Turkish). |
| Estonia | | "EESTI ○" (ESTONIA in Estonian) upright and inverted. |
| Finland | | "SUOMI FINLAND" (FINLAND in both Finnish and Swedish, the two official languages in Finland), followed by three lion's heads. |
| Germany | | "EINIGKEIT UND RECHT UND FREIHEIT" (UNITY AND JUSTICE AND FREEDOM in German), Germany's national motto and the beginning of Germany's national anthem, followed by the Federal Eagle. |
| Greece | | "ΕΛΛΗΝΙΚΗ ΔΗΜΟΚΡΑΤΙΑ ★" ("ELLINIKI DHIMOKRATIA": "HELLENIC REPUBLIC" in Greek). |
| Italy, San Marino, Vatican | | The sequence "2 ★" repeated six times alternately upright and inverted. |
| Latvia | | "DIEVS ★ SVĒTĪ ★ LATVIJU ★" (GOD BLESS LATVIA) |
| Lithuania | | "LAISVĖ ★ VIENYBĖ ★ GEROVĖ ★" ("Freedom, Unity, Prosperity" in Lithuanian) |
| Malta | | The sequence "2✠✠" (with Maltese crosses) repeated six times alternately upright and inverted |
| Netherlands | | "GOD ★ ZIJ ★ MET ★ ONS ★" (GOD BE WITH US in Dutch). The same lettering had been applied to the larger denomination guilder coins. |
| Portugal | | The edge design features the seven castles and five coats of arms also found on the national side, all equally spaced. |
| Slovakia | | "SLOVENSKÁ REPUBLIKA" (SLOVAK REPUBLIC in Slovak) with two stars and linden leaf between. |
| Slovenia | | "SLOVENIJA •" (SLOVENIA in Slovene) |

=== Commemorative issue €2 edge inscriptions ===
Generally the edge inscription of a €2 commemorative coin does not change from the standard issue counterpart. There are a few exceptions.

Commemorative €2 edge inscriptions by issue date
| Year and Country | Edge inscription | Description |
|---|---|---|
| Finland (2005) | | "YK 1945–2005 FN" ("UN 1945–2005 UN" in Finnish and Swedish, the official languages of Finland) followed by three lion's heads. "YK" stands for Yhdistyneet Kansakunnat and "FN" for Förenta Nationerna. Issued to commemorate the 60th anniversary of the founding of the United Nations and Finland's 50 year membership in the UN. |
| Finland (2007) | | "ROMFÖRDRAGET 50 ÅR EUROPA" ("TREATY OF ROME 50 YEARS EUROPE" in Swedish, one of the official languages of Finland. The same words in Finnish - "ROOMAN SOPIMUS 50 V EUROOPPA" - appear on the face of this coin). Issued to commemorate the 50th anniversary of the signing of the Treaty of Rome. |
| Finland (2009) | | "TALOUS-JA RAHALIITTO EMU" ("ECONOMIC AND MONETARY UNION EMU" in Finnish, one of the official languages of Finland. Issued to commemorate the 10th anniversary of the Economic and Monetary Union of the European Union. |

In 2008, a European Commission's recommendation was approved in which the following was stated: "The legend engraved on the edge of the commemorative euro coins intended for circulation must be the same as that on the normal euro coins intended for circulation." In 2012, a European Regulation was approved in which, with a binding nature, the previous restriction was specified.
