= Belgian coins =

Belgian coins may refer to:

- Belgian franc - the old Belgian currency
- Belgian euro coins - the Belgian euro coins
- Euro gold and silver commemorative coins (Belgium) - commemorative coins of Belgium
