= Central American Mint =

Coin production facility located in San Salvador

The Central American Mint, Limited was a coin production facility located in San Salvador, El Salvador. The mint existed from 1892 to 1896, however, coins bearing the "C.A.M." mint mark were produced by several foreign mints on behalf of the Treasury of El Salvador well into the beginning of the twentieth century.

For the Salvadoran people, who in 1892 were suffering from an economic crisis in part brought on by the worldwide depreciation of silver, the Central American Mint provided a source of economic independence and national pride. Unlike the prevailing practice of using coins from foreign countries, having their own mint and coinage was viewed as a positive step by President Carlos Basilio Ezeta y León, and would help Salvadorans keep their own economy under control.

== History ==
In May 1891 the Legislative Assembly of El Salvador authorized the granting of an exclusive concession to a private citizen, in association with a French institution, for establishing a mint that would produce coins bearing the Salvadoran insignia. The concession was awarded to Enrique Arbizú and his associate Sebastion Barris y Serra, who were doing business as the "General Coin Syndicate of Paris", chartered to set up a coin minting facility in the Salvadoran capital city of San Salvador.

The mint was formally inaugurated on August 28, 1892; Salvadoran President Carlos Basilio Ezeta y León shared his sentiments in his speech during the inauguration ceremony:

"I solemnly declare open the Salvadoran Mint. This very important undertaking, which may seem to increase the fears brought about by the economic crisis, will actually serve the purpose of averting it if our delegated citizens are able to come up with positive solutions to our problems. Having our own coinage is a long-standing need and we now are about to have it. Foreign coins will now be accepted as merchandise in our domestic markets, with their prices fixed by demand. I congratulate the enterprise and its distinguished manager for the expedience in setting up the facility, and I express my wish for the Salvadoran coins to fulfill our expectations."

In January 1896, having fulfilled its contract with the Treasury of El Salvador, the Central American Mint delivered its coin dies to the Treasury and ceased operations.

== Operations ==
The facility, located at 70 El Calvario Street in San Salvador, was managed by Henry Guarracine and consisted of two buildings with a built-in concrete and steel safe for the storage of precious metals. The facility had 9,700 available square feet for coin production equipment and determined to be both fire and earthquake proof.

The equipment used for coin production consisted of:

- 3 Robey & Co. steam engine power units
- 5 foundries; 3 for silver, 2 for gold
- 5 steam-driven laminators
- 2 manual and 6 steam-driven cutters
- 2 Uhlhorn toggle-lever coin presses
- 1 coin press from Société J. F. Cail & Cie
- Refining and plating electrolytic equipment
- Assay laboratory equipment

The overall rated capacity of the mint was 114,000 coins per 20-hour workday.

The coins produced by the Central American Mint included:

- Copper 1 Centavo
- Silver 5 Centavos
- Silver 10 Centavos
- Silver 20 Centavos
- Silver 50 Centavos (Flag)
- Silver 50 Centavos (Columbus)
- Silver 1 Peso (Flag)
- Silver 1 Colón (Columbus)
- Gold 2.5 Pesos
- Gold 5 Pesos
- Gold 10 Pesos
- Gold 20 Pesos
- Pattern (Prototype) Coins
- Presentation (Commemorative) Coins

== The C.A.M. mint mark ==
Following the closure of the Central American Mint, coins bearing the "C.A.M." mint mark were produced by several foreign mints on behalf of the Treasury of El Salvador. For example, silver Colón coins (informally known as "Bambas") were minted in San Salvador (1892-1896), Brussels (1904–1914), Hamburg (1904-1908), San Francisco (1904-1911) and Philadelphia (1911-1914); all of which bear the C.A.M. mint mark without distinction.

== C.A.M. Silver Colón Mintage ==
The C.A.M. silver colón mintage was as follows:

	San Salvador Mint	Royal Mint of Belgium	Hamburgische Münze	San Francisco Mint	Philadelphia Mint	Worldwide C.A.M. mintage
1892	250,500	0	0	0	0	250,500
1893	354,500	0	0	0	0	354,500
1894	2,249,800	0	0	0	0	2,249,800
1895	2,161,700	0	0	0	0	2,161,700
1896	<300	0	0	0	0	<300
1904	0	450,000	150,000	400,000	0	1,000,000
1908	0	1,600,000	700,000	0	0	2,300,000
1909	0	0	0	693,170	0	693,170
1911	0	500,000	0	519,993	511,108	1,531,101
1914	0	700,000	0	0	2,100,000	2,800,000
