= Euro coins =

Eight euro coin denominations ranging from one cent to two euro

There are eight denominations of euro coins, ranging from one cent to two euro (the euro is divided into a hundred cents). The coins first came into use in 2002. They have a common reverse, portraying a map of Europe, but each country in the eurozone has its own design on the obverse, which means that each coin has a variety of different designs in circulation at once. Four European microstates that are not members of the European Union (Andorra, Monaco, San Marino, and the Vatican City) use the euro as their currency and also have the right to mint coins with their own designs on the obverse side.

The coins are minted at numerous national mints across the eurozone to strict national quotas. Not every eurozone member state has its own mint. Obverse designs are chosen nationally, while the reverse and the currency as a whole is managed by the European Central Bank (ECB).

In addition, individual countries may issue 2 euro commemorative coins, valid throughout the eurozone; as well as "collector coins", not intended for circulation, usually minted in precious metals, with a different face value and design from those intended for circulation, and valid only in the issuing country.

== History ==

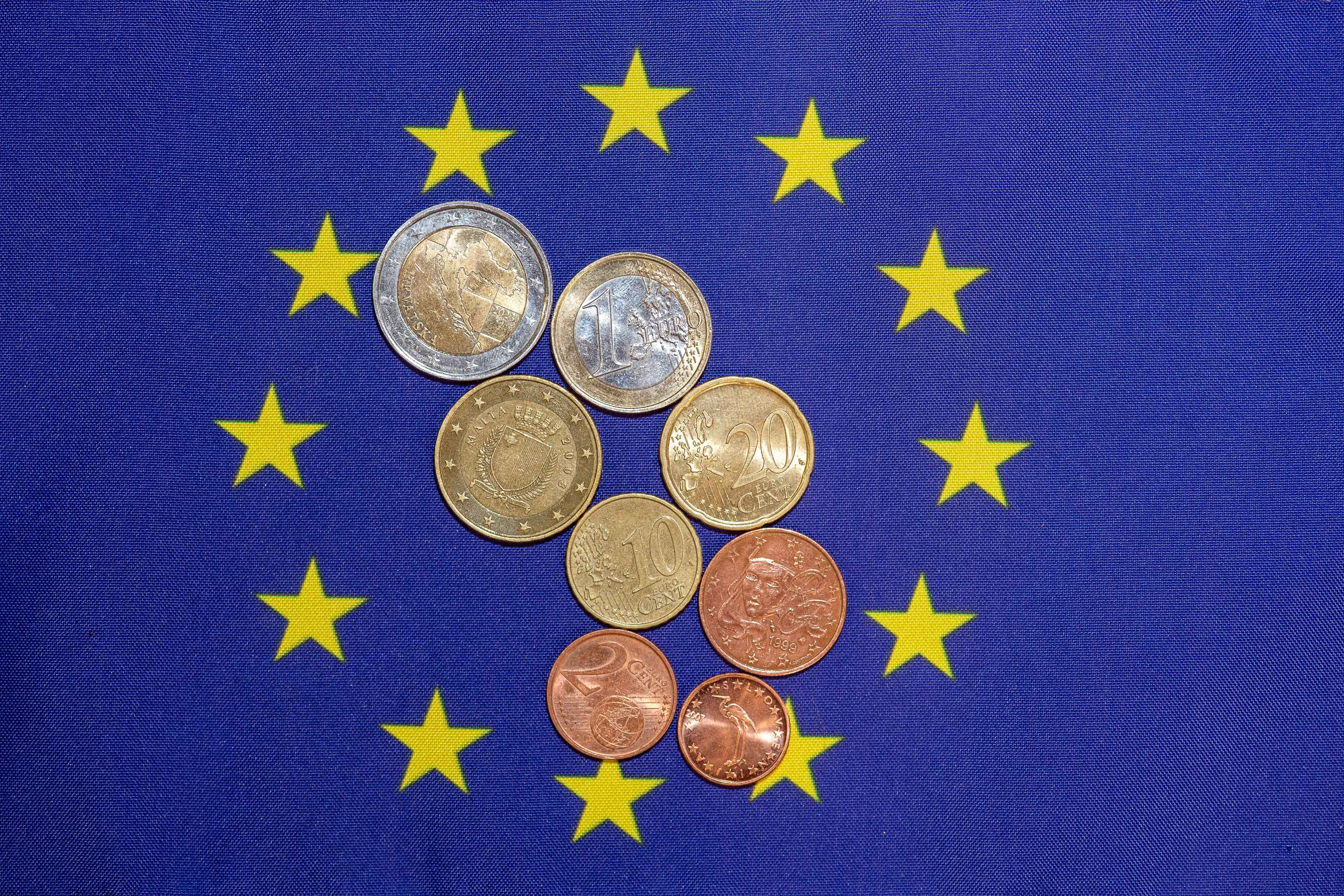
The eight euro coins. Four show the obverse designs from different countries (Croatian €2, Maltese 50c, French 5c, and Slovenian 1c); the remainder show the shared reverse.

The euro came into existence on 1 January 1999. It had been a goal of the European Union (EU) and its predecessors since the 1960s. The Maastricht Treaty entered into force in 1993 with the goal of creating economic and monetary union by 1999 for all EU states except the United Kingdom and Denmark (even though Denmark has a fixed exchange rate policy with the euro).

In 1999, the currency was born virtually and in 2002 notes and coins began to circulate. It rapidly replaced the former national currencies and the eurozone has since expanded further to some newer EU states. In 2009 the Lisbon Treaty formalised its political authority, the Eurogroup, alongside the European Central Bank.

In 2004, the very first €2 commemorative coin was issued by Greece to celebrate the Olympic Games in Athens in 2004.

As the EU's membership has since expanded in 2004, 2007 and 2013, with further expansions envisaged, the common face of all euro coins from the value of 10c and above were redesigned in 2007 to show a new map.

Slovenia joined the eurozone in 2007, Cyprus and Malta joined in 2008, Slovakia in 2009, Estonia in 2011, Latvia in 2014, Lithuania in 2015, Croatia in 2023 and Bulgaria in 2026, thus introducing nine more national-side designs.

== Specification ==
There are eight different denominations of euro coins: €0.01, €0.02, €0.05, €0.10, €0.20, €0.50, €1.00 and €2.00 The €0.01, €0.02 and €0.05 coins show Europe in relation to Asia and Africa in the world. The remaining coins show the EU before its enlargement in May 2004 if minted before 1 January 2007, a map of Europe if minted after. Coins from Austria, Italy, Portugal, San Marino and the Vatican City show the map if minted in 2008 or later.

| 1€-Vatican_Franciscus-Revers |

Vatican Euro coins with images of Pope Francis and Pope Benedict XVI

The common side was designed by Luc Luycx of the Royal Belgian Mint. They symbolise the unity of the EU. The national sides were designed by the national central banks of the Eurosystem in separate competitions. There are specifications which apply to all coins such as the requirement of including twelve stars. National designs were not allowed to change until the end of 2008, unless a monarch (whose portrait usually appears on the coins) dies or abdicates. National designs have seen some changes due to a new rule stating that national designs should include the name of the issuing country.

The common side of the €0.01, €0.02 and €0.05 coins depict the denomination, the words 'EURO CENT' beside it, twelve stars and Europe highlighted on a globe in relation to Asia and Africa in the world. The common side of the €0.10, €0.20 and €0.50 coins currently depict the denomination on the right, the words 'EURO CENT' underneath it, with twelve stars and the European continent on the left.

Coins minted from 1999 to 2006 depicted only the EU15, rather than the entire European continent, which is on coins minted after 2007. The common side of the €1 and €2 coins depict the denomination on the left, the currency, map of Europe and twelve stars on the right. Similarly, coins minted from 1999 to 2006 depicted the EU15, rather than the whole European continent, which is on coins minted from 2007.

The 1c, 2c and 5c coins, however, keep their old design, showing a geographical map of Europe with the 15 member states of 2002 raised somewhat above the rest of the map.

Euro coins – Common side
| Value | Image | | Colour | | Measurements | | | Composition | Edge |
| Value | 1999–2007 | 2007–present | Main | Secondary | Diameter (mm) | Thickness (mm) | Mass (g) | Composition | Edge |
|---|---|---|---|---|---|---|---|---|---|
| 1c | | | Bronze | None | 16.25 | 1.67 | 2.30 | Copper-covered steel | Smooth |
| 2c | | | Bronze | None | 18.75 | 1.67 | 3.06 | Copper-covered steel | Smooth with a groove |
| 5c | | | Bronze | None | 21.25 | 1.67 | 3.92 | Copper-covered steel | Smooth |
| 10c | | | Gold | None | 19.75 | 1.93 | 4.10 | Nordic Gold | Shaped edge with fine scallops |
| 20c | | | Gold | None | 22.25 | 2.14 | 5.74 | Nordic Gold | Plain with seven indents (Spanish Flower) |
| 50c | | | Gold | None | 24.25 | 2.38 | 7.80 | Nordic Gold | Shaped edge with fine scallops |
| €1 | | | Silver | Gold | 23.25 | 2.33 | 7.50 | Outer part: nickel brass Inner part: Layers of copper-nickel, nickel, copper-nickel | Interrupted milled |
| €2 | | | Gold | Silver | 25.75 | 2.20 | 8.50 | Outer part: copper-nickel Inner part: Layers of nickel brass, nickel, nickel brass. | Fine milled with edge lettering (varies according to issuing state) |

== Design ==
=== Common side ===
All coins have a common reverse side showing how much the coin is worth, with a design by Belgian designer Luc Luycx. The design of the 1c, 2c and 5c coins shows Europe's place in the world as a whole, The 10c coins and above show either the 15 countries that were the European Union in 2002, or, if minted after 2007, the whole European continent, along with Luc Luycx's signature, which is visible as two L letters connected together (LL). Coins from Austria, Italy, Portugal, San Marino and the Vatican City show the new design if minted 2008 or later. The coins symbolise the unity of the EU.

==== Current design ====
On June 7 2005, the European Council decided that the common side of the 10 euro cent to €2 coins should be brought up to date to reflect the enlargement of the EU in 2004. The 1c, 2c and 5c coins show Europe in relation to the rest of the world, therefore they remained unchanged. In 2007, the new design was introduced. The design still retains all elements of the original designs, including the twelve stars, but the map of the fifteen states is replaced by one showing the whole of Europe as a continent, without borders, to stress unity. These coins were not mandatory for existing eurozone members when introduced in 2007, but became so for every member in 2008.

Starting in 2017 the 1, 2, and 5 euro cent coins from individual member states have started adjusting their common side design to a new version, identified by smaller and more rounded numeral and longer lines outside of the stars at the coin's circumference. Starting in 2023 a similar design change started being implemented for the 10, 20, and 50 euro cent coins.

Cyprus is shown several hundred kilometers northwest of its real position in order to include it on the map. On the €1 and €2 coins, the island is shown to be directly east of mainland Greece; on the €0.10, €0.20 and €0.50 coins, it appears directly below Crete. The original proposal from the European Commission was to include Turkey on the map, but this design was rejected by the Council.

==== Initial design ====
The original designs of the 10c, 20c and 50c coins showed the outline of each of the 15 EU member states. Each state was shown as separate from the others, thus giving Europe the appearance of an archipelago. EU member states outside the eurozone (Denmark, Sweden, and the United Kingdom) were also depicted. Non-EU states were not depicted.

On the €1 and €2 coins, the landmass appeared more cohesive although borders were indicated. As in current issues, all coins featured 12 stars in their design.

Researchers from the University of Zürich warned that an external ring of metal surrounding an inner pill of a different colour, as in the euro coins, can lead to the release of high levels of nickel, causing allergic reactions with people sensitive to the metal. The researchers also warned that the coins could contain between 240 and 320 times the amount of nickel allowed under the EU nickel directive.

=== National sides ===
The obverse side varies from state to state, with each member allowed to choose its own design. Each of the eight coins can have the same design (such as Irish coins), or can vary from coin to coin (such as Italian coins), among other possibilities. In monarchies, the national side usually features a portrait of the country's monarch, often in a design carried over from the former currency (e.g. Belgian coins). Republics tend to feature national monuments, symbols, or stylised designs (such as French coins). Engravings on the edge of the €2 coin are also subject to national choice.

There are at present no plans to abolish the national designs in favour of a common European one. However, the Commission has proposed that the 1c, 2c and 5c coins have a common design to keep costs down.

Though they are not members of the EU, Monaco, San Marino, and the Vatican City (and Andorra since 2014) also have euro coins featuring a national side, but a considerable number of these coins were not put into general circulation by the authorities who instead sold them to collectors for prices higher than their face value. Due to this, in 2012, a European Regulation established that: "A minor proportion, not exceeding 5% of the cumulated total net value and volume of circulation coins issued by a Member State, taking into account only years with positive net issuance, may be put on the market above face value if justified by the special quality of the coin, a special packaging or any additional services provided".

No territories associated with eurozone countries issue their own euro coins. France and the Netherlands have overseas regions with their own currencies.

On the coins of Belgium, Finland, France, the Netherlands and Spain, the first year shown is 1999 (when the euro was formally established). On the coins of Monaco, the first date is 2001. As for the coins of the remaining countries (Austria, Germany, Greece, Ireland, Italy, Luxembourg, Portugal, San Marino and the Vatican City), the first year shown is 2002, the year the euro entered circulation.

Since 2026, there are 25 countries (the 21 members of the eurozone and the 4 European microstates mentioned above) issue euro coins with their own national sides, which adds up to a total of 200 different euro coins each year (provided all denominations are issued), not counting commemorative coins or "collector coins".

==== Regulations ====
The basis for the euro coins is derived from a European recommendation from 2003, which allowed changing the national obverse sides of euro coins from 1 January 2004 onwards. However, a number of recommendations and restrictions still apply.

Euro coins must still have a common reverse side, so only the national obverse sides may be varied. Also, the standard national obverse sides per se should not be changed until the end of 2008, unless the head of state depicted on some coins changes before then. (This clause already came into effect for Monaco and the Vatican City, whose heads of state—Rainier III and Pope John Paul II respectively—died in 2005 and whose national obverse sides were changed for 2006).

In 2005, another recommendation added two more guidelines regarding the design of the coins. The state issuing a coin should in some way clearly be identified on the obverse side, either by stating the full name or a clearly identifiable abbreviation of it; and neither name nor the denomination of the coin should be repeated on the obverse, as it is already featured on the common reverse side.

These restrictions do not apply retroactively; only new designs—the national obverse sides for regular issues of states newly joining the euro or of eurozone states which change their design, and €2 commemorative coins issued from 2006 onwards—are subject to them. However, the five countries whose designs violated the first update to the rules (Austria, Belgium, Finland, Germany and Greece) initially were assumed to have to change their design in the future, which Finland did for 2007 and Belgium for 2008.

In 2008, another recommendation changed the rules again:

- The twelve stars of the European Union surrounding the coin designs need to surround the national design, including year marks and the name of the country. The stars have to appear in the same way as they are aligned on the flag of the European Union.
- The design of euro coins may not be changed except for two specific circumstances:
  - If a coin design is in violation of the recommendations, it may be updated to bring it into line with them.
  - If a coin design depicts a head of state, it may be updated:

1. every fifteen years to bring it into line with the head of state's current appearance;
2. if the head of state abdicates or dies. However, temporary heads of state may not be used as a reason for changing the design; instead a €2 commemorative coin (potentially a second €2 commemorative coin) will be allowed to be issued.

Finland and Belgium had already corrected their design on the coins issued to include the initials of the country in 2007 and 2008, respectively. Belgium was forced to change its design back to show the original portrait of its monarch, because the 2008 update to follow the recommendations also updated the portrait, which was against the rules. The Belgian coins from 2009 onwards show the original royal portrait of 1999, but otherwise keep the new 2008 coin design as far as the country identification and year mark are concerned. These provisions additionally prohibit further sede vacante sets of coins by the Vatican City, allowing only commemorative coins for such occasions. Finland and Spain updated their designs to meet the new rules about the stars in 2008 and 2010, respectively.

In 2012, a European Regulation approved new specifications of euro coins and named (in article 1 g) a deadline for national sides of regular coins to be updated to fully comply with the current regulation: 20 June 2062.

- The national side of circulation coins shall not repeat any indication of the denomination, or any parts thereof, of the coin. It shall not repeat the name of the single currency or of its subdivision, unless such indication stems from the use of a different alphabet. However, the edge lettering of the 2-euro coin may include an indication of the denomination, provided that only the figure "2" or the term "euro" in the relevant alphabet, or both, are used.
- The national side of all denominations of circulation coins shall bear an indication of the issuing Member State by means of the Member State's name or an abbreviation of it.
- The national side of circulation coins shall bear a circle of 12 stars that shall fully surround the national design, including the year mark and the indication of the issuing Member State's name. This shall not prevent some design elements from extending into the circle of stars, provided that the stars are all clearly and fully visible. The 12 stars shall be depicted as on the Union flag.
- Changes to the designs used for the national sides of regular coins may only be made once every 15 years, without prejudice to changes necessary to prevent counterfeiting of the currency. Without prejudice of the previous, changes to the designs used for the national sides of regular coins may be made where the Head of State referred to on a coin changes. However, a temporary vacancy or the provisional occupation of the function of Head of State shall not give any additional right to such change.
- Issuing Member States shall update their national sides of regular coins in order to fully comply with this Regulation by 20 June 2062.

In 2014, a new Regulation regarding euro coins was approved. In it, no changes related to what was mentioned above were established.

Initially, Luxembourg, Monaco, the Netherlands and the Vatican City did not comply the specifications in their coins. Following changes in their heads of state and the subsequent changes in the design of their coins (in 2026, 2006, 2014 and 2006, respectively), they began to comply with the specifications.

In 2022, France came to comply with the stars' rule after the design change it made on the 1 and 2 euro coins, in which the year had until then been inserted between the stars of the Union.

As of 2026, Austria, Germany and Greece still have to include an indication of the issuing Member State. Additionally, Greece, Italy and Slovenia have to comply with the rule of the stars. Finally, Austria must eliminate the denominations on the national side of their euro coins.

Bear in mind that the foregoing refers to "regular" coins since, in the case of the 2 euro commemorative coins, the aforementioned is fulfilled in all coins since 2013. This is due to the fact that each one of these coins supposes a variation in the design, while, as mentioned, "regular" coins were not affected unless the design of the national sides was changed, and have until June 20, 2062 in the event that the design had not been changed before.

Finally, the different States must inform each other of their new draft designs (both of "regular" and 2 euro commemorative coins), as well as the European Council and the European Commission, which must give its approval. In one example, the initial design of Andorran 10, 20 and 50 cent coins did not obtain EU approval because the image of the Pantokrator of San Martí de la Cortinada, included in those coins, violated the principle of religious neutrality. The image of the religious figure was eliminated in the final Andorran coin design. The principle of religious neutrality isn't always strictly enforced, however; the designs for the standard circulation €1- and €2-euro coins of Bulgaria feature two saints from the Eastern Orthodox Church. Another example, the 2 euro commemorative coins that Belgium planned to issue in 2015 on the 200th anniversary of the Battle of Waterloo, caused complaints by France and withdrawal of the design. However, Belgium did issue a 2.50 euro collector's coin, taking advantage of the fact that these coins are not submitted to the draft design approval.

=== Security features ===
Euro coins have high-security machine-readable features. Sophisticated bi-metal and sandwich technologies have been put into the €1 and €2 coins. The 10c, 20c and 50c coins are made of Nordic gold, which is a unique alloy, difficult to melt and used exclusively for coins. The lettering on the edge of the €2 coin also protects it from counterfeiting.

=== Features for persons with impaired sight ===
Euro coins were designed in cooperation with organisations representing blind people, and as a result incorporate many features allowing them to be distinguished by touch alone. In addition, their visual appearance is designed to make them easy to tell apart for persons who cannot read the inscriptions on the coins.

The coins increase in size and weight with value. Of the eight denominations of euro coins, the three lowest denominations are small, resemble copper in colour and are quite thin and light. The next three denominations resemble gold in colour and are thicker as well as heavier. The highest two denominations are bimetallic, being generally larger and thicker than the lower denominations.

In general, the greater the value, the heavier and larger the coin. Copper colour identifies low value; gold colour identifies medium value; two different metals identify high value.

There are also differences within each group. The 2 cent coin has a grooved edge to distinguish it from the 1 and 5 cent coins and also from the US penny, which has the same colour and diameter. Similarly, the 20 cent coin edge is smooth with seven indents to distinguish it from the 10 and 50 cent coins.

While currencies predating the euro were specifically designed in similar ways (different sizes, colours, and ridges) to aid the visually impaired, the euro was the first to have authorities consult organisations representing the blind and visually impaired before the release of the currency.

== Commemorative issues ==
=== 2 euro commemorative coins ===
Each state may also mint two 2 euro commemorative coins each year from June 2012. From 2004 to May 2012, countries were only allowed to mint one coin per year. Only €2 coins may be used in this way (for them to be legal tender) and there is a limit on the number that can be issued. The coin must adhere to the normal design criteria, such as the twelve stars, the year and the issuing country.

Greece was the first country to issue a 2 euro commemorative coin, and was followed by other countries. In 2007, every eurozone state participated in the Treaty of Rome programme, in which all member states issued a coin of similar design to commemorate the signing of the Treaty, only differing in the name of the issuing country and language of the text. This was also the case in 2009, in commemoration of the tenth anniversary of the Economic and Monetary Union. The design was selected by electronic voting by EU citizens. In 2012, a common commemorative coin was issued to commemorate the tenth anniversary of euro coins and banknotes. In 2015, a common commemorative coin was issued to commemorate 30 years of the European Union flag. Finally, in 2022 a common commemorative coin was issued to commemorate 35 years of the Erasmus Programme.

In 2006, Germany began issuing a series of coins, the German Bundesländer series, showing each of the states of Germany on its coins; It was originally intended to run until 2021, but one extra issue was added in 2019, which pushed back the last three planned issues (2019, 2020, 2021) by one year. The series ended in 2022. In 2023 a new series (Bundesländer series II) began until 2038. Furthermore, a series called Unity, Justice and Freedom began in 2025.

Spain started a commemorative coin series Patrimonio de la Humanidad de la UNESCO (UNESCO World Heritage) in 2010, commemorating all of Spain's UNESCO World Heritage Sites, which is currently planned until 2058. The order in which the coin for a specific site is issued coincides with the order in which they were declared a UNESCO World Heritage site.

In 2021, France started a 2 euro commemorative coin series about 2024 Summer Olympics. It finished in 2024.

As of 2025, Croatia, Estonia, Latvia, Lithuania, Luxembourg, and Malta have also issued series of 2 euro commemorative coins.

=== Gold and silver commemorative issues ("collector coins") ===
A legacy of old national practice is the minting of silver and gold commemorative coins.

Unlike normal issues, these coins are not legal tender throughout the eurozone, but only in the country where they are issued (e.g. a €10 Finnish commemorative coin cannot be used in Portugal).

However, these gold coins are intended for collectors as their bullion value vastly exceeds their face value. Some silver coins, such as the German €10 commemoratives, are often available at banks and some retailers at face value. These coins, however, generally do not circulate but are kept by collectors.

Andorra, Monaco, San Marino, and the Vatican City also issue this kind of coins.

The "collector coins" also include rare cases of bimetal collector coins, such as titanium and niobium.

==== Belgian 2.50 euro coin ====
In 2015, Belgium issued a 2.50 euro commemorative coin which is legal tender inside the country. 70,000 coins were minted, commemorating the 200th anniversary of Napoleon's defeat in the Battle of Waterloo.

Belgium originally planned to mint 2 euro commemorative coins for the occasion. This plan was blocked by France, however (after 180,000 of the coins had already been minted; they had to be discarded). Minting the 2.50 euro denomination obviated France's complaints as the coins are not legal tender in the European Union, only in Belgium.

EU law states that any country can issue any new coins it wants as long as they are in an irregular denomination, so it invented a €2.50 coin.

== Circulation ==
The European Central Bank closely monitors the circulation and stock of the euro coins and banknotes. It is a task of the Eurosystem to ensure an efficient and smooth supply of euro coins and to maintain their integrity throughout the eurozone.

=== Statistics ===
As of December 2021, there are approximately 141 billion coins in circulation around the eurozone. In contrast, the United States has minted over 300 billion pennies since 1983 when the current copper-plated zinc metallic composition began. Using a population of 341.9 million for the euro area, that is roughly 199 coins of denomination 1c or 2c per capita, and 215 other coins per capita.

Statistical data valid December 2021
| Denomination | Coins in circulation | Share | Value in € | Share |
|---|---|---|---|---|
| 1c | 38,120,000,000 | 27.00% | 381,200,000.00 | 1.22% |
| 2c | 29,680,000,000 | 21.02% | 593,600,000.00 | 1.90% |
| 5c | 23,036,000,000 | 16.32% | 1,151,800,000.00 | 3.69% |
| 10c | 16,248,000,000 | 11.51% | 1,624,800,000.00 | 5.20% |
| 20c | 12,725,000,000 | 9.01% | 2,545,000,000.00 | 8.15% |
| 50c | 6,711,000,000 | 4.75% | 3,355,500,000.00 | 10.74% |
| 1€ | 7,747,000,000 | 5.49% | 7,747,000,000.00 | 24.81% |
| 2€ | 6,916,000,000 | 4.90% | 13,832,000,000.00 | 44.29% |
| Total | 141,183,000,000 | 100.00% | 31,230,900,000.00 | 100.00% |

=== Counterfeiting ===
Approximately 100,000 counterfeit euro coins are taken from circulation annually, and roughly the same number are seized before they can be released. Given a total circulation of 56 billion coins, counterfeit coins are relatively rare. About half the counterfeits feature the German national design, but counterfeits have been detected for every issuing country. The majority of counterfeit coins are €2 (60% in 2011), with most of the rest being €1, and a few 50c coins. The number of counterfeit €2 coins being found annually is decreasing, while numbers of counterfeit €1 and 50-cent coins are increasing.

Total amount of counterfeit coins seized from circulation
| Year | Pre-circulation | Circulation | Source |
|---|---|---|---|
| 2017 | 31,059 | 160,914 | |
| 2016 | 77,084 | 150,258 | |
| 2015 | 20 | 146,889 | |
| 2014 | 301,970 | 192,195 | |
| 2013 | 31,051 | 177,600 | |
| 2012 | 184,000 | | |
| 2011 | 157,000 | | |
| 2010 | 186,000 | | |
| 2009 | 172,100 | | |
| 2008 | 195,900 | | |
| 2007 | 211,100 | | |
| 2006 | 163,800 | | |
| 2005 | 100,500 | | |
| 2004 | 74,564 | | |
| 2003 | 26,191 | | |
| 2002 | 2,336 | | |

The European Technical and Scientific Centre (ETSC) estimates that up to 2 million counterfeit coins were put into circulation in 2002.

Recent investigations by the European Commission have shown that counterfeit sophistication is increasing, making prompt detection more difficult. In 2008, Irish MEP Eoin Ryan called for tighter regulation over tokens and medals that are being increasingly used for small purchases mainly in vending machines across Europe.

== Small-denomination coins ==
The 1c, 2c, and 5c coins account for approximately 80% of all new coins minted in the eurozone. Due to the expense of producing such low-value coinage, the Commission and some member states have proposed that costs could be cut by having a common design on both sides of these coins, rather than minting numerous different designs.

The €1 and €2 coins are two-toned. The "gold" is an alloy, 75% copper, 20% zinc and 5% nickel. The "silver" is cupronickel, 75% copper and 25% nickel. The 10c, 20c and 50c coins are a proprietary alloy known as "Nordic Gold", consisting of 89% copper, 5% aluminium, 5% zinc and 1% tin. The 1c, 2c, and 5c coins are copper-coated steel fourrées. The copper alloys make the coinage antimicrobial.

=== Price rounding ===
Raw data
Percentage of people in favour of abolishing the use of the 1- and 2-euro cent coins.

The 1c and 2c coins were initially introduced to ensure that the introduction of the euro was not used as an excuse by retailers to heavily round up prices. However, due to the cost of maintaining a circulation of low-value coins, both by business and the mints, Belgium, Finland, Ireland, Italy, the Netherlands, Slovakia and Estonia round prices to the nearest five cents (Swedish rounding) if paying with cash, while producing only a handful of those coins for collectors, rather than general circulation. The coins are still legal tender and produced outside these states.

==== Countries with Swedish rounding ====
The Swedish rounding law in Finland was issued in January 2002, shortly after the coins were put into circulation.

The Netherlands followed suit in September 2004, under pressure from retail businesses, which claimed that dealing with 1- and 2-cent coins was too expensive. After a successful experiment in the town of Woerden in May 2004, retailers across the Netherlands were permitted in September 2004 to round cash transactions to the nearest five cents.

In Belgium, rounding has been common practice since 2014; by law, rounding has been obligatory for cash purchases since 1 December 2019. For payments with debit or credit cards, the merchant can choose whether to apply rounding but has to inform the client beforehand. With the obligatory rounding in effect, Belgium's National Bank has stopped production of 1- and 2-cent coins.

Ireland introduced rounding in 2015 after a 2013 trial in Wexford.

In May 2017, the Italian parliament passed a resolution to stop minting 1c and 2c coins starting 1 January 2018 and to introduce Swedish rounding.

The withdrawal of low-circulation coins is due in part to rising metal prices: De Nederlandsche Bank calculated it would save $36 million a year by not using the smaller coins. Other countries such as Germany favoured retaining the coins due to their desire for €1.99 prices, which appear more attractive to the consumer than a €2 price. According to James Debono writing for Malta Today, "scrapping the coins is considered unthinkable for Germany where both consumers and retailers are obsessed with precise pricing." Luxembourg and Malta also declared that they do not wish to remove the coins. This is echoed by the European Central Bank which supports the coins, stating it allows businesses to calculate prices more exactly to attract consumers, such as €0.99.

According to a 2005 Eurobarometer survey of EU citizens, Germans were most sceptical about the removal of the 1c and 2c coins from complete circulation in the eurozone, but on average a majority of Germans still supported their removal (58% for the one cent coin and 52% for the two cent coin in 2005). The Belgians were most supportive of their removal. A similar survey in 2017 found 64% across the eurozone favoring their removal with prices rounded, with over 70% in Belgium, Ireland, Italy, the Netherlands and Slovakia. Only Portugal and Latvia had a plurality in favour of retaining the coins (49% against removal, 45–46% in favour). The same survey in 2021 found that 67% of respondents across the eurozone were in favor of the removal, and all countries in the eurozone showed a plurality of people also in favour.

The Commission in 2010 released its guidelines on daily life euro cash questions, to give citizens guidelines on issues with direct implications for daily life. The guidelines were based on ten guiding principles, including two that still remain: "No surcharges should be imposed on payments in cash" and "Member States should not adopt new rounding rules to the nearest five cent". Following a consultation, a Commission initiative considering the adoption of price rounding was due to be adopted by the end of 2021. Regardless of the Commission's decision, Slovakia proposed introducing rounding from 2022.

== Controversy ==
In spring 2016, controversy arose in the Netherlands after an episode of the television program Keuringsdienst van Waarde showed that euro coins for the Netherlands and other countries were being made by South Korean company Poongsan, a known producer of cluster munitions. Cluster munitions are banned internationally by the 2008 Convention on Cluster Munitions (CCM), because of their indiscriminate and long-term effects on civilians. The CCM prohibits the use, production, stockpiling or transfer of cluster munitions as well as assistance with these acts. After parliamentary questions were posed, the Dutch government stated that the Royal Dutch Mint had ordered around 40 million 'coin blanks' between 2011 and 2016, and that Poongsan was on a list of vetted suppliers of the European Commission's Mint Directors Working Group. Since then, both the Royal Dutch Mint and the Norwegian Mint have excluded Poongsan as a coin blank supplier due to its involvement with cluster munitions. Questions were also raised that year in the European Parliament about Poongsan's presence on the vetted list of coin blank suppliers of the European Commission's Mint Directors Working Group. The Commission responded with claims that, despite the European Union's support of the CCM, the EU itself is not a party to it and responsibility on the issue lies with EU member states.
