= Yvette Gastauer-Claire =

Luxembourgish sculptor

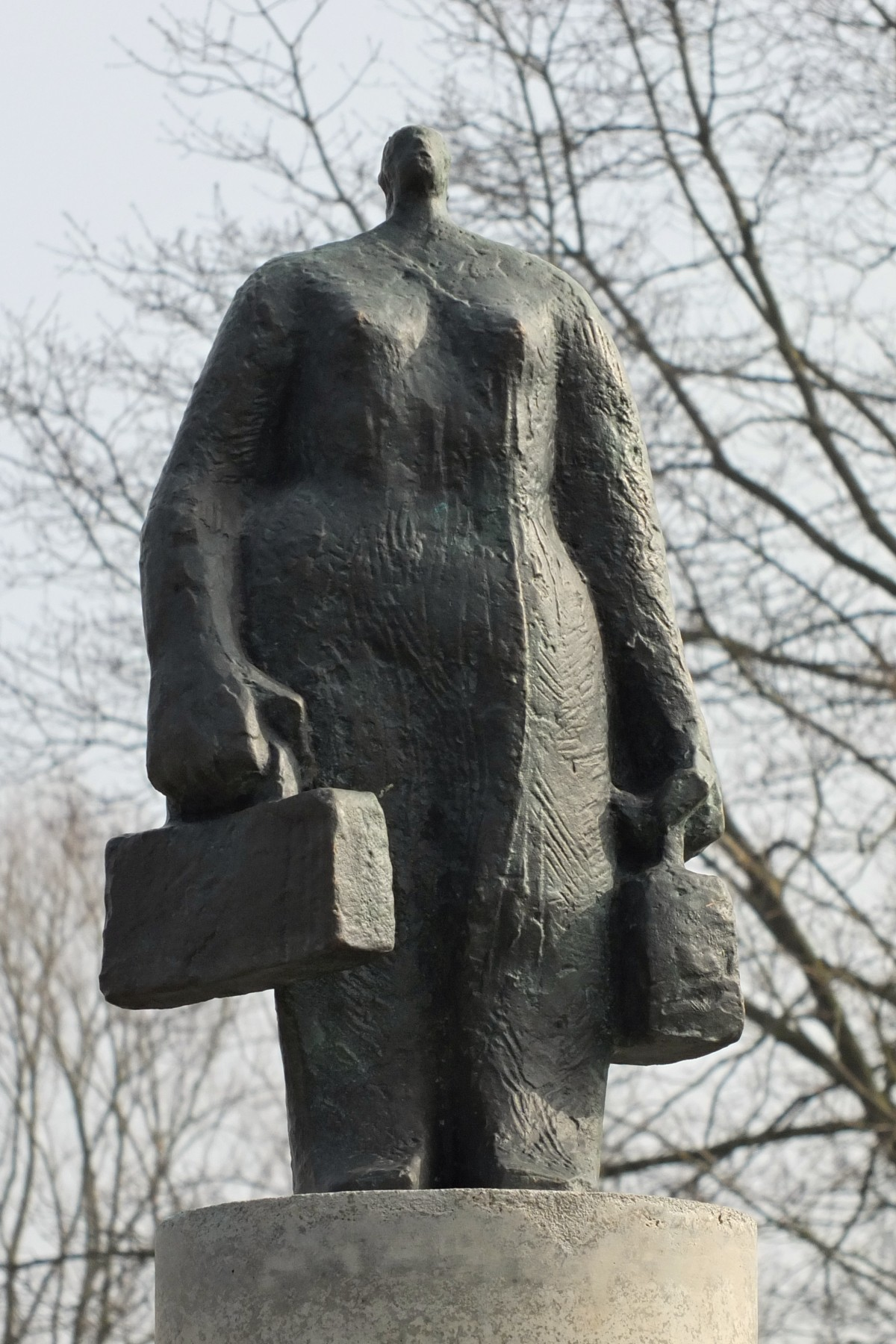
Die Reisende (The Woman Traveller), sculpture by Yvette Gastauer-Claire in Holzbüttgen, Germany

Yvette Gastauer-Claire (born 1957) is a Luxembourgish sculptor and medallist who has designed coins for Luxembourg, including euros. Her sculptures can be seen in buildings and parks in Luxembourg and the surroundings.

== Biography ==
Born in 1957 in Esch-sur-Alzette, Yvette Gastauer-Claire studied art at the École des Arts et Métiers, Luxembourg (1974–1979). Thereafter she served an apprenticeship under the sculptor Camille Nocher. From 1980 to 1984, she worked for Luxembourg's national museums in the restoration department. She has carried out restoration work for Luxembourg monuments working in a private modelling studio.

In addition to giving sculpture courses for adults, she has taught weak-sighted children at Luxembourg's Institut pour Déficients Visuels. She lives in Schifflange where she has her own studio. Gastauer-Claire has participated in group exhibitions in Luxembourg, Germany, France and Belgium, and since 1985 has exhibited with FIDEM. She held her first solo exhibition in Dudelange in 1995.

As a medallist, she has received numerous commissions from the Caisse d'Épargne de l'État, including a series of medals to commemorate the millennium of Saint Michael's Church, Luxembourg in 1987.

Gastauer-Claire's coin designs are described in her Livret d'artiste autour de l'Euro. It includes commemorative coins as well as her euro coins: 1 cent, 2 cents, 5 cents, 10 cents, 20 cents, 50 cents, 1 euro and 2 euros.
