= Royal Mint of Belgium =

Government coin producer of Belgium

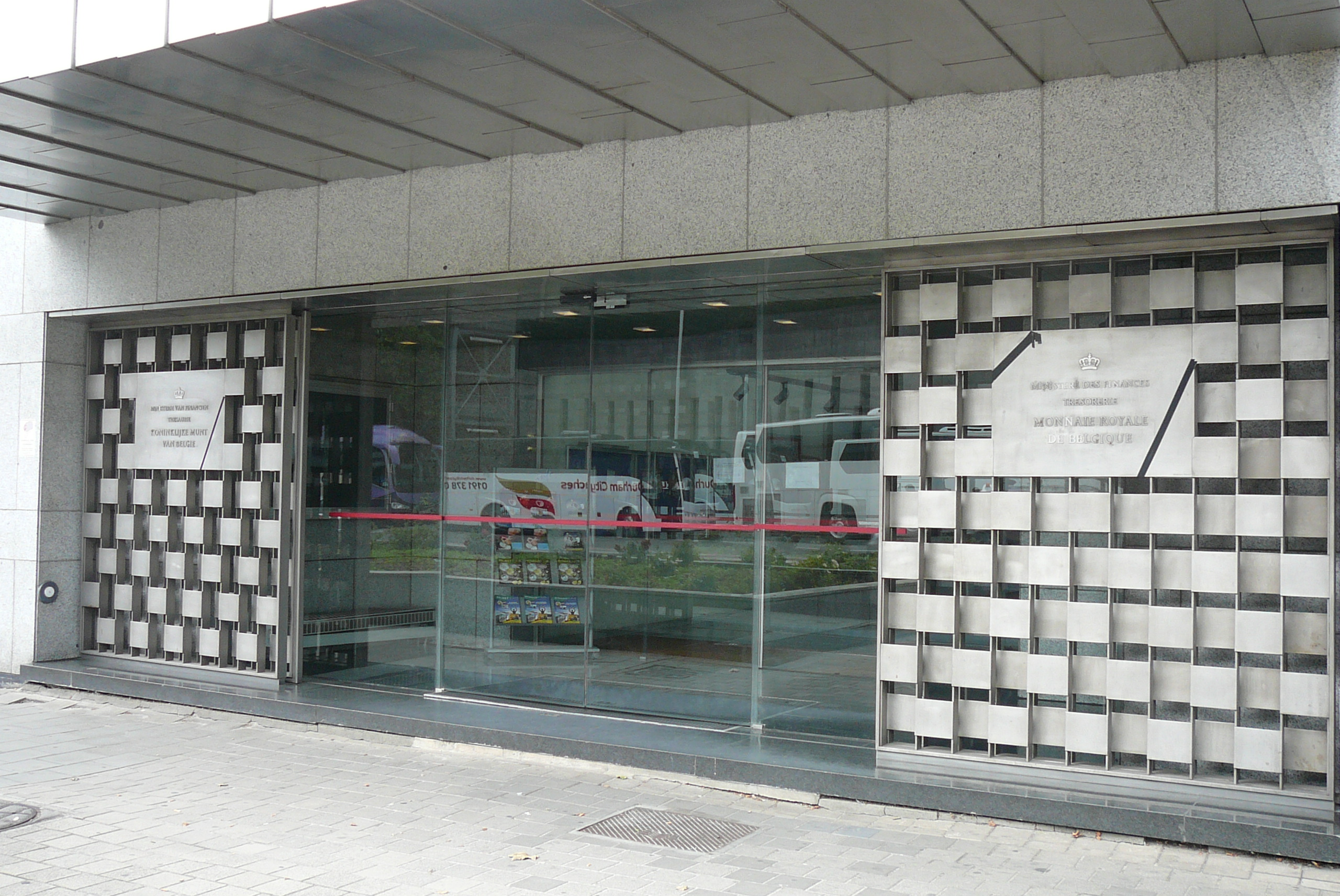
Seat of the Royal Mint of Belgium, Boulevard Pachéco - Pachecolaan 32, 1000 Brussels

The Royal Mint of Belgium (French: La Monnaie Royale de Belgique; Dutch: De Koninklijke Munt van België) based in Brussels was responsible for minting all official coins of Kingdom of Belgium from 1832 to 2017. As of 2018, the mint's building still exists but no longer strikes coins and is under the purview of the Belgian Administration of the Treasury.

Since 1 January 2002, when Belgium adopted the euro as their only official legal tender, Belgium had been minting their own euro coins until it was announced in August 2017 that the mint would be shutting down. The mint began selling its machinery and its remaining stock of collectible coins through the end of 2017. Belgian Euro coins are now minted in the Netherlands and are distributed by the National Bank of Belgium.
