= Heikki Häiväoja =

Finnish sculptor and coin designer (1929–2019)

Heikki Aulis Häiväoja (May 25, 1929 in Jämsä, Finland — September 15, 2019 in Kauniainen), was a Finnish sculptor and designer of the Finnish euro coins design for the minor and middle series of coins. All designs feature the 12 stars of the EU and the year of imprint on one side, and a national design on the other: The heraldic Finnish lion in a new version designed by the Heikki Häiväoja.
