= Belgian euro coins =

Designs of Belgian currency

Belgian euro coins feature only a single design for all eight coins: the portrait or effigy of the King of the Belgians. Previously, all Belgian euros depicted King Albert II and his royal monogram. Current coins depict King Philippe. Also part of the design by Jan Alfons Keustermans are the 12 stars of the EU and the year of imprint.

In 2017, the Royal Mint of Belgium ceased to strike coins. Since 2018, the Royal Dutch Mint has minted all Belgian euro coins.

== Belgian euro design ==
For images of the common side and a detailed description of the coins, see euro coins.

The first sets of euro coins were minted in 1999 and the euro was put into circulation in the eurozone in 2002. Like Finland, France, the Netherlands and Spain, the first euro coins of Belgium are marked 1999, not 2002.

=== Reign of Albert II ===
==== First series (1999–2007) ====
Belgian euro coins dated 1999–2007 have the portrait of King Albert II.

Prior to 2007, the old common side showing national borders was used, but the 2007 coins used the new common side without borders.

There are no signature marks or mint marks on both these types of coins.

Depiction of Belgian euro coinage (1999–2007) | Obverse side
€ 0.01	€ 0.02	€ 0.05
Effigy and monogram of King Albert II
€ 0.10	€ 0.20	€ 0.50
Effigy and monogram of King Albert II
€ 1.00	€ 2.00	€ 2 Coin Edge
		for a total of 12 stars
Effigy and monogram of King Albert II		for a total of 12 stars

==== Second series (2008) ====
In order to conform to the common guidelines on the design of national faces of coins, Belgium updated the design of the Belgian national face of euro coins to be produced from 2008. Coins from previous years featuring the old Belgian national face remain valid.

The changes are:

- The coin's inner section shows an effigy of King Albert II in profile facing to the left.
- To the right of this, the royal monogram is displayed and, below it, the indication of the country ‘BE’.
- Underneath the effigy, the signature mark of the Master of the Mint is displayed on the left and the mint mark on the right, either side of the year.
- The outer ring of the coin depicts the twelve stars of the European flag only.

As from 2007, the Belgian euro coins also adopted the new common map like the rest of the eurozone countries. A proportion of the Belgian 2 euro coins -common part, the map looks smooth, whereas, the same map on the euros coming from other eurozone countries is dotted.

Belgium is the second state in the EMU, after Finland, to, from 2008 on, change the design of their standard circulation euro coins in accordance with recommendations defined by the Economic and Financial Affairs Council of the European Union.

Depiction of Belgian euro coinage (2008) | Obverse side
€ 0.01	€ 0.02	€ 0.05
Effigy and monogram of King Albert II
€ 0.10	€ 0.20	€ 0.50
Effigy and monogram of King Albert II
€ 1.00	€ 2.00	€ 2 Coin Edge
		for a total of 12 stars
Effigy and monogram of King Albert II		for a total of 12 stars

==== Amendment (2009-2013) ====
The 2008 portrait did not comply with previous decisions by the ECOFIN in 2005 and 2008. Therefore, an amendment was made, which reverted to the portrait of Albert II found in the first series. Mint marks, year and stars remain the same. Some collectors consider this as a third series but since unlike all series it was not published in the official journal of the European Union, it is actually an amendment and not a new series.

=== Reign of Philippe ===
==== Third series (2014–present) ====
Following the accession of King Philippe after the abdication of Albert II, new distinctive sides were added depicting the new monarch.

Coins with the new obverse were struck from 4 February 2014. The obverses were designed by Luc Luycx.

Depiction of Belgian euro coinage (2014–present) | Obverse side
€ 0.01	€ 0.02	€ 0.05
Effigy and monogram of King Philippe
€ 0.10	€ 0.20	€ 0.50
Effigy and monogram of King Philippe
€ 1.00	€ 2.00	€ 2 Coin Edge
		for a total of 12 stars
Effigy and monogram of King Philippe		for a total of 12 stars

== Circulating mintage quantities ==
The following table shows the mintage quantity for all Belgian euro coins issued into circulation, per denomination, per year.

Face Value	€0,01	€0,02	€0,05	€0,10	€0,20	€0,50	€1,00	€2,00
1999	235,250,387	s	300,050,387	181,000,387	s	197,050,387	160,050,387	s
2000	s	337,050,388	s	s	181,050,388	s	s	120,050,388
2001	99,850,388	s	s	145,800,388	s	s	s	s
2002	s	s	s	s	104,147,866	50,147,866	84,647,866	50,147,866
2003	10,197,966	40,197,966	30,197,966	s	30,197,966	s	6,197,966	30,197,966
2004	180,073,262	159,323,262	80,073,262	20,073,262	70,073,262	15,073,262	15,073,262	60,073,262
2005	s	s	110,056,018	10,056,018	10,056,018	s	s	10,533,006
2006	15,050,018	30,050,018	35,050,018	s	40,050,018	s	s	20,050,018
2007	60,057,006	70,057,006	s	s	25,117,287	5,057,006	s	35,042,006
2008	s	s	s	s	20,062,506	25,042,506	5,042,506	20,042,506
2009	19.991.006	10.041.006	s	s	30.141.006	30.041.006	10.041.006	10.041.006
2010	30,143,850	20,043,850	25,043,850	20,043,850	15,093,850	s	s	15,043,850
2011	10,018,850	s	25,043,850	25,043,850	40,293,850	15,043,850	15,043,850	32,043,850
2012	19.983.850	15.033.850	22.533.850	25,033.850	42,383.850	30,033.850	10,033.850	s
2013	70,025,500	32,650,500	17,025,500	5,025,500	s	s	s	s
2014	s	3,199,109	14,574,109	s	s	10,074,109	s	s
2015	14,921,367	21,921,367	10,046,367	11,046,367	s	10,046,367	s	s
2016	28,902,160	17,027,160	28,527,160	s	s	2,027,160	s	s
2017	1,657,942	s	48,467,942	3,023,442	s	5,023,442	s	s
2018	s	s	5,347,750	12,347,750	s	s	s	s
2019	s	s	10,029,000	5,029,000	21,029,000	12,029,000	s	3,229,000
2020	s	s	s	s	s	s	s	s
2021	s	s	s	s	s	s	s	s
2022	s	s	34,913,500	s	s	s	s	s
2023	s	s	9,000,000	7,500,000	17,000,000	s	s	s
s Small quantities minted for sets only

== Identifying marks ==
National Identifier	"BE" (Note: As applied to the 2008 amended design onward.)
Mint Mark	(2005–2017), (Note: Prior to 2008, Belgian mark had only been used on commemorative issues. Since 2008, the mark is used on both standard issue and commemorative issue coins.) (2018–present)
Engravers Initials	None
€2 Edge inscription	

== €2 commemorative coins ==
Year	Subject	Volume

== Other commemorative coins (collectors' coins) ==
Belgium has a good collection of euro commemorative coins, solely in silver and gold. Their face values range from 2.5 euros to 100 euros. This is mainly done as a legacy of old national practice of minting gold and silver coins. These coins are not really intended to be used as means of payment, so generally they do not circulate.

== See also ==
- Adoption of the euro in Belgium
