= Luc Luycx =

Designer of the common side of euro coins

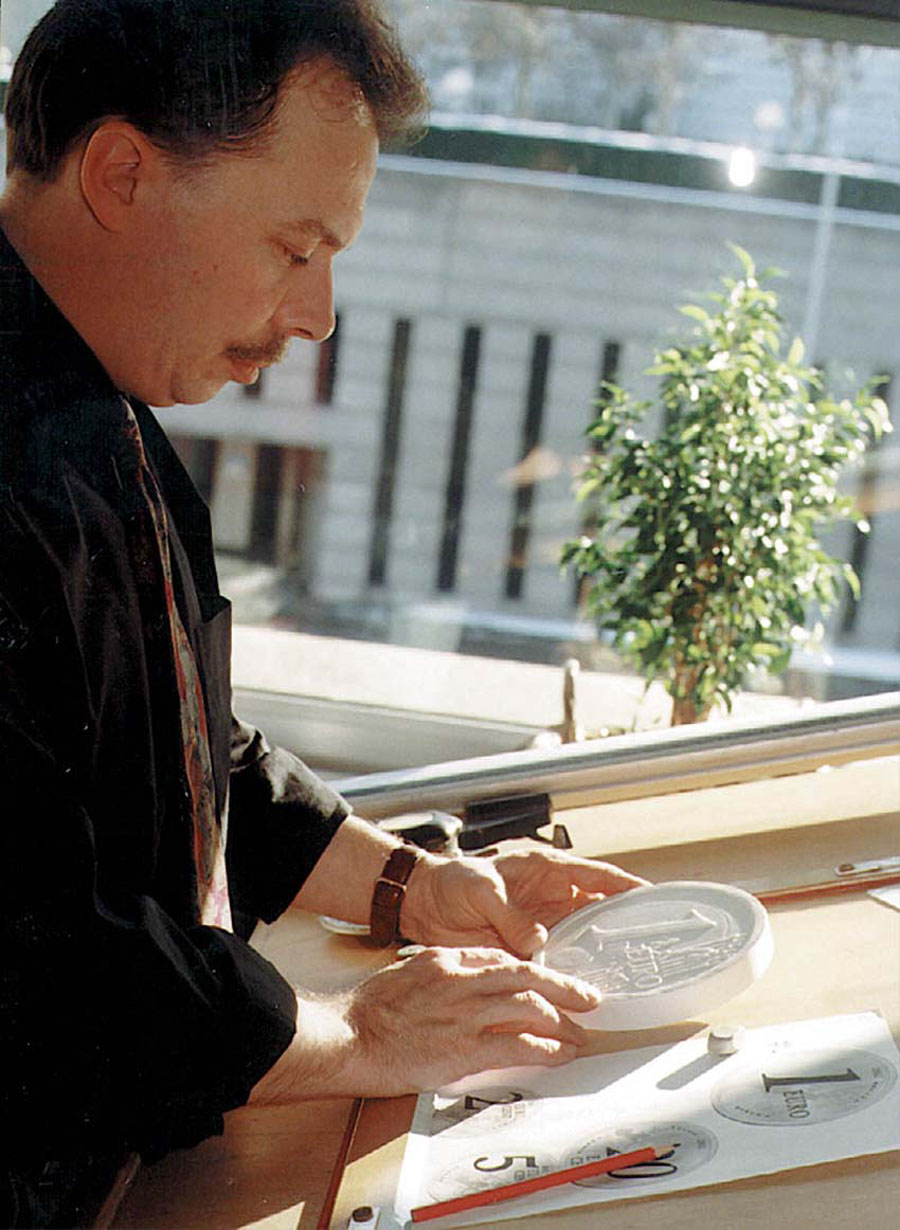
- Born: 11 April 1958 (age 67); Aalst, Belgium
- Known for: Designer of the common side of the euro coins

Luc Luycx (Dutch pronunciation: [lyk ˈlœyks]; born 11 April 1958) is the designer of the common side of the euro coins.

Luycx is a computer engineer and medallist. He was born in Aalst, Belgium and now lives in Dendermonde. Luycx worked for the Royal Belgian Mint designing coins. He won a competition and designed the euro coins in 1996. His signature on all euro coins is visible as two L letters connected together (LL). On the 1-euro as well as on the 2-euro coin, this is visible under the O of the word EURO on the common side.

== See also ==
- Euro
- Robert Kalina
