= Portuguese euro coins =

Designs of Portuguese currency

Portuguese euro coins show three different designs for each of the three series of coins. However, they are quite similar in that all of them contain old Portuguese royal mints and seals within a circle of seven castles and five escutcheons with silver bezants (all similar to what can be seen in the coat of arms and flag of Portugal) and the word "Portugal". Also featured in the designs, all done by Vítor Manuel Fernandes dos Santos, are the 12 stars of the EU and the year of minting.

== Portuguese euro design ==
Depiction of Portuguese euro coinage | Obverse side
€0.01	€0.02	€0.05
The royal seal of 1134
€0.10	€0.20	€0.50
The royal seal of 1142
€1.00	€2.00	€2 Coin Edge
		The edge lettering features the seven castles and five coats of arms also found on the national side
The royal seal of 1144		The edge lettering features the seven castles and five coats of arms also found on the national side

== Circulating mintage quantities ==
Face Value	€0.01	€0.02	€0.05	€0.10	€0.20	€0.50	€1.00	€2.00
2002	278,106,172	324,376,590	234,512,047	220,289,835	147,411,038	151,947,133	100,228,135	61,930,775
2003	s	s	s	6,332,000	9,493,600	10,353,000	16,206,875	5,979,750
2004	75,000,000	1,000,000	40,000,000	1,000,000	1,000,000	1,000,000	20,000,000	1,000,000
2005	40,000,000	10,000,000	30,000,000	1,000,000	25,000,000	1,000,000	20,000,000	1,000,000
2006	30,000,000	1,000,000	20,000,000	1,000,000	20,000,000	1,000,000	20,000,000	1,000,000
2007	105,000,000	10,000,000	25,000,000	s	s	s	4,935,400	s
2008	75,000,000	35,000,000	25,000,000	1,000,000	1,000,000	5,000,000	5,000,000	s
2009	60,000,000	45,000,000	25,000,000	10,000,000	20,000,000	20,000,000	20,000,000	s
2010	15,000,000	10,000,000	5,000,000	s	5,000,000	20,000,000	20,000,000	s
2011	20,000,000	30,000,000	25,000,000	s	10,000,000	s	5,000,000	s
2012	50,000,000	35,000,000	15,000,000	s	s	s	s	s
2013	s	s	s	s	s	s	s	s
2014	20,000,000	20,000,000	s	s	s	s	9,000,000	s
2015	40,000,000	20,000,000	s	s	15,000,000	20,000,000	15,000,000	s
2016	40,000,000	15,000,000	15,000,000	15,000,000	25,000,000	2,000,000	35,000,000	s
2017	55,000,000	35,000,000	25,000,000	25,000,000	30,000,000	30,000,000	20,000,000	s
2018	s	s	37,545,200	19,304,000	15,000,000	s	25,000,000	s
2019	50,000,000	s	30,000,000	20,000,000	s	10,000,000	4,000,000	s
2020	50,000,000	s	15,000,000	s	15,000,000	s	30,000,000	s
2021	s	s	15,000,000	15,000,000	10,000,000	20,000,000	s	s
2022	s	s	s	s	s	s	s	s
2023	55,000,000	s	40,000,000	s	s	s	s	15,000,000
s Small quantities minted for sets only

== Identifying marks ==
National Identifier	"PORTUGAL"
Mint Mark	INCM
Engravers Initials	VS (stylised)
€2 Edge inscription	

== €2 commemorative coins ==
Year	Subject	Volume

50th Anniversary of the Signature of the Treaty of Rome (2007)
