= Irish euro coins =

Designs of Irish currency

Irish 1 euro coin obverse side

Irish euro coins all share the same design by Jarlath Hayes, that of the harp, a traditional symbol for Ireland since the Middle Ages, based on that of the Brian Boru harp, housed in Trinity College Dublin. The same harp is used as on the official seals of the Taoiseach, and government ministers and the seal of the president of Ireland. The coins' design also features the 12 stars of the EU, the year of issue and the Irish name for Ireland, "Éire", in a traditional Gaelic script.

== Irish euro design ==
All Irish euro coins bear the same design on their obverse side: a Celtic harp based on the Trinity College Harp, flanked to the left and right by the word "ÉIRE" (Irish for Ireland) and the year the coin was struck, written in Gaelic type. These in turn are surrounded by the 12 stars of the flag of Europe. On the one-euro coin the stars appear on the gold coloured surround with the harp and words in the silver coloured centre. The colours are in the reverse for the two euro coin.

== Circulating mintage quantities ==
The following table shows the mintage quantity for all Irish euro coins, per denomination, per year.

Face Value	€0.01	€0.02	€0.05	€0.10	€0.20	€0.50	€1.00	€2.00
2002	404 365 000	354 665 000	456 295 000	275 935 000	234 605 000	144 165 000	135 165 000	90 615 000
2003	77 965 000	177 355 000	48 415 000	133 885 000	57 205 000	11 875 000	2 585 000	2 695 000
2004	174 870 000	143 040 000	82 370 000	36 810 000	32 460 000	6 790 000	1 670 000	3 780 000
2005	128 600 000	74 700 000	56 560 000	7 200 000	40 540 000	17 360 000	6 870 000	13 520 000
2006	110 970 000	26 590 000	89 810 000	9 640 000	10 400 000	7 500 000	4 040 000	5 120 000
2007	163 800 000	200 940 000	136 210 000	76 990 000	34 470 000	8 680 000	5 700 000	7 410 000
2008	46 150 000	35 830 000	61 900 000	56 560 000	46 000 000	1 220 000	2 590 000	6 110 000
2009	52 200 000	44 280 000	11 330 000	11 770 000	5 420 000	2 930 000	3 320 000	1 040 000
2010	10 940 000	3 490 000	1 010 000	1 070 000	1 020 000	1 160 000	1 070 000	1 460 000
2011	40 970 000	4 720 000	1 010 000	940 000	1 160 000	1 080 000	1 080 000	1 040 000
2012	61 392 000	11 932 000	1 042 000	1 082 000	992 000	1 012 000	1 032 000	8 784 000
2013	61 479 000	34 814 000	1 057 000	951 000	1 299 000	975 000	973 000	1 065 000
2014	35 143 000	3 124 000	1 067 000	1 092 000	1 195 000	1 079 000	989 000	5 318 000
2015	**41 000**	**41 000**	1 101 000	9 061 000	1 121 000	1 131 000	1 091 000	1 182 323
2016	214 000	164 000	84 000	2 284 000	84 000	84 000	84 000	10 679 000
2017	17 170	17 120	790 980	197 255	17 115	17 260	92 300	92 730
2018	25 980	25 990	30 072 180	185 800	126 030	85 990	85 710	89 440
2019	**9 000**	**9 000**	30 009 000	10 009 000	**9 000**	**9 000**	**9 000**	**9 000**
2020	10 000	10 221	44 992 107	10 296	85 100	85 100	**70 000**	86 500
**Bold** - Small quantities minted for sets only.

== Identifying marks ==
National Identifier	"ÉIRE" (in Gaelic type)
Mint Mark	None
Engravers Initials	None
€2 Edge inscription	

== €2 commemorative coins ==
Year	Subject	Volume

Limited release in 2010, featuring an Irish hunter horse and foal.

Limited release in 2011, featuring a salmon and smolt.

Limited release in 2012, featuring an Irish wolfhound and pup.

Wide release (in common with all Euro nations) in 2007, commemorating the 50th anniversary of the Treaty of Rome.

Wide release (in common with all Euro nations) in 2009, commemorating the 10th anniversary of the Economic and Monetary Union.

Wide release (in common with all Euro nations) in 2012, commemorating the 10th anniversary of the euro coins and banknotes.

Wide release (in common with all Euro nations) in 2015, commemorating the 30th anniversary of adoption of the European flag by the European Economic Community.

Wide release in 2016, with the figure of Hibernia on top of the Dublin G.P.O. Building, commemorating the centenary of the Easter Rising.

Wide release in 2019, commemorating the centenary of the First Dáil.

Commemorative €2 in 2023, commemorating 50 Years of Ireland's E.U. membership.

== Usage of 1 cent and 2 cent coins ==
As 1c and 2c coins are of comparatively low value, a National Payments Plan prepared by the Central Bank of Ireland approved by the Government in April 2013 plans "to trial the use of a rounding convention in a pilot project in a mid-size Irish town", with the 1c and 2c no longer being minted while remaining legal tender. The cost of producing a 1 cent coin is 1.65c and the cost of producing a 2 cent coin is 1.94c.

Beginning on Wednesday 28 October 2015 Ireland followed The Netherlands, Sweden, Finland, Denmark, Hungary and, in introducing so-called Swedish rounding. While individual prices are still shown and summed up with 1-cent precision, the total sum is then rounded to the nearest 5 cents when paying with cash. Sums ending in 1, 2, 6 and 7 cents are rounded down; sums ending in 3, 4, 8 and 9 cents are rounded up.

The 1 cent and 2 cent coins remain legal tender, and rounding is voluntary for both the customer and retailer, the Central Bank of Ireland advises "for Rounding to happen, both the retailer and the customer must accept it; both will have the right to use exact change".

Rounding applies only to cash payments and does not apply to bills paid electronically - by debit card, credit card or by store card.

== See also ==
- Adoption of the euro in Ireland
- Coins of the Republic of Ireland
