= Coin wrapper =

Paper or plastic container for a number of coins

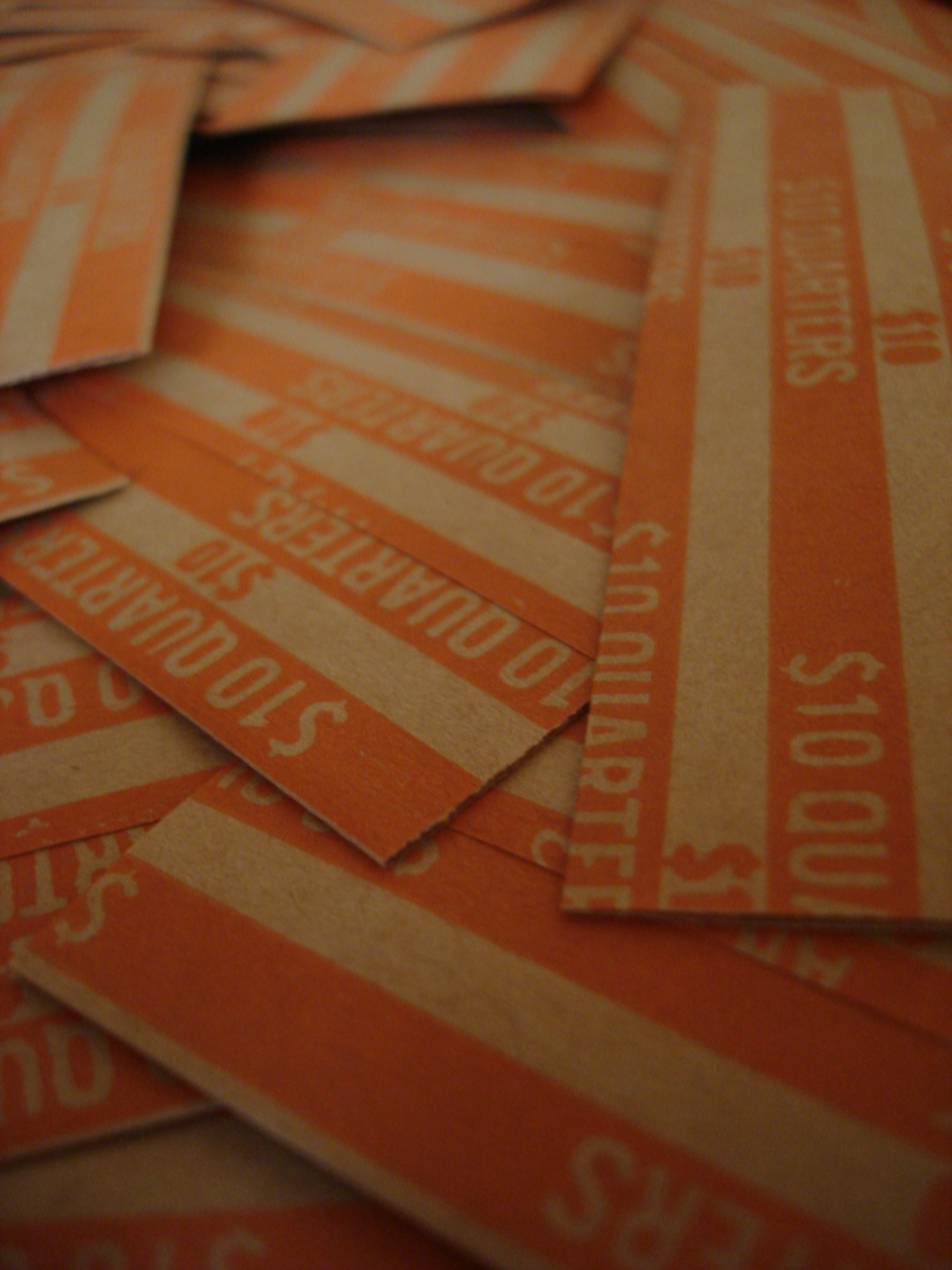
Stack of coin wrappers for US Quarters

A coin wrapper, also known as a bank roll or simply a roll, is a paper or plastic container designed to hold a specific number of coins. During 19th century, newly minted coins were collected in cloth bags. Initially, coin wrapping was a manual process. Since the onset of the 20th century, coin wrapping machines have been in use. The earliest patent for a coin wrapping machine was in 1901. By 1910, automatic coin counting machines were in use, which could reject counterfeit coins, wrap coins, and crimp the coin wrapper ends.

== History ==
In the 19th century coins were collected in cloth bags after they were struck at the mint. Initially coin wrapping was done by hand. In 1913 the Federal Reserve bank was created. After the creation of the Federal Reserve, bags of coins were sent to the individual reserve banks. Each branch then put the coins into paper wrappers with tightly sealed ends. These rolls were called "Original Bank-Wrapped Rolls" (OBW). When other banks wrapped the coins they would print their bank name on the wrapper.

=== Coin wrapping machines ===
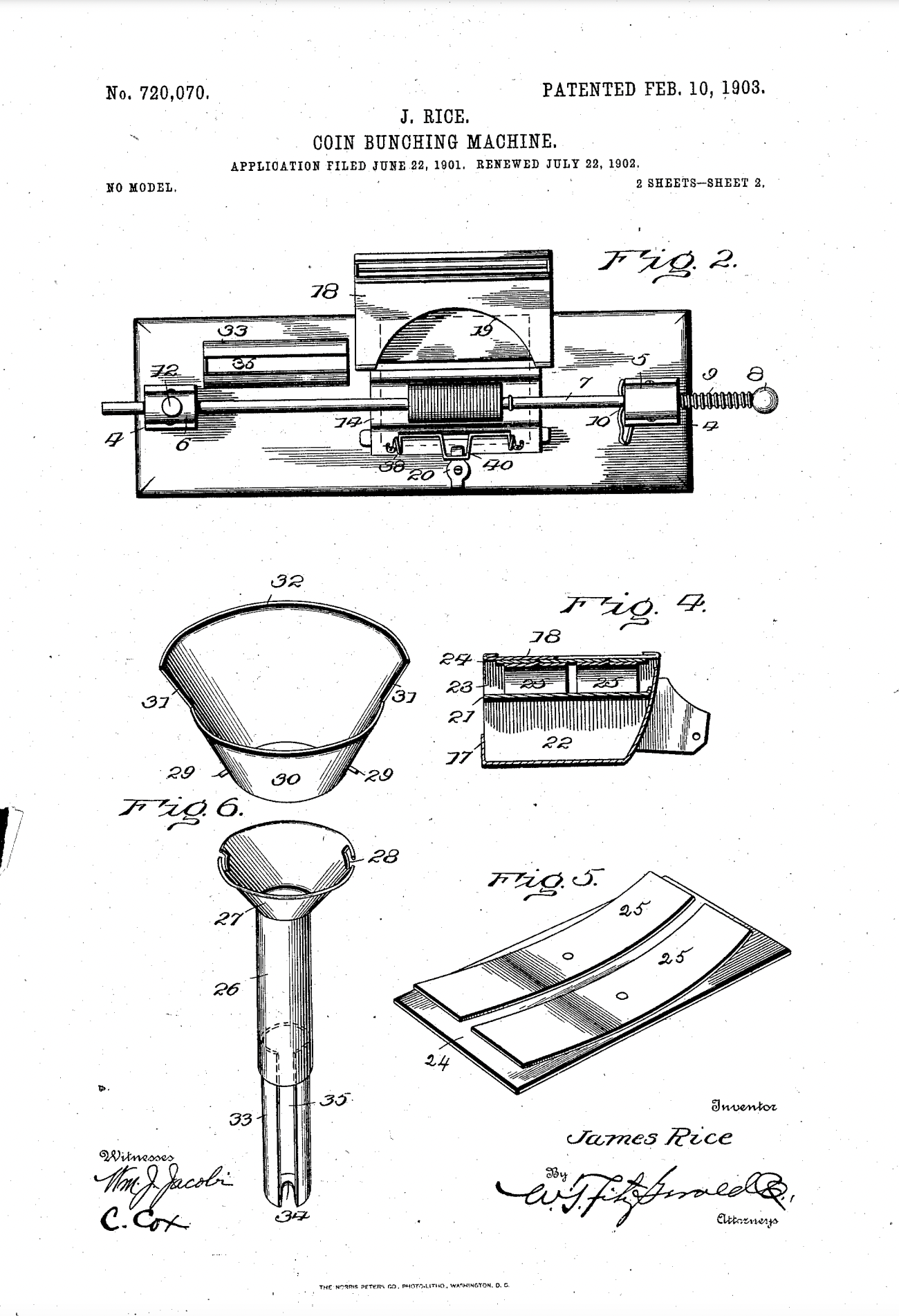
1903 Coin Bunching Machine Drawing

On 22 June 1901, James Rice applied for a patent (number 720070) for what he called a "Coin Bunching Machine". The patent was issued on 10 February 1903. Rice described his invention by stating that it was an "efficient manner means for bunching together any preferred number of coins of a selected denomination and holding them in position whereby they may be very conveniently and expeditiously wrapped or covered with a paper jacket."

On 9 November 1907 Erskine W Jennings applied for a patent on a machine he called "Coin Wrapper" which could crimp the ends of the coin rolls. On 3 August 1909 he was granted patent number 930,291. The machine was still not fully automatic.

=== Automatic coin wrapping machines ===
By October 1908 the first fully automatic coin wrapping machine was created and a patented was applied for. The Automatic Coin-Wrapping Machine Company applied for a patent on the machine and it was granted October 1910: patent number #973335. The applicant of record was Charles S. Batdorf; a man who applied for many coin related machine patents as early as his 1890 (Coin Operated Apparatus). In 1908 he was granted patent number 358,670 for a "Spurious Coin Detector". A machine which he said could, "Provide a means whereby bogus, spurious or counterfeit coins will be rejected by the machine automatically even though they be of the same size as the genuine coins of the value for which the machine is designed to operate."

By 1911 banks in the United States were using coin rolling machines. Some banks began to use standardized paper colors based on denomination. The machines were capable of culling counterfeit and damaged coins.

== Modern coin wrapping ==
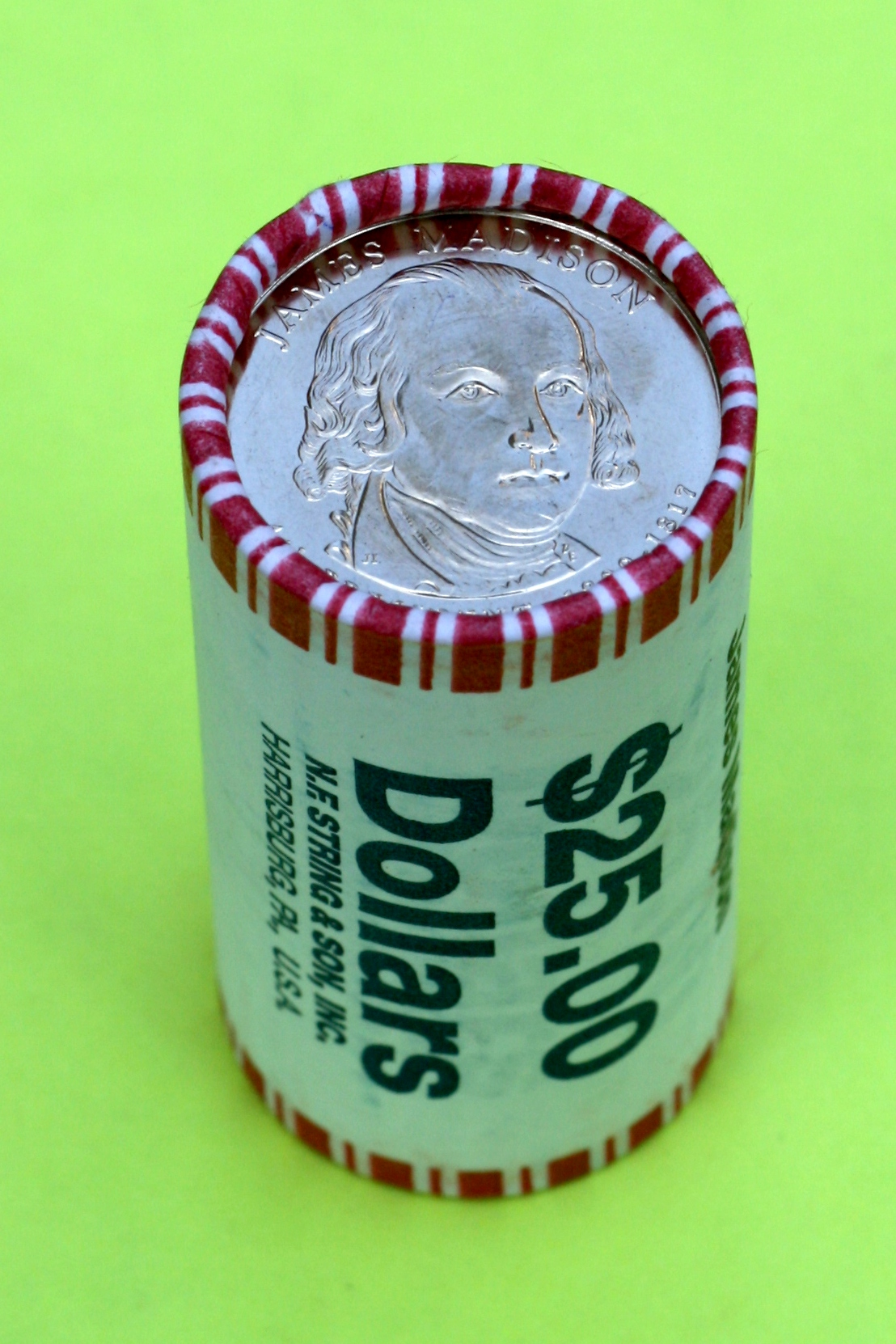
A roll of 25 U.S. dollar coins

In the United States, most banks offer empty rolls in every denomination (though it is becoming increasingly difficult for half dollar and dollar to be readily made available). The rolls come flat and one side will have to be folded to allow for coins to be placed inside. When the roll is full, the top side will need to be folded. Typically, the full rolls are brought back to the banks in exchange for currency or to be deposited. The Royal Canadian Mint uses check weighers to verify the number of coins per roll.

In the Eurozone, empty plastic rolls are used at banks in every denomination, with five-coin staggered rows. The five-coin rows and transparency make quick verification of contents possible, with a high degree of certainty. This results in less time spent processing coins, while the solidity and two-way closure system increase the number of times the coin roll can be used, effectively reducing its overall cost.

In Japan, machine-wrapped, plastic coin rolls are circulated almost exclusively, as handmade coin rolls are rare. Each roll holds 50 coins. Customers can change bills into coin rolls easily using automatic money changers at Japanese banks.

In the United Kingdom, coin rolls are not used. Instead, small plastic bags are provided free of charge at banks which are filled by the customer with the appropriate number of the same value coin as printed on the bag, with these bags also provided by banks when withdrawing amounts of money in coins. When depositing or changing, the bags are weighed at the bank to check they contain the right number.

== Searching coin rolls ==
Often, coin collectors will ask for full rolls from the bank to search the contents in hopes of finding an interesting or valuable coin. Some collectors also save coins of bullion value, such as copper pennies and silver half-dollars. This practice is called coin roll hunting. It is also known as cherry picking. Full rolls are also requested by vendors to make change. Some coin roll hunters look for mint-made errors such as double die coins. The error coins often have a high numismatic value to coin collectors.

== Fraud ==
Bank rolls are vulnerable to a variety of scams, such as rolling slugs of no value or coins of a lesser value. In 2018 a scammer in Canada hid washers in coin rolls which were supposed to contain two dollar coins.

== Amount in a roll in various countries ==
=== Afghanistan ===
Currency: Afghan afghani

Color	Denomination	Count	Total Value	Weight (g)
Red	Af.1	50	Afs.50	162.5
Blue	Afs.2	40	Afs.80	164
Purple	Afs.5	40	Afs.200	203.2

=== Albania ===
Currency: Albanian lek

Color	Denomination	Count	Total Value	Weight (g)
Gray	1 Lek	50	50 Lek	150
Red	5 Lek	50	250 Lek	156
Purple	10 Lek	50	500 Lek	180
Orange	20 Lek	25	500 Lek	≥115

=== Algeria ===
Currency: Algerian dinar

Color	Denomination	Count	Total Value	Weight (g)	Notes
White	200 dinars	20	4,000 dinars	240	Bi-metallic

=== Argentina ===
Currency: Argentine peso

Color	Denomination	Count	Total Value	Weight (g)	Notes
Black	5 centavos	50	$2.5	100	
Orange	$2	25	$50	360	Old Bi-metallic coin

=== Australia ===
Currency: Australian dollar
Australian coins used to have different ink colors, but now they all have black ink.

Denomination	Count	Total Value	Weight (g)	Notes
1c	50	$0.50	130	obsolete, (in the past, found in red rolls)
2c	50	$1	260	obsolete, (in the past, found in red rolls)
5c	40	$2	113	(in the past, found in blue rolls)
10c	40	$4	226	(in the past, found in purple rolls)
20c	20	$4	226	(in the past, found in green rolls )
50c	20	$10	311	(in the past, found in orange rolls can be paper)
$1	20	$20	200	
$2	25	$50	165	

Coins can alternatively be stored in small, reusable plastic bags like in the UK and Ireland.

Denomination	Count	Total Value	Weight (g)
5c	100	$5	283
10c	100	$10	565
20c	50	$10	565
50c	20	$10	311
$1	20	$20	200
$2	25	$50	165

=== Austria ===
Currency: Austrian schilling

Denomination	Count	Total Value	Weight (g)	Notes
2 groschen	50	S 1		obsolete

=== Bahamas ===
Currency: Bahamian dollar
The Bahamas has two different kinds of rolls with the same number of coins. One kind is distinguished by color, while the other is adorned with a light blue background with the Flag of the Bahamas. The rolls here are the ones distinguished by color.

Color	Denomination	Count	Total Value	Weight (g)	Notes
Blue	1 Cent	50	$0.50	87.5	
Purple	5 Cents	40	$2	140	
Orange	10 Cents	40	$4	208	Sometimes blue
Green	25 cents	40	$10	200	

=== Bahrain ===
Currency: Bahraini dinar

Color	Denomination	Count	Total Value	Weight (g)
Green	5 fils	50	250 fils	125
Yellow	10 fils	50	500 fils	167.5
Purple	25 fils	50	BD 1.25	175
Pink	50 fils	50	BD 2.50	225
Blue	100 fils	50	BD 5	300

=== Bangladesh ===
Currency: Bangladeshi taka

Color	Denomination	Count	Total Value	Weight (g)	Notes
White	2 Taka	50	৳100	275	small coin variety
White	5 Taka	50	৳250	275	small coin variety

=== Belgium ===
Currency: Belgian franc

Color	Denomination	Count	Total Value	Weight (g)	Notes
Black	25 centimes	50	12.5 francs		obsolete
Purple	50 centimes	50	25 francs		obsolete

=== Bosnia and Herzegovina ===
Currency: Convertible mark

Color	Denomination	Count	Total Value	Weight (g)
Black	5 feninga	50	2.5 convertible mark	

=== Bulgaria ===
Currency: Bulgarian lev

Color	Denomination	Count	Total Value	Weight (g)	Notes
White	1 stotinka	50	50 stotinki	90	
Yellow	2 stotinki	50	1 lev	125	Sometimes white
Blue	5 stotinki	50	2.50 leva	175	
Pink	10 stotinki	50	5 leva	150	
White	2 leva	25	50 leva	225	Bi-metallic

=== Canada ===
Currency: Canadian dollar
Canadian coin rolls are very similar to American coin rolls, with the exception being that rolls for the half dollar do not exist while rolls for the toonie do.

Color	Name	Denomination	Count	Total Value	Weight (g)
Blue	Nickel	5¢	40	$2.00	≥158
Green	Dime	10¢	50	$5.00	≥87.5
Orange	Quarter	25¢	40	$10.00	≥176
Black	Loonie	$1.00	25	$25.00	≥156.75
Purple	Toonie	$2.00	25	$50.00	≥173

=== Central African States ===
Currency: Central African CFA franc

Color	Denomination	Count	Total Value	Weight (g)	Notes
Purple	1 Franc	50	50 F.CFA	82.5	current coin version
Green	2 Francs	50	100 F.CFA	122.5	
Blue	5 Francs	50	250 F.CFA	120.5	current coin version
White	10 Francs	50	500 F.CFA	150-	current coin version

=== China, People's Republic ===
Currency: Renminbi

Color	Denomination	Count	Total Value	Weight (g)	Notes
Brown	¥0.01 RMB	50	¥0.50 RMB	35	
Brown	¥0.05 RMB	50	¥2.50 RMB	80	
Blue	¥0.10 RMB	50	¥5 RMB	≥56	sometimes brown
Yellow	¥0.50 RMB	50	¥25 RMB	190	
Red	¥1 RMB	50	¥50 RMB	305	sometimes brown

=== Comoros ===
Currency: Comorian franc

Color	Denomination	Count	Total Value	Weight (g)	Notes
Green	250 FC	40	10,000 FC	340	Bi-metallic coin

=== Costa Rica ===
Currency: Costa Rican colón

Color	Denomination	Count	Total Value	Weight (g)	Notes
Red	1 colón	25	25 colones	69.5	1998 variety (obsolete)

=== Cyprus ===
Currency: Cypriot pound

Color	Denomination	Count	Total Value	Weight (g)	Notes
Red	1 cent	25	£0.25	50	obsolete, sometimes black
Red	2 cents	25	£0.50	62.5	obsolete
Black	5 cents	25	£1.25	93.75	obsolete
Red	10 cents	25	£2.50	137.5	obsolete
Black	20 cents	25	£5.00	193.75	obsolete
Black	50 cents	25	£12.50	175	obsolete

=== Denmark ===
Currency: Danish krone

Color	Denomination	Count	Total Value	Weight (g)	Notes
Black	1 øre	50	50 øre	≥80	obsolete
Black	2 øre	50	1 kr.	≥60	obsolete
Black	5 øre	50	2.50 kr.	80	small coin variety (obsolete)
Yellow	10 øre	50	5 kr.	≥120	large coin variety, German occupied coins are holed (obsolete)
Brown	25 øre	40	10 kr.		obsolete
Red	50 øre	40	20 kr.	172	
Purple	1 kr.	50	50 kr.	180	Holed coin
Green	2 kr.	25	50 kr.	147.5	Holed coin
Black	5 kr.	40	200 kr.	368	Holed coin
Blue	10 kr.	20	200 kr.	140	
Yellow	20 kr.	20	400 kr.	186	

=== Ecuador ===
Currency: Ecuadorian sucre

Color	Denomination	Count	Total Value	Weight (g)	Notes
Black	S/.100	20	S/.2,000	71	Bi-metallic coin; obsolete
Red	S/.500	20	S/.10,000		Bi-metallic coin; obsolete
Green	S/.1,000	20	S/.20,000	134	Bi-metallic coin; obsolete

=== Egypt ===
Currency: Egyptian pound

Color	Denomination	Count	Total Value	Weight (g)
Green	25 PT.	40	£E 10	180
Purple	50 PT.	40	£E 20	260
Black	£E 1	25	£E 25	212.5

=== Estonia ===
Currency: Estonian kroon

Color	Denomination	Count	Total Value	Weight (g)	Notes
Black	10 senti	50	5 krooni		obsolete
Black	20 senti	50	10 krooni		obsolete

=== Eurozone ===
Currency: Euro

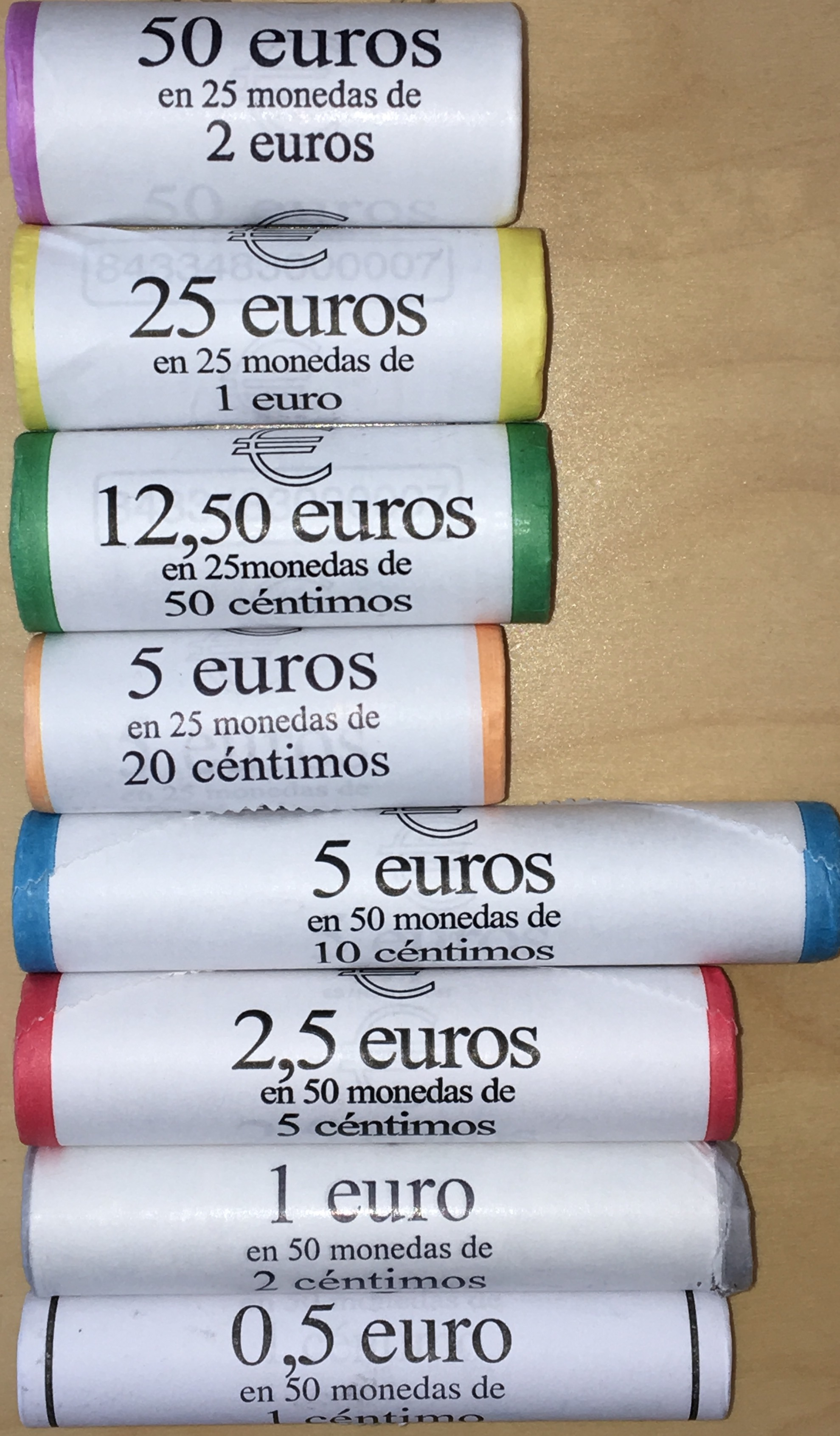
Coin rolls in Spain in all eight denominations of the euro.

Color	Denomination	Count	Total Value	Weight (g)
White	1 cents	50	€0.50	120
Gray	2 cents	50	€1.00	155
Red	5 cents	50	€2.50	195
Blue	10 cents	40	€4.00	164
Orange	20 cents	40	€8.00	233.2
Green	50 cents	40	€20.00	313.2
Yellow	€1	25	€25.00	189.3
Purple	€2	25	€50.00	207.5

==== Ireland ====
Unlike the rest of the eurozone, Ireland uses clear, reusable plastic bags for all denominations like the previous currency, the Irish pound.

Denomination	Count	Total Value	Weight (g)
1 cents	100	€1.00	230
2 cents	100	€2.00	306
5 cents	100	€5.00	392
10 cents	100	€10.00	410
20 cents	50	€10.00	287
50 cents	50	€25.00	390
€1	25	€25.00	187.5
€2	25	€50.00	212.5

==== Spain ====
Three of the rolls used in Spain are different from the ones used in the rest of the eurozone.

Color	Denomination	Count	Total Value	Weight (g)
Blue	10 cents	50	€5.00	205
Orange	20 cents	25	€5.00	143.5
Green	50 cents	25	€12.50	195

==== Italy ====
Until 2009, two of the rolls used in Italy were different from the ones used in the rest of the eurozone.

Color	Denomination	Count	Total Value	Weight (g)
Yellow	€1	40	€40.00	300
Purple	€2	40	€80.00	340

=== Federal Republic of Germany ===
Currency: German (Deutsche) Mark

Color	Denomination	Count	Total Value	Weight (g)	Notes
Black	1 pfennig	50	50 pfennings	100	obsolete
Red	2 pfennigs	50	DM 1	≥145	obsolete
Pink	5 pfennigs	50	DM 2.5	150	obsolete, sometimes blue
Purple	10 pfennigs	50	DM 5	200	obsolete

=== Fiji ===
Currency: Fijian dollar

Color	Denomination	Count	Total Value	Weight (g)
Green	5 cents	40	$2	≥96
Black	50 cents	20	$10	130

=== Finland ===
Currency: Finnish mark

Color	Denomination	Count	Total Value	Weight (g)	Notes
Black	1 penni	50	50 pennies	≥22.5	obsolete
Pink	5 pennia	50	Mk.2.50	≥40	obsolete
Green	10 pennia	50	Mk.5	≥50	obsolete
Orange	20 pennia	50	Mk.10	≥40	large coin variety, obsolete

=== France ===
Currency: French franc

Color	Denomination	Count	Total Value	Weight (g)	Notes
Red	1 centime	50	50 centimes	82.5	obsolete
Orange	5 centimes	50	2.50 F	100	obsolete
Teal	1 F	25	25 F	150	obsolete

==== French Pacific Territories ====
Currency: CFP franc
Prior to 2021, French Polynesia and New Caledonia produced different coins under the same currency. Since December 1, 2022, these former coins and rolls they appeared in have been replaced by a new, single series of rolls and coinage.

Color	Denomination	Count	Total Value	Weight (g)	Notes
Brown	20 F	25	500 F	250	obsolete
Brown	20 F	50	1000 F	355	
Purple	50 F	50	2500 F	330	
Yellow	200 F	25	5000 F	212.5	bi-metallic

=== Ghana ===
Currency: Ghanaian cedi

Color	Denomination	Count	Total Value	Weight (g)	Notes
Pink	50 cedis	40	2,000 cedis	300	Second cedi; obsolete

=== Greece ===
Currency: Greek drachma

Color	Denomination	Count	Total Value	Weight (g)	Notes
Yellow	₯1	50	₯50		obsolete
Gray	₯2	50	₯100		obsolete
Green	₯5	50	₯250		obsolete
Pink	₯10	50	₯500		obsolete
Blue	₯20	25	₯500		obsolete
White	₯50	40	₯2,000		obsolete
Orange	₯100	40	₯4,000		obsolete

=== Honduras ===
Currency: Honduran lempira

Color	Denomination	Count	Total Value	Weight (g)
Blue	5 Centavos	40	L 2	128
Green	10 Centavos	50	L 5	300
Black	20 Centavos	50	L 10	100
Red	50 Centavos	25	L 12.50	125

=== Hungary ===
Currency: Hungarian forint

Color	Denomination	Count	Total Value	Weight (g)	Notes
Black	20 fillér	50	10 Ft.		obsolete, sometimes green
Black	5 Ft.	50	250 Ft.		
Red	10 Ft.	50	500 Ft.		
Black	20 Ft.	50	1,000 Ft.		
Red	50 Ft.	50	2,500 Ft.		

=== Iceland ===
Currency: Icelandic króna

Color	Denomination	Count	Total Value	Weight (g)	Notes
Brown	5 krónur	50	250 krónur		

=== Indonesia ===
Currency: Indonesian rupiah

Color	Denomination	Count	Total Value	Weight (g)	Notes
Brown	Rp.5	20	Rp.100	27.6	obsolete, sometimes white
Green	Rp.25	20	Rp.500	70.4	large coin variety, obsolete
Grey	Rp.25	25	Rp.625	30.5	small coin variety, obsolete
Purple	Rp.50	20	Rp.1,000	121.2	large coin variety, obsolete
Yellow	Rp.50	25	Rp.1,250	34	
Pink	Rp.100	25	Rp.2,500	44.75	
Purple	Rp.200	25	Rp.5,000	59.5	
Green	Rp.500	25	Rp.12,500	77.5	
Blue	Rp.1,000	40	Rp.40,000	180	

=== Israel ===
Currency: Israeli new shekel

Color	Denomination	Count	Total Value	Weight (g)
Yellow	10 agorot	50	₪5.00	200
Green	₪½ (50 agorot)	50	₪25.00	325
Blue	₪1	50	₪50.00	175
Purple	₪2	25	₪50.00	142.5
Pink	₪5	25	₪125.00	205
Red	₪10	25	₪250.00	175

=== Italy ===
Currency: Italian lira

Color	Denomination	Count	Total Value	Weight (g)	Notes
Green	5 Lire	50	250 Lire	50	obsolete
Red	20 Lire	50	1,000 Lire	180	obsolete, sometimes brown or purple
Green	50 Lire	50	2,500 Lire		obsolete
Yellow	200 Lire	50	10,000 Lire	250	obsolete

=== Japan ===
Currency: Japanese yen

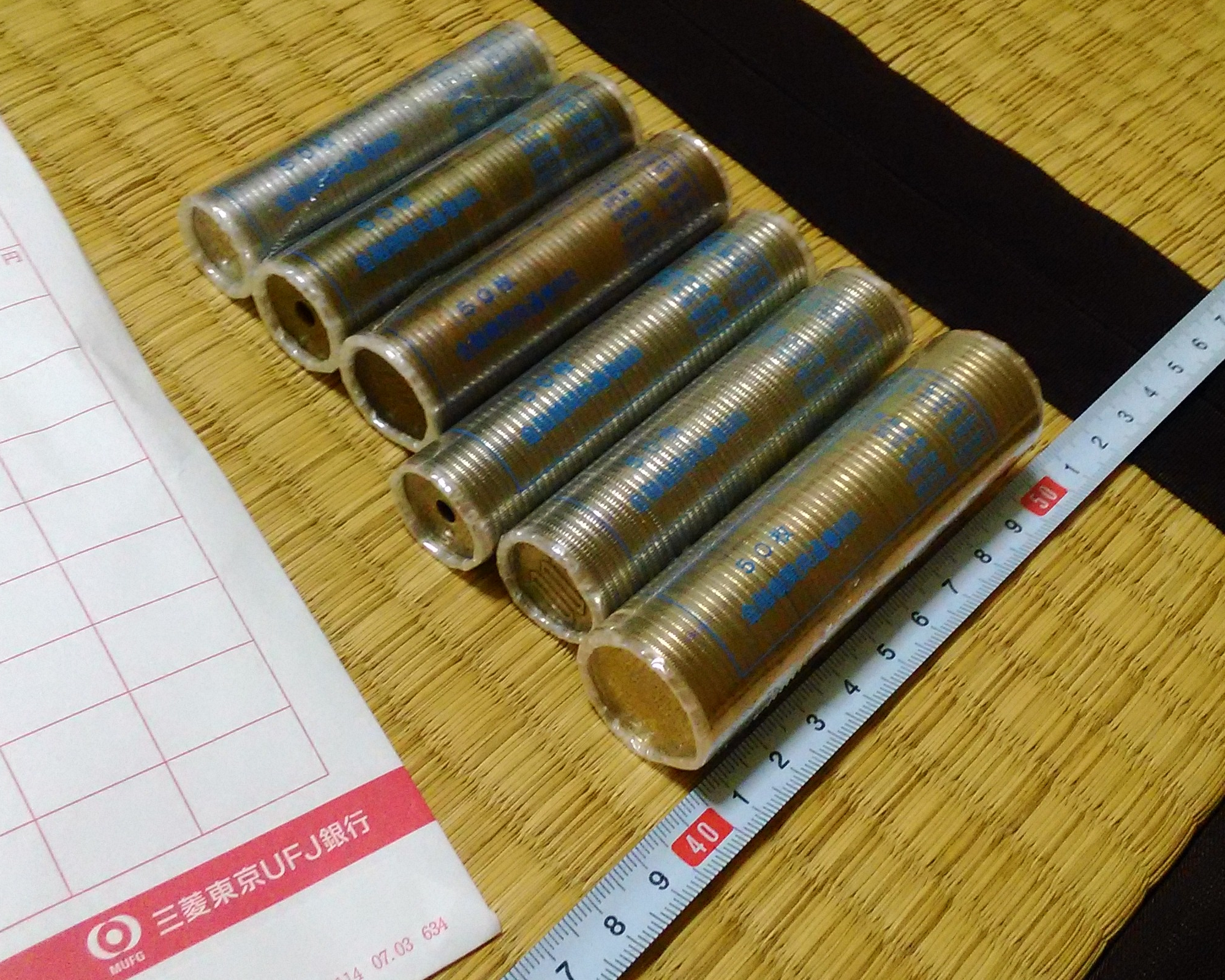
Coin rolls in Japan

Japanese coin rolls are made of plastic and are not color-differentiated. Each roll holds 50 coins. Older coin rolls were made out of paper.

Denomination	Count	Total Value	Weight (g)	Method of differentiation
¥1	50	¥50	50	silver color (aluminum) with smooth edge
¥5	50	¥250	187.5	brass color with smooth edge, holed coin
¥10	50	¥500	225	bronze color with smooth edge; coins minted between 1951 and 1958 have reeded edge
¥50	50	¥2,500	200	silver color (cupronickel) with reeded edge, holed coin
¥100	50	¥5,000	240	silver color (cupronickel) with reeded edge
¥500	50	¥25,000	350	brass color (nickel-brass) with helically reeded edge

=== Kuwait ===
Currency: Kuwaiti dinar

Color	Denomination	Count	Total Value	Weight (g)
Orange	5 fils	50	0.25 dinars	127.5

=== Latvia ===
Currency: Latvian lats

Color	Denomination	Count	Total Value	Weight (g)	Notes
Black	1 santims	50	0.5 lats	80	sometimes purple, obsolete
Red	2 santimi	50	1 lats	95	obsolete
Blue	5 santimi	50	2.50 lati	125	obsolete
Red	10 santimu	50	5 lati	162.5	obsolete
Red	1 lats	50	50 latu	240	obsolete

=== Lebanon ===
Currency: Lebanese pound

Color	Denomination	Count	Total Value	Weight (g)
Blue	£L25	50	£1,250	
Green	£L50	50	£L2,500	
Red	£L100	50	£L5,000	
Yellow	£L250	50	£L12,500	
Gray	£L500	50	£L25,000	

=== Lithuania ===
Currency: Lithuanian litas

Color	Denomination	Count	Total Value	Weight (g)	Notes
Black	1 Lt.	40	40 Lt.		obsolete

=== Malawi ===
Currency: Malawian kwacha

Color	Denomination	Count	Total Value	Weight (g)
Black	2 tambala	50	K1	≥168

=== Mexico ===
Currency: Mexican peso

Color	Denomination	Count	Total Value	Weight (g)	Notes
Red	1 centavo	50	50 centavos		obsolete
Black	5 centavos	40	Mex$2		obsolete
Green	Mex$200	25	Mex$5,000		Non-circulating commemorative coin; obsolete

=== Moldova ===
Currency: Moldovan leu

Color	Denomination	Count	Total Value	Weight (g)	Notes
White	1 Leu	50	50 Lei	222.5	current 1 Leu coin version
Yellow	2 Lei	25	50 Lei	167.5	
Pink	5 Lei	25	125 Lei	177.5	Bi-metallic, current 5 Lei coin version
Blue	10 Lei	25	250 Lei	191.25	Bi-metallic

=== Morocco ===
Currency: Moroccan dirham

Color	Denomination	Count	Total Value	Weight (g)	Notes
Red	Dhs.5	40	Dhs.200		Bi-metallic coin

=== Nepal ===
Currency: Nepalese rupee

Color	Denomination	Count	Total Value	Weight (g)
Brown	1 rupee	50	रु50	200
White	2 rupees	40	रु80	200

=== Netherlands ===
Currency: Dutch guilder

Color	Denomination	Count	Total Value	Weight (g)	Notes
Turquoise	10 cents	50	5 guilders		obsolete

=== New Zealand ===
Currency: New Zealand dollar

Color	Denomination	Count	Total Value	Weight (g)	Notes
Pink	10 cents	50	$5	165	
Black	20 cents	25	$5	100	
Yellow	50 cents	20	$10	100	
Blue	$1	25	$25	175	
Orange	$2	25	$50	250	

=== Norway ===
Currency: Norwegian krone

Color	Denomination	Count	Total Value	Weight (g)	Notes
Blue	1 øre	50	50 øre		obsolete
Red	2 øre	50	1 kr.		obsolete
Brown	5 øre	50	2.5 kr.		obsolete
Purple	10 øre	50	5 kr.		obsolete
Red	25 øre	50	10 kr.		obsolete
Green	50 øre	50	25 kr.		obsolete
Orange	1 kr.	50	50 kr.		
Turquoise	5 kr.	50	250 kr.		
Yellow	10 kr.	50	500 kr.		
Brown	20 kr.	25	500 kr.		

=== Oman ===
Currency: Omani rial

Color	Denomination	Count	Total Value	Weight (g)	Notes
Green	5 baisa	50	2.5 Omani rials		
Orange	10 baisa	50	5 Omani rials		
Yellow	25 baisa	50	12.5 Omani rials		
Blue	50 baisa	50	25 Omani rials		

=== Panama ===
Currency: Panamanian balboa

Color	Denomination	Count	Total Value	Weight (g)	Notes
Red	1 centesimo	50	50 centesimos		
Blue	5 centesimos	40	B/. 2		
Red	B/.1/4	40	B/.10		

=== Papua New Guinea ===
Currency: Papua New Guinean kina

Color	Denomination	Count	Total Value	Weight (g)	Notes
Red	1 toea	50	K0.50	100	obsolete
Red	10 toea	50	K5	≥258	
Purple	1 kina	25	K25	362.5	sometimes blue
Yellow	2 kina	25	K50	305	Bi-metallic

=== Peru ===
Currency: Peruvian sol

Color	Denomination	Count	Total Value	Weight (g)	Notes
Black	S/.1	20	S/.20		

=== Philippines ===
Currency: Philippine peso

Color	Denomination	Count	Total Value	Weight (g)	Notes
Brown	5 sentimo	40	₱2		1967 Pilipino series; obsolete
Blue	10 sentimo	50	₱5		1967 Pilipino series; obsolete

=== Poland ===
Currency: Polish złoty

Color	Denomination	Count	Total Value	Weight (g)	Notes
Green	10 groszy	50	5 złotych		Third złoty; obsolete
Green	20 groszy	50	20 złotych		Third złoty; obsolete
Black	5 złotych	50	250 złotych		Third złoty; obsolete

=== Portugal ===
Currency: Portuguese escudo

Color	Denomination	Count	Total Value	Weight (g)	Notes
Black	10 centavos	50	5$00		obsolete
Red	50 centavos	50	25$00		obsolete
Yellow	1$00	25	25$00		obsolete
Brown	5$00	40	200$00		obsolete
Brown	25$00	20	500$00		obsolete

=== Romania ===
Currency: Romanian leu

Color	Denomination	Count	Total Value	Weight (g)	Notes
Blue	1,000 lei	40	40,000 Lei	80	Third leu; obsolete
Red	1 ban	50	50 bani	120	
Yellow	5 bani	50	2.50 Lei	140.5	
Pink	10 bani	50	5 Lei	200	
White	50 bani	50	25 Lei	305	

=== San Marino ===
Currency: Sammarinese lira

Color	Denomination	Count	Total Value	Weight (g)	Notes
Gray	10 Lire	50	500 Lire		obsolete

=== Saudi Arabia ===
Currency: Saudi riyal

The following rolls are based on the 2016 variety coins.

Color	Denomination	Count	Total Value	Weight (g)	Notes
Yellow	1 halala	50	50 halalas	100	
White	5 halalas	40	2 riyals	96	
Purple	10 halalas	50	5 riyals	140	
Gray	25 halalas	40	10 riyals	164	
Blue	2 Riyals	50	100 riyals	335	Bi-metallic

=== Serbia ===
Currency: Serbian dinar

Color	Denomination	Count	Total Value	Weight (g)
Green	1 din.	50	50 din.	210
Orange	2 din.	50	100 din.	252.5
Blue	5 din.	50	250 din.	289

=== Seychelles ===
Currency: Seychellois rupee

Color	Denomination	Count	Total Value	Weight (g)	Notes
Yellow	Rs.10/-	25	Rs.250/-		Bi-metallic coin

=== Singapore ===
Currency: Singaporean dollar

Color	Denomination	Count	Total Value	Weight (g)
Yellow	5 Cents	40	S$2	68
Green	10 Cents	50	S$5	118
Blue	20 Cents	50	S$10	192.5
Red	50 Cents	40	S$20	262.4
Beige	S$1	40	S$40	304.8

=== South Korea ===
Currency: South Korean won

Color	Denomination	Count	Total Value	Weight (g)
Yellow	₩10	50	₩500	61
Pink	₩50	50	₩2,500	208
Blue	₩100	50	₩5,000	271
Beige	₩500	50	₩25,000	385

=== Soviet Union ===
Currency: Soviet rouble

Color	Denomination	Count	Total Value	Weight (g)	Notes
Brown	1 Rbl.	20	20 Rbls.	150	obsolete

=== Spain ===
Currency: Spanish peseta

Color	Denomination	Count	Total Value	Weight (g)	Notes
Blue	1 Pta.	50	50 Ptas.	≥60	large coin variety, obsolete
Brown	5 Pta.	50	250 Ptas.	287.5	23 mm coin variety, obsolete
Blue	10 Pta.	40	400 Ptas.	160	obsolete

=== Sweden ===
Currency: Swedish krona

Color	Denomination	Count	Total Value	Weight (g)	Notes
Green	1 öre	100	1 kr.		obsolete
Brown	2 öre	50	1 kr.		obsolete
Green	5 öre	50	2.50 kr.		obsolete, sometimes brown
Yellow	10 öre	50	5 kr.		obsolete, sometimes purple
Red	25 öre	40	10 kr.		obsolete
Blue	50 öre	50	25 kr.		obsolete, sometimes green
Green	1 kr.	50	50 kr.	180	sometimes orange
Red	2 kr.	50	100 kr.	240	
Orange	5 kr.	40	200 kr.	244	sometimes blue
Purple	10 kr.	25	250 kr.	165	

=== Switzerland ===
Currency: Swiss franc

Color	Denomination	Count	Total Value	Weight (g)	Notes
Yellow	1 rappen	50	CHF ½	≤75	obsolete, sometimes orange
White	2 rappen	50	CHF 1	≤150	obsolete, sometimes brown
Red	5 rappen	50	CHF 2.50	90	sometimes purple
Gray	10 rappen	50	CHF 5	150	
Pink	20 rappen	50	CHF 10	200	
Purple	CHF ½ (50 rappen)	50	CHF 25	110	
Green	CHF 1	50	CHF 50	220	
Beige	CHF 2	50	CHF 100	440	
Blue	CHF 5	50	CHF 250	663	(in the past, sometimes found in 25 coin, Fr. 125, half-rolls)

=== Taiwan ===
Currency: New Taiwan dollar

Color	Denomination	Count	Total Value	Weight (g)
Yellow	NT$10	50	NT$500	375
Purple	NT$20	50	NT$1,000	425
White	NT$50	40	NT$2,000	

=== Thailand ===
Currency: Thai baht

Color	Denomination	Count	Total Value	Weight (g)	Notes
Pink	50 satang	50	฿25		
Blue	฿1	50	฿50		
Purple	฿2	50	฿100		
Green	฿5	40	฿200		
Orange	฿10	40	฿400		Bi-metallic coin

=== Trinidad and Tobago ===
Currency: Trinidad and Tobago dollar

Color	Denomination	Count	Total Value	Weight (g)	Notes
Blue	1 cent	50	50 cents		obsolete

=== Turkmenistan ===
Currency: Turkmen manat

Color	Denomination	Count	Total Value	Weight (g)	Notes
Red	2 tenge	50	1 manat		
Blue	5 tenge	50	2.5 manats		
Yellow	10 tenge	50	5 manats		
Blue	2 manats	40	80 manats		Bi-metallic coin

=== Uganda ===
Currency: Ugandan shilling

Color	Denomination	Count	Total Value	Weight (g)	Notes
Orange	5/=	40	200/=	140	
Red	50/=	20	1,000/=	78	
Black	100/=	20	2,000/=	≥132	
Blue	200/=	20	4,000/=	≥145	
Green	500/=	20	10,000/=	180	
Purple	1,000/=	20	20,000/=	205	sometimes white

=== Ukraine ===
Currency: Ukrainian hryvnia

Color	Denomination	Count	Total Value	Weight (g)	Notes
Pink	1 Kopiyka	50	0.5₴	75	obsolete
Yellow	2 Kopiyky	50	1₴	90	obsolete
Green	5 Kopiyok	50	2.5₴	215	obsolete
Brown	10 Kopiyok	50	5₴	85	
Black	25 Kopiyok	50	12.5₴	145	obsolete
Blue	50 Kopiyok	50	25₴	212.5	
Red	1₴	50	50₴	165	small coin variety
Pink	2₴	50	100₴	200	
Orange	5₴	40	200₴	208	
Green	10₴	40	400₴	256	

=== United Arab Emirates ===
Currency: United Arab Emirates dirham

Color	Denomination	Count	Total Value	Weight (g)	Notes
Orange	1 fils	50	0.50 dirhams	75	
Black	5 fils	40	2 dirhams	88	small coin version
Yellow	10 fils	50	5 dirhams	150	sometimes green
Green	25 fils	40	10 dirhams	140	sometimes red
Blue	50 fils	40	20 dirhams	≥166	
Red	1 dirham	40	40 dirhams	≥244	

=== United Kingdom ===
Currency: Sterling
The UK generally uses clear, reusable plastic bags in which a given quantity of coins is weighed. As the UK has traditionally relied on weight when counting coins, a conscious effort was made to ensure that the weight of 1p, 2p, 5p & 10p coins remained constant following the changes to their composition (from copper to copper-plated steel in 1992 for the 1p & 2p, and the 2008 change from copper-nickel to nickel-clad steel for the 5p & 10p coins). Relative densities of the respective metals meant that the thickness of the later coins was increased to maintain the coin's weight, thereby making coin rolls impractical; the differences in thicknesses are more notable in the 5p & 10p coins.

The proportional dimensions of pre-decimal coins continued past Decimal Day, meaning that the 2p and 10p coins weighed twice the 1p and 5p respectively; this correlation was continued when the 5p (1990) and 10p (1992) coins were reduced in size, leading to the situation that full bags of 1p and 2p coins, and 5p and 10p coins, have the same weight, and whilst banks discourage mixed coinage, it is possible to mix these denominations.

Denomination	Count	Total Value	Weight (g)	Notes
1/2p	100	£0.50		Obsolete
1p	100	£1		Previously in 50p coin bags; weight equal to bag of 2p coins
2p	50	£1		Previously in 50p coin bags; weight equal to bag of 1p coins
5p	100	£5		Weight equal to bag of 10p coins
10p	50	£5		Weight equal to bag of 5p coins
20p	50	£10		Formerly green-coloured bag
50p	20	£10		Formerly yellow-coloured bag
£1	20	£20		Formerly red-coloured bag
£2	10	£20		

=== United States ===
Currency: United States dollar

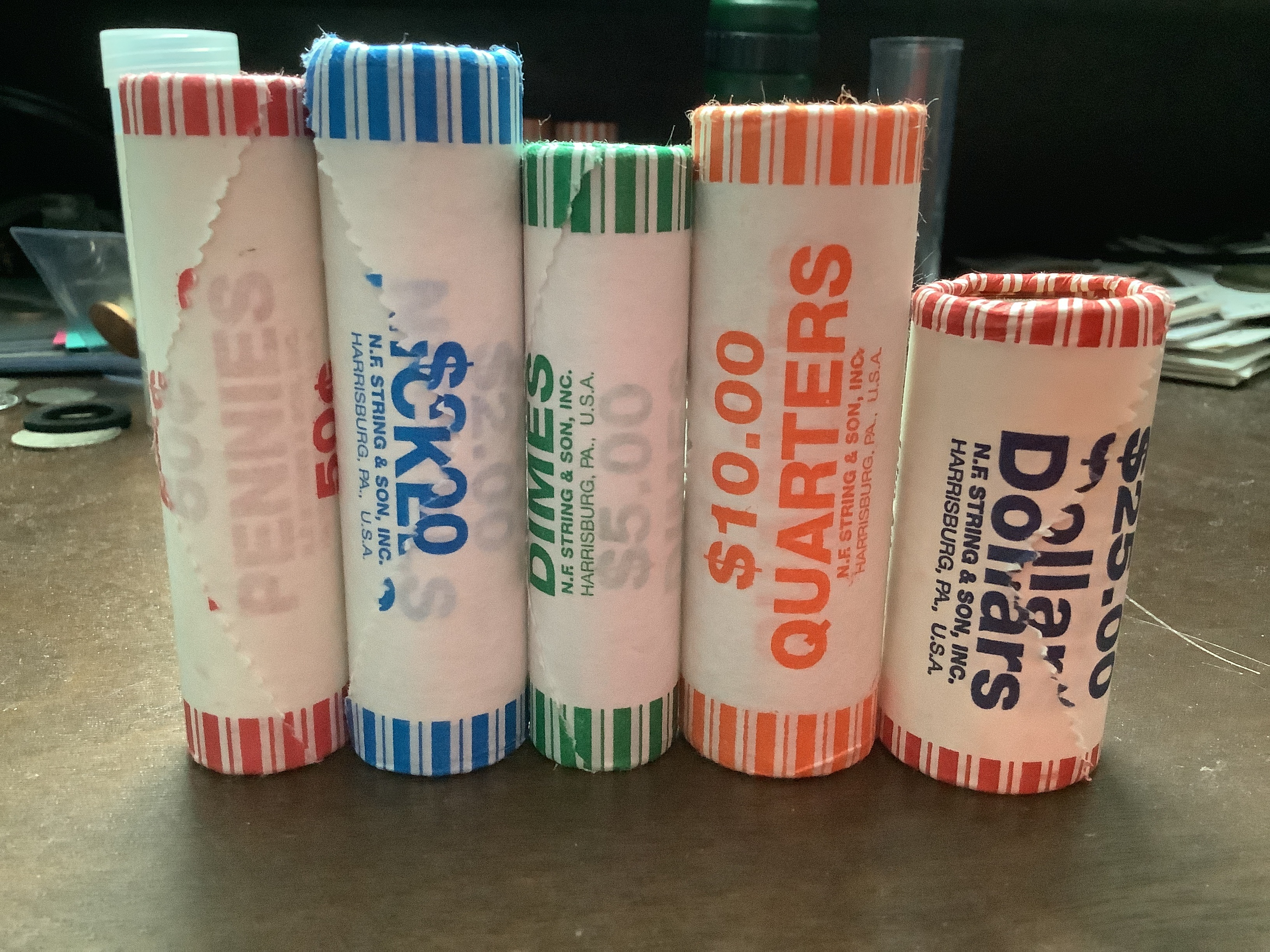
Assorted United States coin rolls

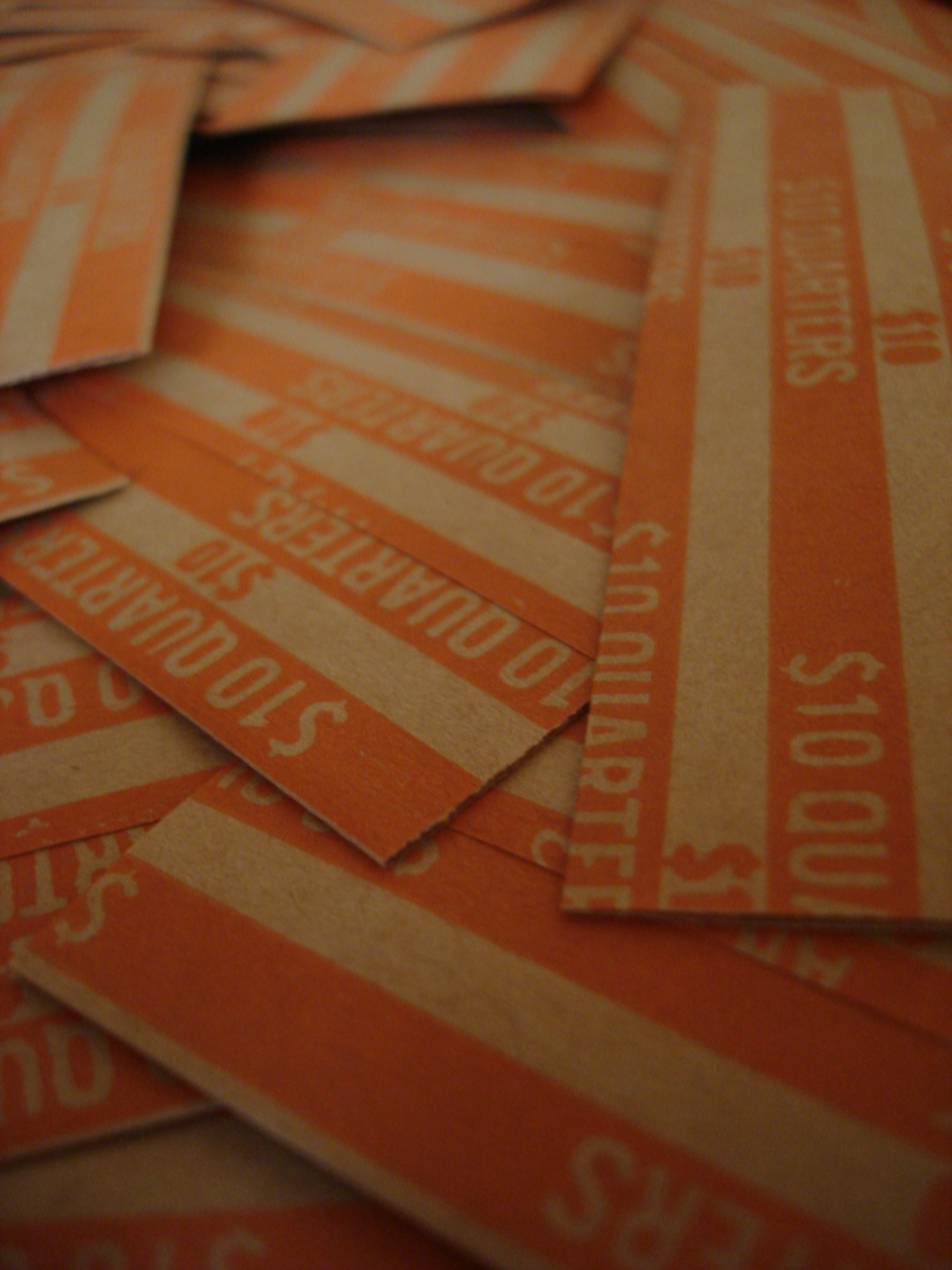
A pile of coin wrappers, one for quarters with a total face value of 10 U.S. dollars.

Each denomination has a different amount found in a roll and are color-coded by denomination. See below:

Color	Name	Denomination	Count	Total Value	Weight (g)	Notes
Red	Cent	1¢	50	$0.50	≥125	
Blue	Nickel	5¢	40	$2.00	200	(in the past, sometimes found in 20 coin, $1.00, half-rolls)
Green	Dime	10¢	50	$5.00	≥113.4	(in the past, sometimes found in 30 coin, $3.00 rolls)
Orange	Quarter	25¢	40	$10.00	≥226.8	(in the past, sometimes found in 20 coin, $5.00, half-rolls)
Yellow	Half Dollar	50¢	20	$10.00	≥226.8	(sometimes black, and sometimes found in 40 coin, $20.00, full-rolls that are closer in size to other denominations rolls)
Gray	Small Dollar	$1.00	25	$25.00	≥202.5	(in the past, sometimes found in 40 coin, $40.00 rolls)
Black	Large Dollar	$1.00	20	$20.00	453.6	Not obsolete just rarely seen as it has to be called in to order. (sometimes Gray or Tan, and sometimes found in 10 coin, $10.00, half-rolls)
N/A	Quarter Eagle	$2.50	40	$100.00	≈ 167.2	obsolete
N/A	Half Eagle	$5.00	40	$200.00	≈ 334.4	obsolete
N/A	Eagle	$10.00	50	$500.00	≈ 836	obsolete
N/A	Double Eagle	$20.00	25	$500.00	≈ 836	obsolete

In the United States, it is also common for coin dealers and online bullion shops to produce their own rolls of pre-1965 silver coinage for the purpose of selling them to customers; these rolls may be the same size and face value as those produced by banks, or may exist in half, full and double sizes.

=== Venezuela ===
Currency: Venezuelan bolívar

Color	Denomination	Count	Total Value	Weight (g)	Notes
Orange	25 céntimos	50	12.5 bolívares		Venezuelan bolívar; obsolete
Orange	25 céntimos	40	Bs.F 10		Hard bolívar; obsolete

=== Vietnam ===
Currency: Vietnamese đồng

Color	Denomination	Count	Total Value	Weight (g)
Gray	200₫	50	10,000₫	225
Red	5,000₫	40	200,000₫	308

=== West African States ===
Currency: Central African CFA franc

Color	Denomination	Count	Total Value	Weight (g)
Black	5 francs	50	250 francs	150

=== Yemen ===
Currency: Yemeni rial

Color	Denomination	Count	Total Value	Weight (g)	Notes
Black	1 rial	50	YRIs 50	132.5	
Blue	20 rials	50	YRIs 1,000	≥331	

== See also ==
- Coin roll hunting, the practice of searching coin rolls for unusual, rare or valuable coins
- Coin rolling scams
- Currency packaging
- Euro starter kits
