= CRH =

CRH may refer to:

- Calibre radius head, a traditional British ordnance term for a concept in ballistic projectile design
- Celtic Resources Holdings, an Irish mining company
- China Railway High-speed, a high-speed railway service operated by China Railway
- Choate Rosemary Hall, a private boarding school in Wallingford, Connecticut
- Coin roll hunting, the hobby of searching change pulled from circulation for collectible coins
- Combat Rescue Helicopter (HH-60W), being developed for the US Air Force based on the Sikorsky UH-60 Black Hawk
- Corticotropin-releasing hormone, a polypeptide hormone and neurotransmitter involved in the stress response
- Council on Religion and the Homosexual, an American LGBT rights organization
- CRH plc (Cement Roadstone Holdings), a building materials company, based in Ireland
- Crimean Tatar language's ISO 639-2 and 639-3 code
- Crouch Hill railway station, a railway station in England (National Rail station code: CRH)
- Critical relative humidity, a property of water-soluble substances
