= Coin rolling scams =

Type of scam involving coin wrappers

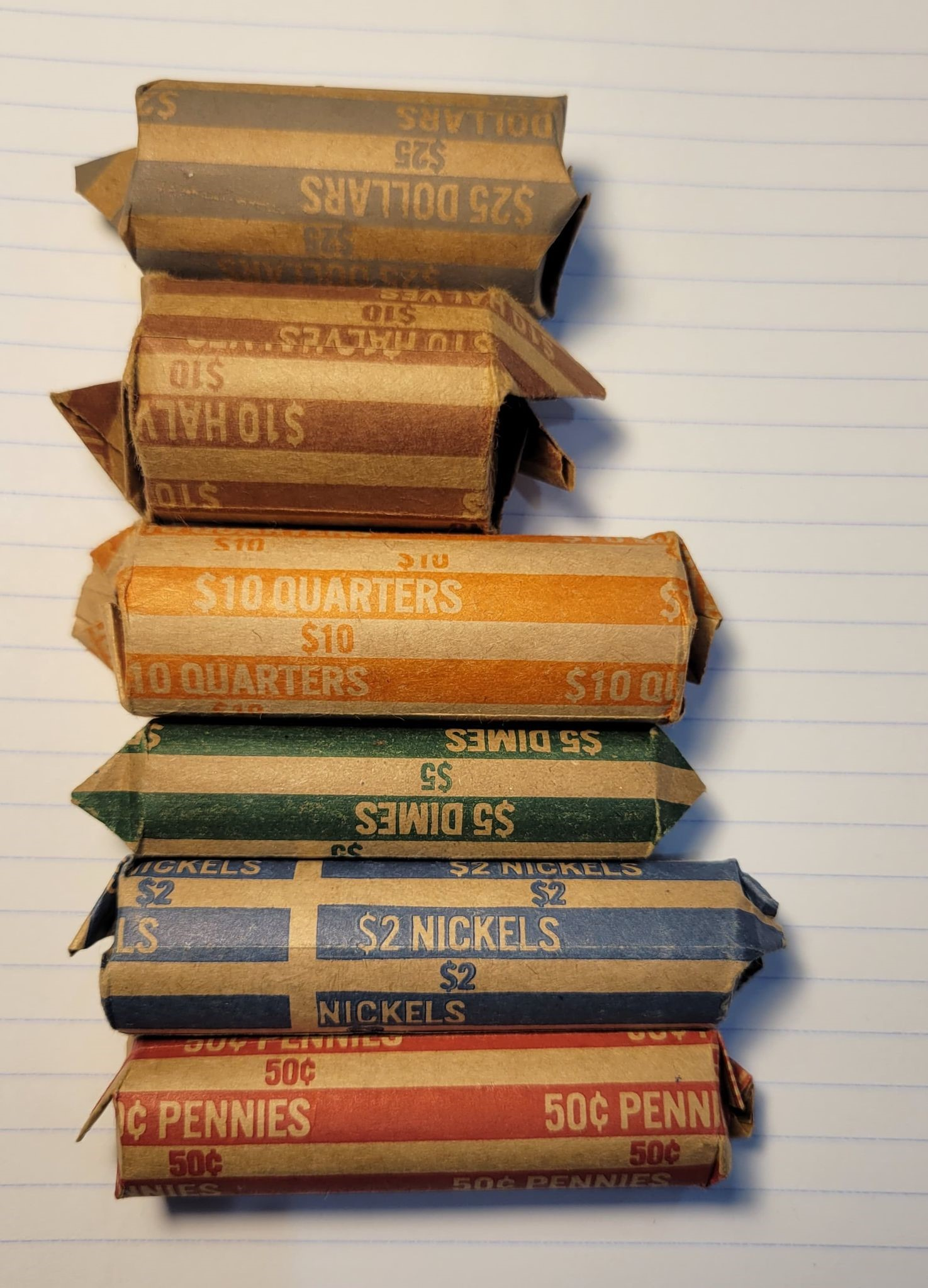
Paper coin rolls in various US currency denominations

Coin-rolling related scams are a collection of scams involving coin wrappers (rolls of coins). The scammer will roll coins of lesser value or slugs of no value, or less than the correct number of coins in a roll, then exchange them at a bank or retail outlet for cash.

To prevent these problems, many banks will require people turning in coins to have an account, and will debit the customer's account in the event of a shorted roll. Some banks also have machines to count coins.

== Penny and dime scam ==
The con will wrap pennies into a dime-roll wrapper and try to exchange it; this is known as "penny rolling" in slang. Sometimes the con will also exchange other legitimate rolls of coins at the same time. Another trick is to put dimes on the visible ends of the roll, and hidden pennies on the inside. This scam can also be done using nickels and quarters by placing 2 quarters on the ends and placing nickels in between.

== Short-rolling scams ==
Alternatively, one can place one or two fewer coins than usual in each roll. Half-dollars are a common choice for this kind of scam, for two reasons. First, there are only 20 coins per half-dollar roll, increasing the profit percentage. Also, since half-dollars rarely circulate, most bank tellers are unaware of the proper length and weight of a roll. Also owing to their lack of circulation, the missing coins are not likely to be discovered for a long time.

== "Unsearched" roll scams ==
As the practice of coin roll hunting has steadily grown more popular, unscrupulous sellers on eBay and other online storefronts may try to pass off coin rolls as "unsearched" or "original bank wrapped", when in reality the rolls have been opened, seeded with coins that do not belong or are extremely unlikely to be found in a roll, such as mercury dimes in rolls of wheat cents, or Morgan dollars in "bank wrapped rolls" (these coins were never supplied to banks in rolls, instead being sent in cloth money bags, thus meaning that any rolls of Morgan dollars that do exist were rolled by a third party), then sealed shut in an attempt to make them look authentic. These rolls typically contain common and heavily circulated coins of little value, in the hopes that the seeded coins may drive up the value to make a profit.

== Foreign coin scams ==
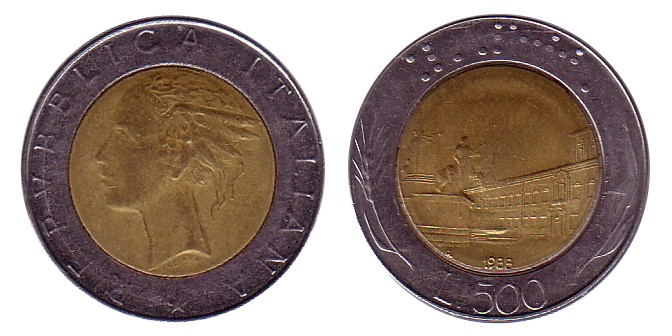
The obsolete 500 Italian Lira coin, which is similar to the 2 Euro coin.

Another possibility is to pad foreign coins into the rolls. Generally cancelled European coins (see Euro) are used. Such coins can often be purchased in bulk at flea markets. Some con artists bank on the fact that the typical customer will recirculate these coins, or keep them for themselves thinking they are valuable.

In the United States, it is not uncommon to find Canadian coins in circulation (and vice versa), although the extent to which this is done deliberately is unknown. It will be more unlikely to find 2 cent euro coin, other foreign pennies. Pennies from 1920 to 2012 and nickels minted between 1982 and 2001, as well as 2006, are very common because their composition is similar to American coins, so coin counting machines can't tell the difference.

Various currencies, including the 500 Italian Lira coin, the 5 South African Rand coin, and the 10 Thai baht coin, are similar to the 2 Euro coin and are sometimes passed off as such, especially to tourists. Even when the Lira was legitimate currency, 500 Lira was only worth €0.26.

== Coin bags ==
In the United Kingdom, and in the Republic of Ireland until 2002, banks do not use coin wrappers. Instead, they provide small plastic bags with a specific coin value free of charge. These are filled by the customer with the appropriate amount of the matching coin. When depositing or changing, the bags are weighed at the bank to check they contain the right amount. The contents of the clear bag are easy for the bank teller to check.

== See also ==
- Confidence trick
