= Fifty-satang coin =

Thai coin

50 salung
- Thailand
- Value: 0.50 Thai baht
- Mass: 2.4 g
- Diameter: 18 mm
- Edge: Reeded
- Composition: Copper-plated-steel core: 99% Fe cladding: 99% Cu
- Years of minting: 1860–Present
- Catalog number: -

Obverse
- Design: King Vajiralongkorn
- Designer: Vudhichai Seangern
- Design date: 2018

Reverse
- Design: Royal Monogram of King Vajiralongkorn
- Designer: Chaiyod Soontrapa
- Design date: 2018

The Thailand fifty-satang coin (50 st. or 50 สต.) is currency unit equivalent to one-half of a Thai baht. It is also called สองสลึง (song salueng - "two salueng" while สลึง salueng is used to describe the 25-satang coin).

In 2008, fifty satang coin was minted both old aluminium series bronze and new copper series.

Obverse of old series 50 satang minted in 2008

Reverse of old series 50 satang minted in 2008
Evolution of 50 satang

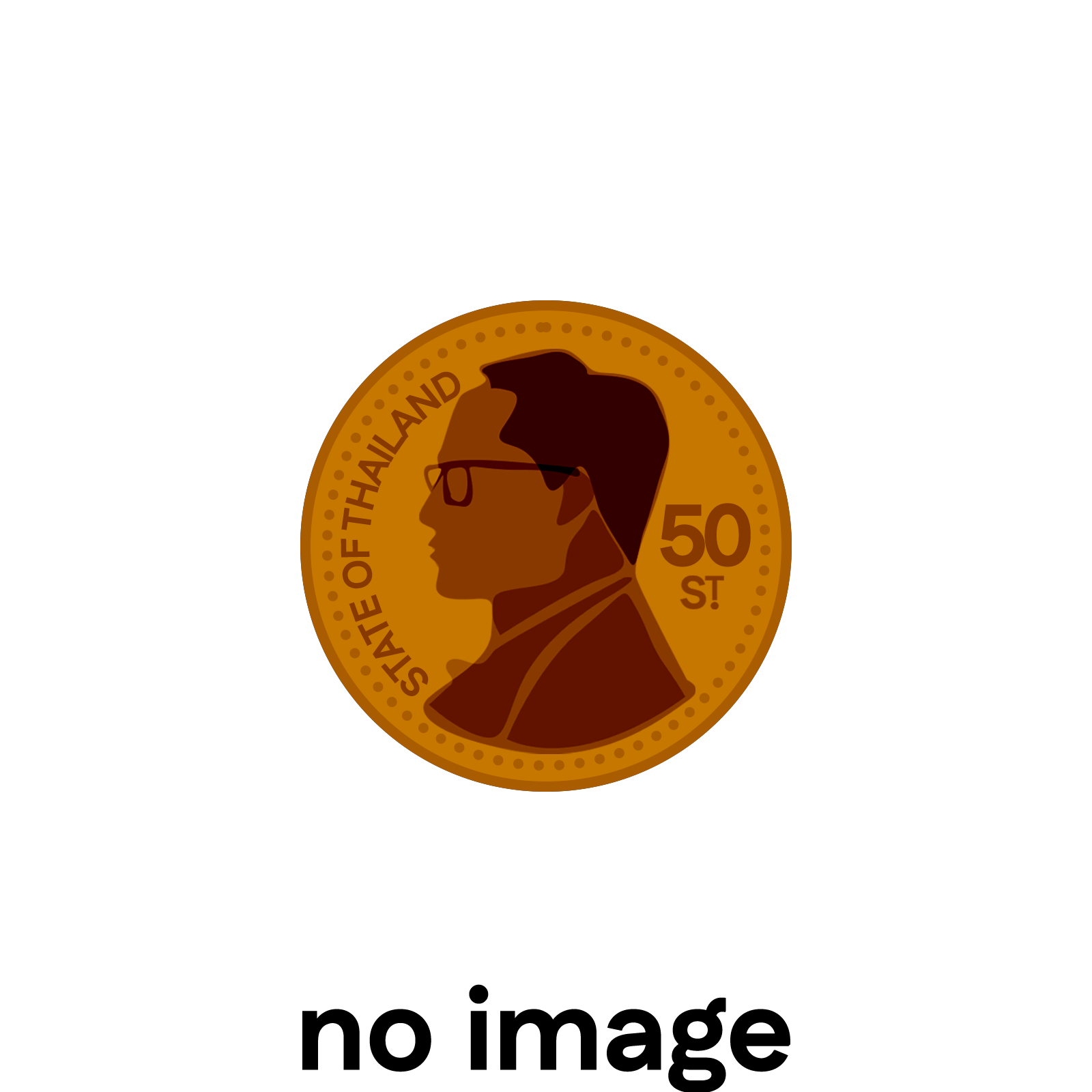
1987

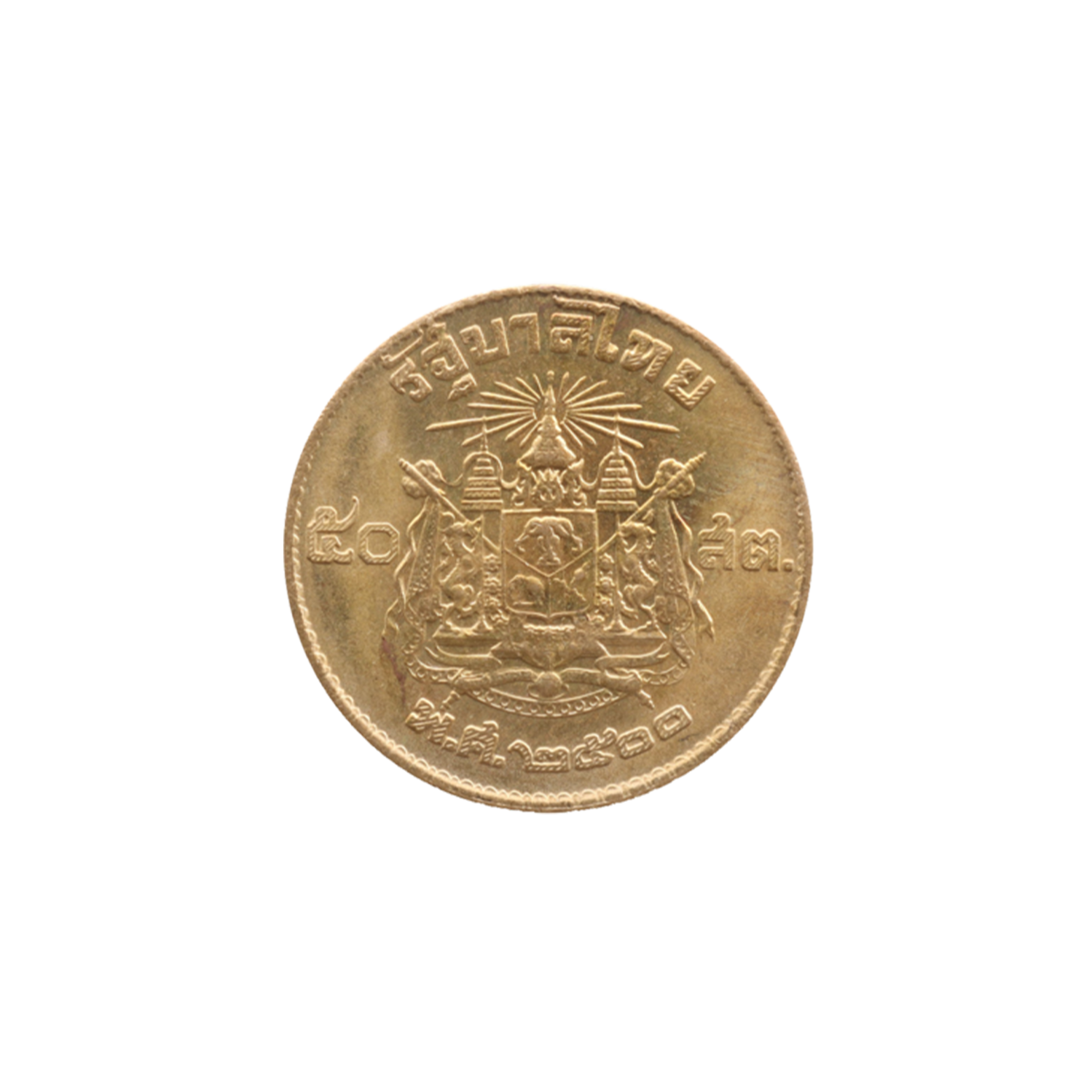
1950

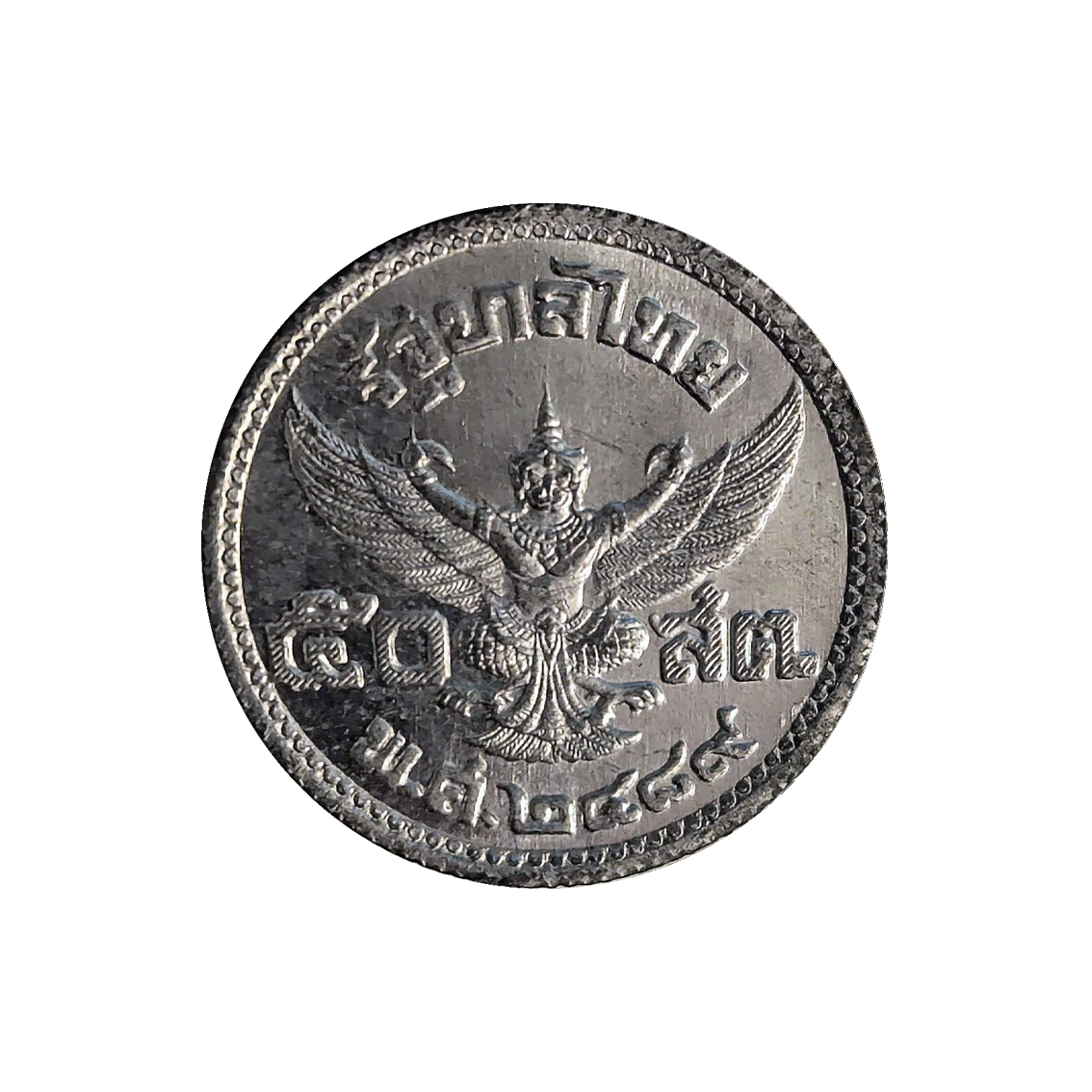
1946

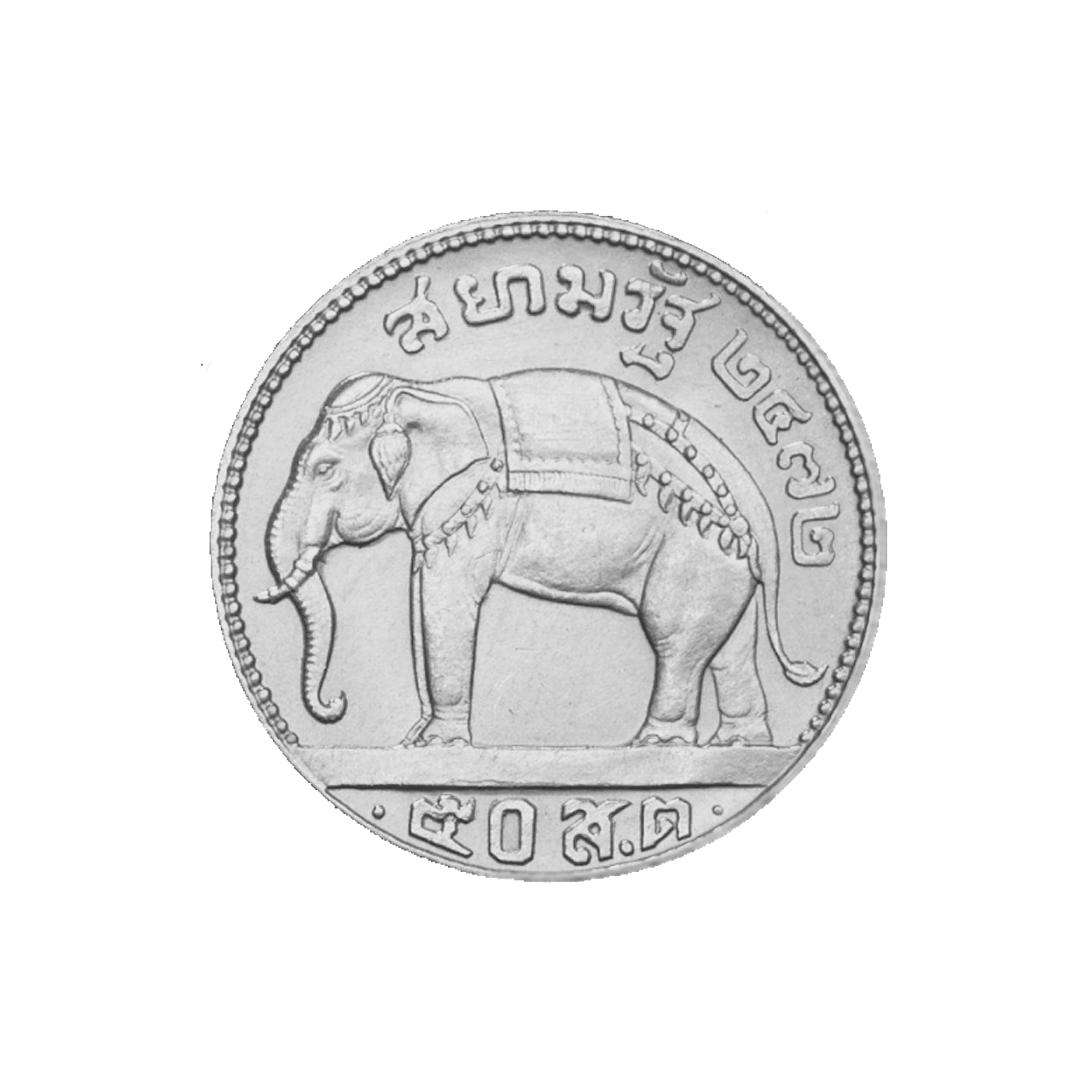
1929

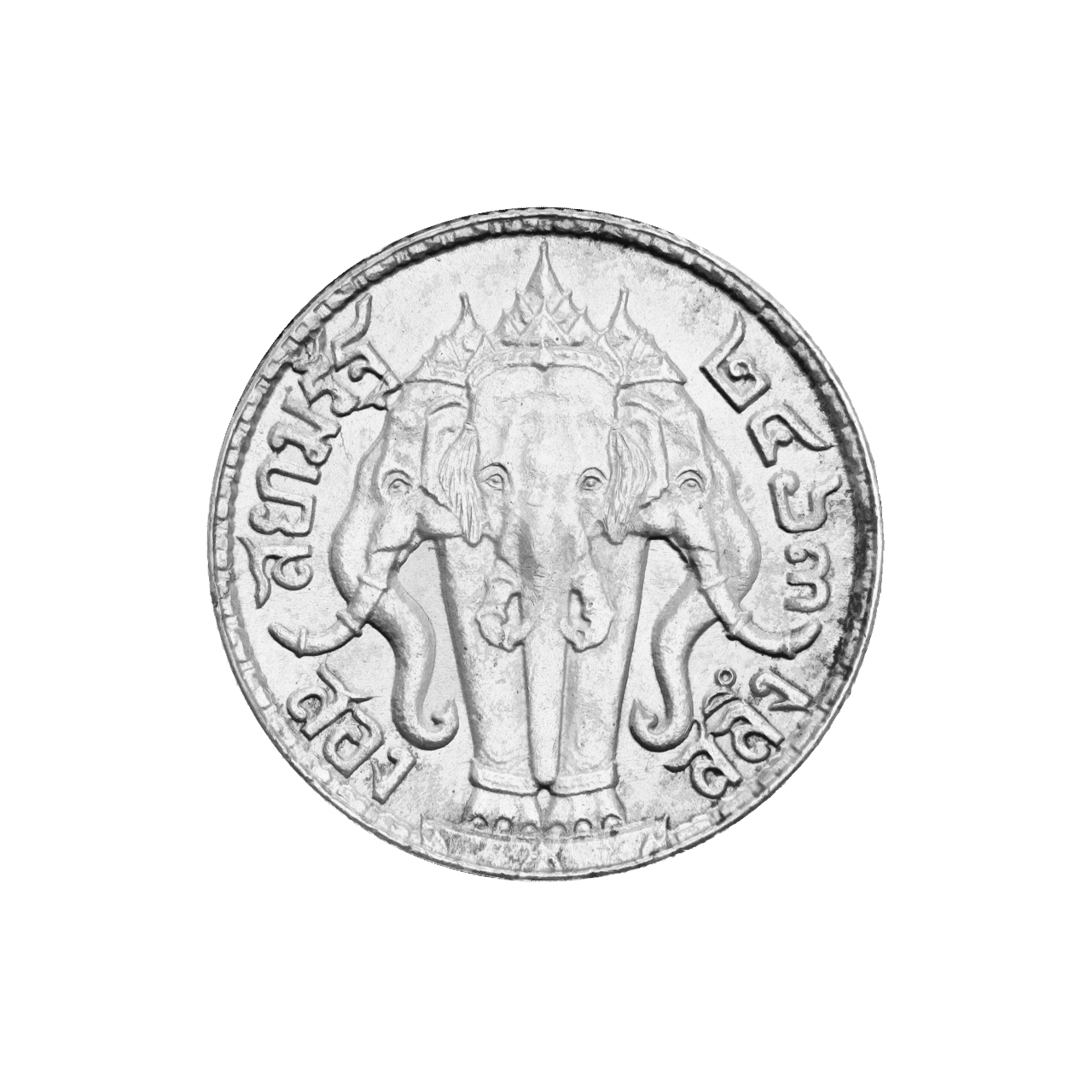
1913

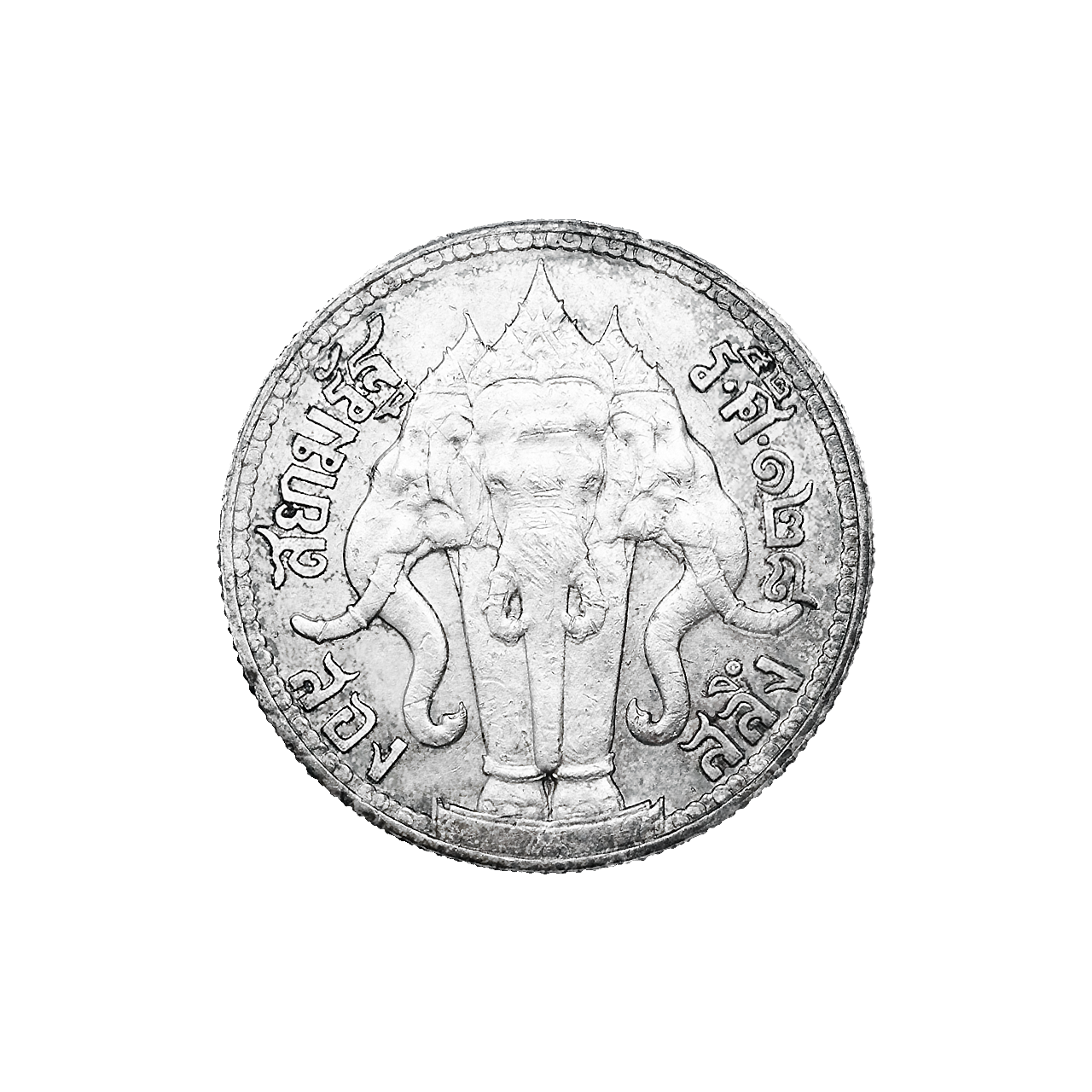
1909

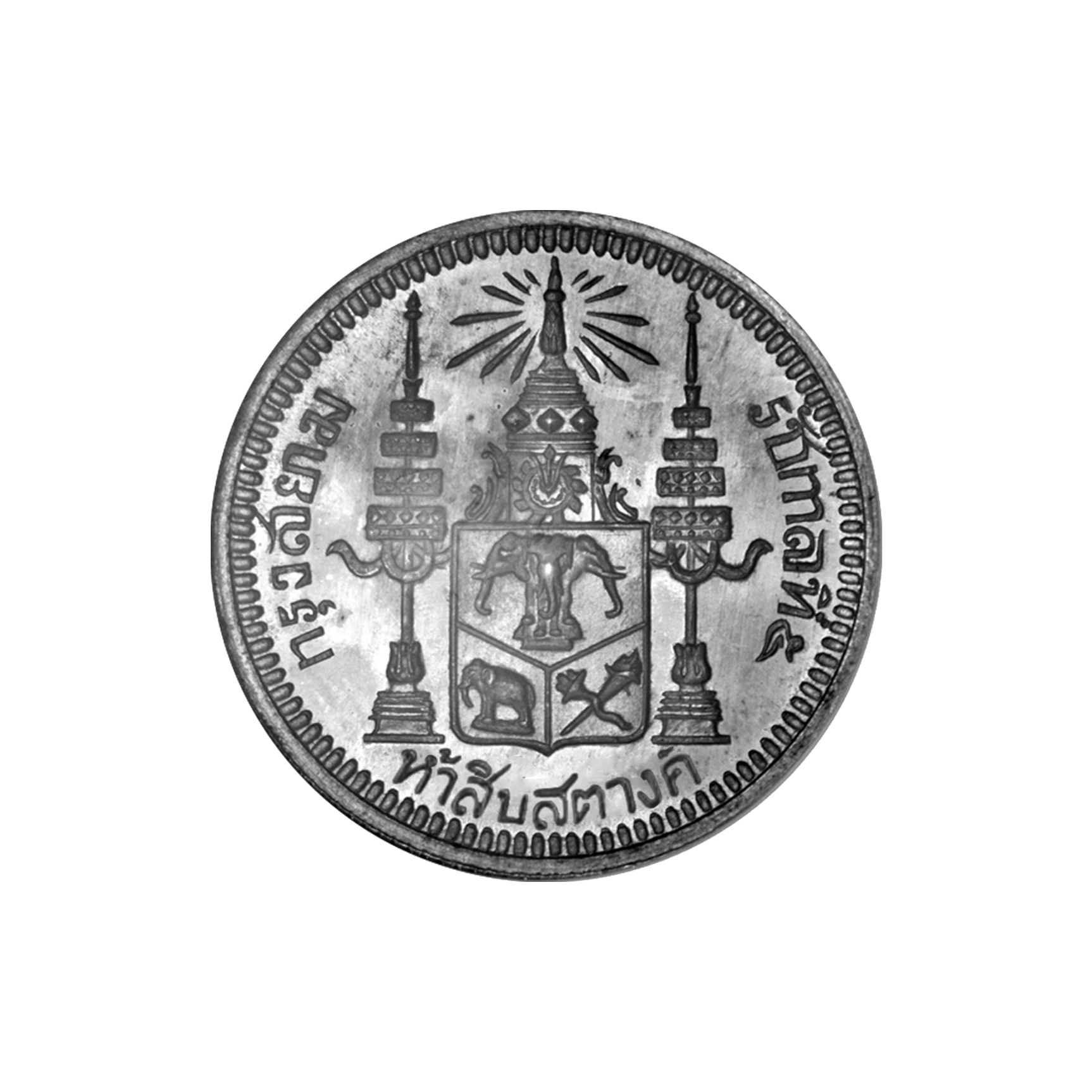
1908

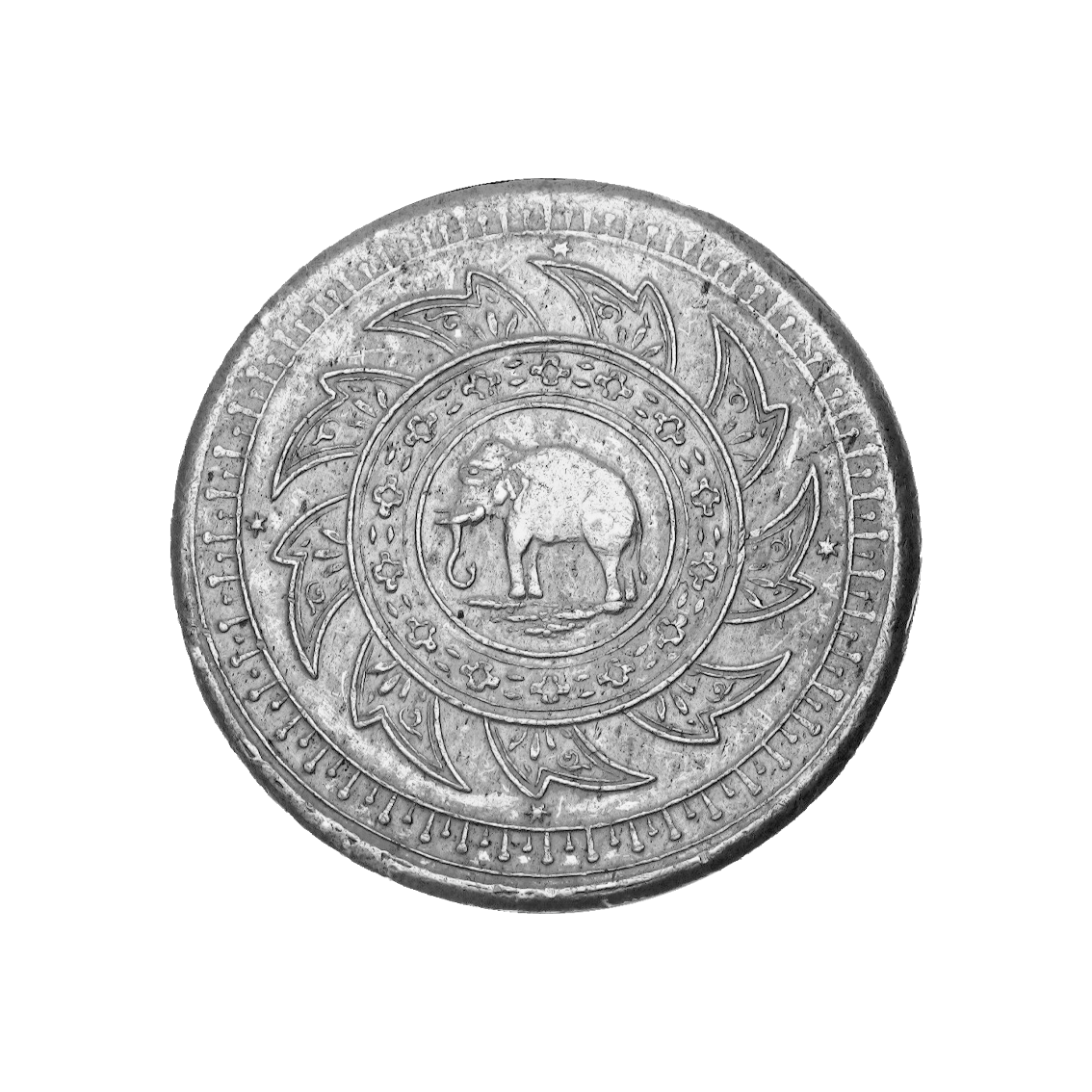
1862

== Mintages ==
- 1987 ~ 1,000
- 1988 ~ 23,775,000
- 1989 ~ 57,969,000
- 1990 ~ 92,960,000
- 1991 ~ 4,660,380
- 1992 ~ 105,451,000
- 1993 ~ 36,296,000
- 1994 ~ 161,172,000
- 1995 ~ 147,670,000
- 1996 ~ 30,840,000
- 1997 ~ 58,336,000
- 1998 ~ 23,834,000
- 1999 ~ 73,379,700
- 2000 ~ 115,332,000
- 2001 ~ 52,738,000
- 2002 ~ 102,804,000
- 2003 ~ 101,200,000
- 2004 ~ 79,596,000
- 2005 ~ 99,920,000
- 2006 ~ 130,803,000
- 2007 ~ 24,905,000
- 2008 (old series) ~ 27,163,509
- 2008 (new series) ~ 225,000,000
- 2009 ~ 118,536,000
