= Coin roll hunting =

Hobby of searching coins pulled from circulation

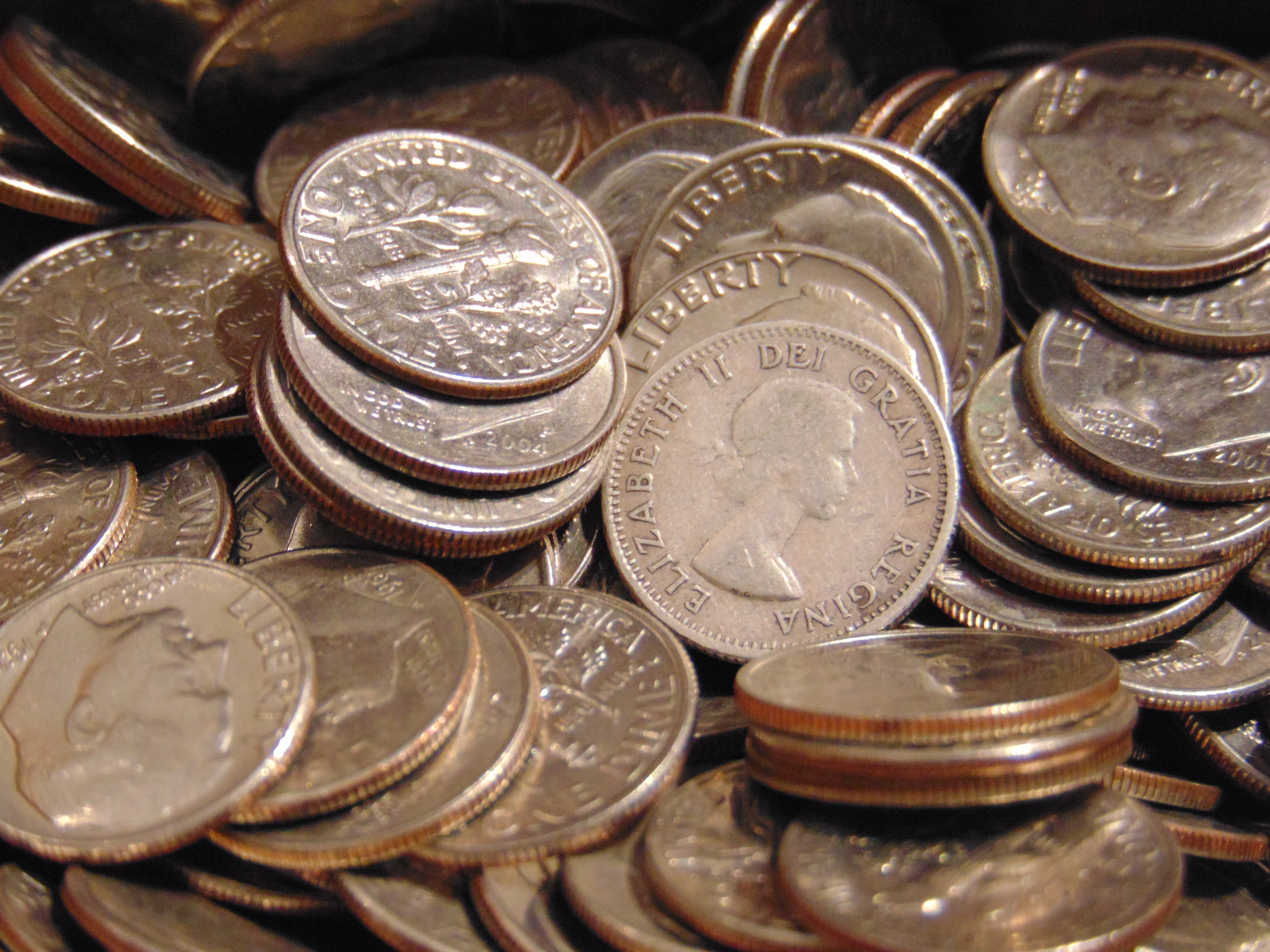
An example of a potential find in coin roll hunting: a silver Canadian dime, found in a box of forty dollars' worth of American dimes

Coin roll hunting (often abbreviated as CRH) is the hobby of searching and sorting coinage pulled from circulation for collectible coins. This is achieved through obtaining rolled coin, boxed coin, or bagged coin from banks and credit unions. A variant of this practice involves banknotes and is carried out in essentially the same fashion, normally to search for unusual (fancy) serial numbers, star notes, and misprints.

== Coin roll hunting in the United States ==
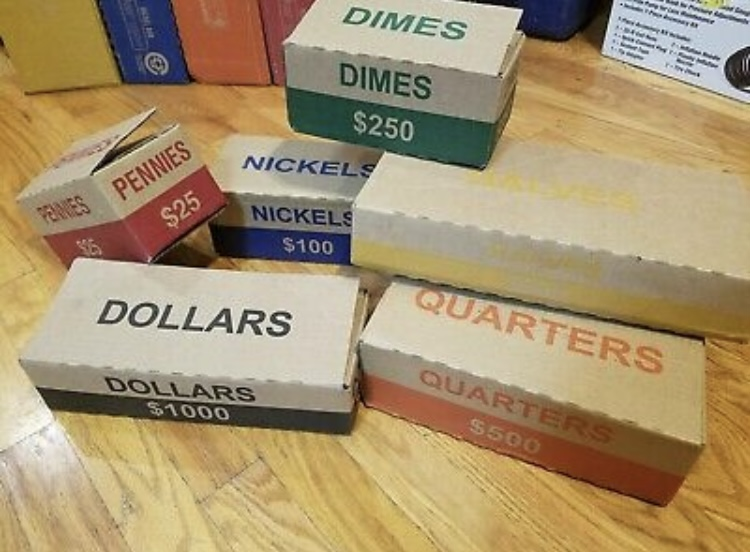
Bank boxes of assorted denominations of coins commonly searched through when coin roll hunting

In the United States, coin roll hunters obtain rolls of pennies, nickels, dimes, quarters, half dollar coins, and sometimes small and large dollar coins, most commonly through withdrawing an amount of money from a bank account in the denomination desired.

Prime targets of American coin roll hunters are silver dimes, quarters, and halves which are all 90% silver prior to 1965, and 40% silver half dollars from 1965–1970. Nickels are searched for 35% silver "war nickels" (1942–1945 with mint marks on top of the Monticello on the reverse). Older discontinued designs such as the Buffalo and Liberty (V) nickels are also collected. Cents are also searched for older designs such as copper wheat cents (1909–1958), war-emergency cents made out of zinc plated steel (in 1943), older Indian head cents (1859–1909), and errors and varieties such as doubled dies and close- and wide-AM cents. Some searchers also save copper memorial Lincoln cents (1959–1982) for their growing value as copper bullion. Toned coins are also of interest to collectors and are occasionally found in coin rolls, particularly on the ends of old bank-wrapped coin rolls. An occasional darkly discolored or corroded nickel, dime, quarter, or half dollar can fool the collector by its edge, giving off the appearance of a silver coin. Often coin roll hunters also collect special proof coins, tokens and other exonumia, and foreign coins. Others attempt to find and complete a set of coins, like the America the Beautiful Quarters, 50 State Quarters, Presidential Dollars, or even every year and mint of regular designs. Other special issues collected by some include the bicentennial quarters and halves (1976), Westward Journey Lewis and Clark nickels (2004–2005), and the lower mintage bicentennial Lincoln cents (2009). Specific dates of specific denominations that are rarer than others or minted in lower-than-usual quantities may also be taken from circulation, such as 1970, 1987, or 2002 to 2020 halves, 2009 nickels and dimes, 2019 and 2020 West Point quarters, or 2002–2008 Sacagawea dollars. Coins of low mintage are known as “semi-key dates”, while very low mintage coins are known as “key dates”. Some famous key date coins include the 1909 S VDB wheat cent, the 1950 D Jefferson nickel, and the 1916 D Mercury dime. People search the rolls for error coins that have defects from the minting process, such as doubled dies, coins struck with wrong planchets, and coins struck off center, etc. These coins can be worth more than face value to collectors, with some, such as the 1955 doubled die cent potentially worth thousands of dollars.

== Coin roll hunting in Canada ==
In Canada, coin roll hunters obtain rolls of nickels, and sometimes dimes and quarters.

Dimes and quarters didn't have high mint numbers until silver was discontinued in the middle of 1968. After 1968, coins were minted in very high numbers, making silver coins uncommon, plus the introduction of silver-rejecting bank machines took many silver coins out of circulation. This all made silver too hard to find for coin roll hunters, so they primarily searched for 1922-1964 nickels for their numismatic value and 1965-1981 Nickels for their metal value, which slightly exceeds their face value. Pre-1997 pennies were also pulled out of circulation due to their copper high metal value prior to the removal of pennies from circulation in 2013. Other roll hunters attempt to build sets of special quarters, loonies, and toonies.

== Coin roll hunting in Australia ==
In Australia, coin roll hunting is often referred to as "noodling" and coin roll hunters often withdraw or exchange 50 cents, 1 dollar or 2 dollar coins as they have the most variety and $1 and $2 coins may consist of coloured coins.

Australia's coin roll hunting usually consists of newer coins of 1966 or later as Australia decimalised its currency in 1966 from Australian Pound to Australian Dollar, although rarely, pre-1966 coins may appear in coin rolls amongst 5c (Sixpence), 10c (Shilling}, 20c (Florin) or 50c (Half-Crown) rolls. Originally, 1966 50c were circular and minted in 80% silver, but this caused confusion with the 20c coin, which was similarly sized and it was uneconomical to produce silver coins. This caused the Royal Australian Mint to continue minting 50c coins from 1969 onwards to be dodecagonal and with copper-nickel. These original 1966 50c coins are now extremely rare to find in circulation and in coin rolls.

$1 and $2 coins were introduced in 1984 and 1988 respectively, so there are more newer coins. There is a misconception that in 1988 and 1989, $2 coins with "HH" (initials of the designer; Horst Hahne) are rare and valuable. In fact, all 1988 and 1989 $2 coins have the "HH" initials engraved on the reverse.

== Merits as a means of making money ==
It is not uncommon for coin roll hunters to search through multiple boxes of coins only to find nothing of value. The amount of silver left in circulation is constantly dwindling, ironically exacerbated by collectors finding and removing circulating silver from the rolls they hunt. The expected return from coin roll hunting varies based on the searched denomination. US quarters and dimes tend to produce the worst as most silver from these denominations has already been pulled from circulation. Cents provide the best returns when collecting pre-1982 copper cents, with the typical cent roll producing around 20% copper to 80% zinc cents. However, the amount of profit from searching cents is much lower due to the lower face value of the coin.

In the United States, it is illegal to melt down cents and nickels, so they cannot be legally redeemed for their metal content.

== See also ==
- Coin rolling scams
- Coin wrapper
- Bank strap
