= Five-baht coin =

Thai currency unit

5 baht
- Thailand
- Value: 5 Thai baht
- Mass: 6 g
- Diameter: 24 mm
- Edge: Plain
- Composition: Cupronickel-clad copper Cladding: 75% Cu, 25% Ni; Core: 99.5% Cu
- Years of minting: 1972–present
- Catalog number: -

Obverse
- Design: King Vajiralongkorn
- Designer: Vudhichai Seangern
- Design date: 2018

Reverse
- Design: Royal Monogram of King Vajiralongkorn
- Designer: Chaiyod Soontrapa
- Design date: 2018

The Thailand five-baht coin is a denomination coin of the Thai baht, the Thai currency unit.

Like all coins in Thailand, its obverse features King of Thailand, Vajiralongkorn Bodindradebayavarangkun, and previously Bhumibol Adulyadej.

== Series ==
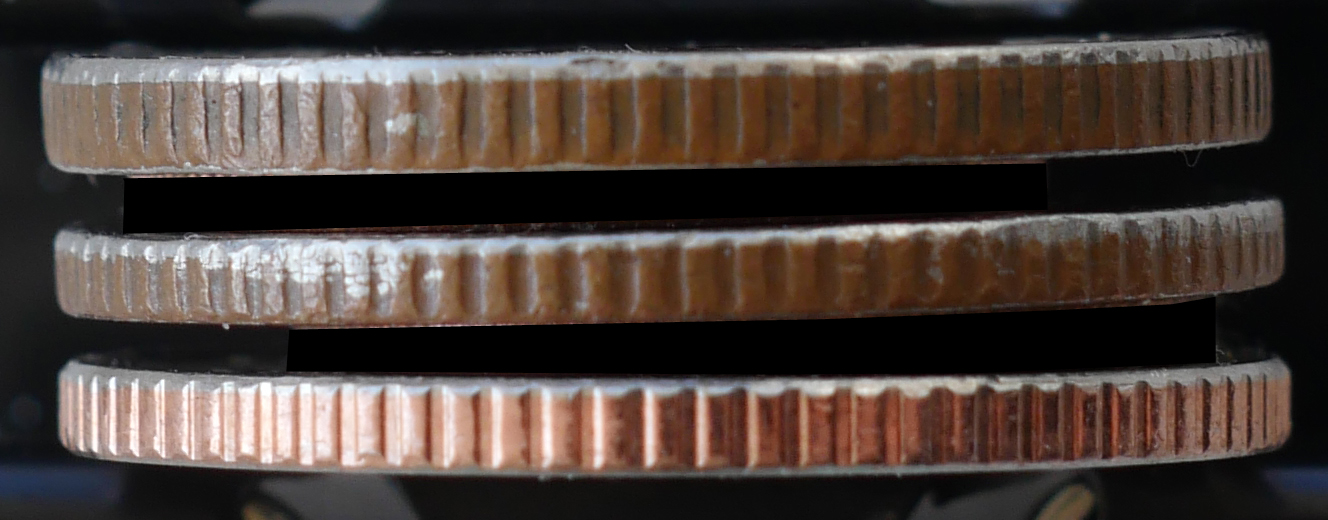
Top to bottom: 2004-coin (thickest), 2015-coin (thinnest) and 2018-coin (a little thicker than the 2015).

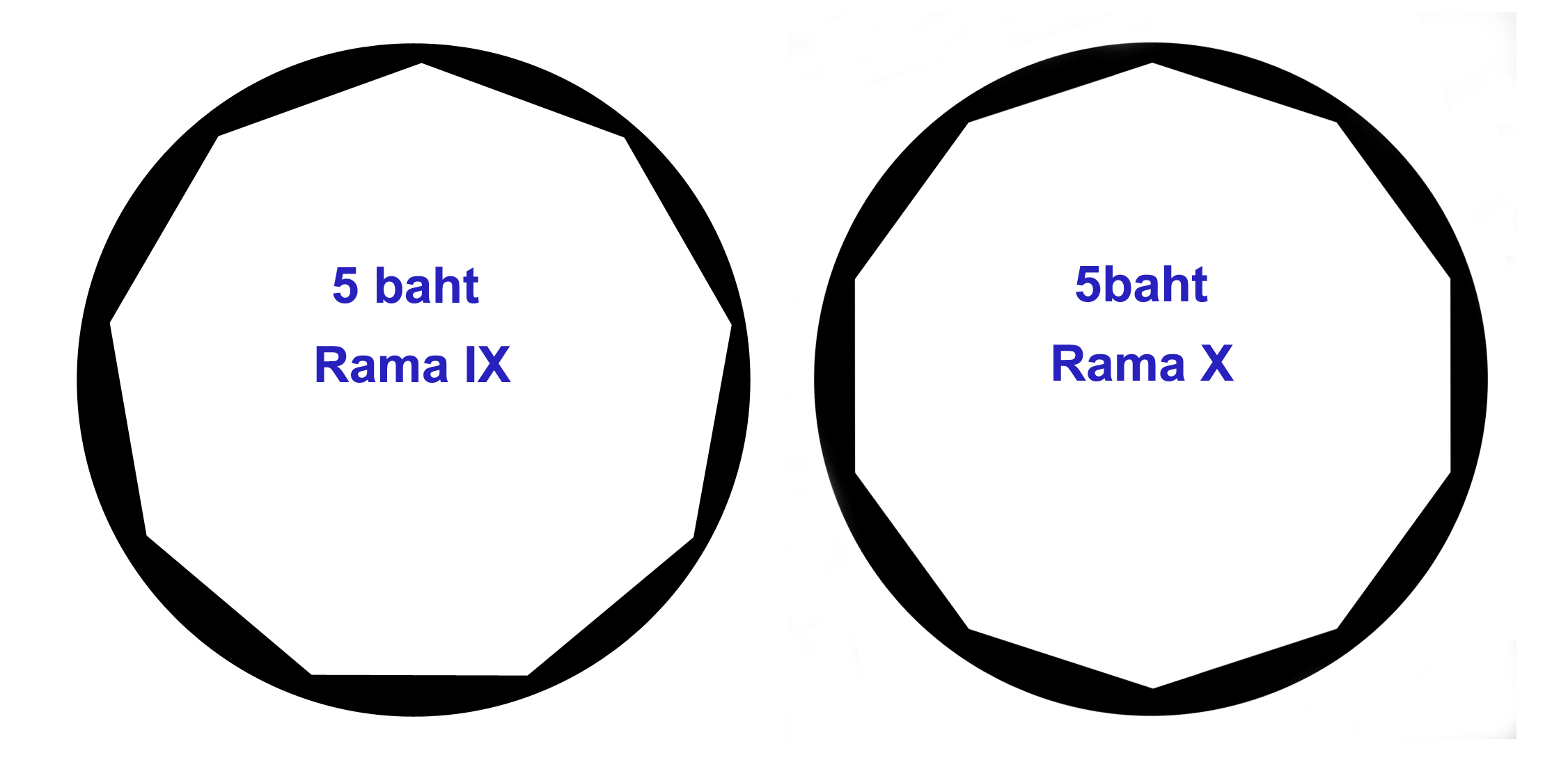
The frame of the Rama IX (left) and Rama X (right) coins.

Evolution of 5 baht

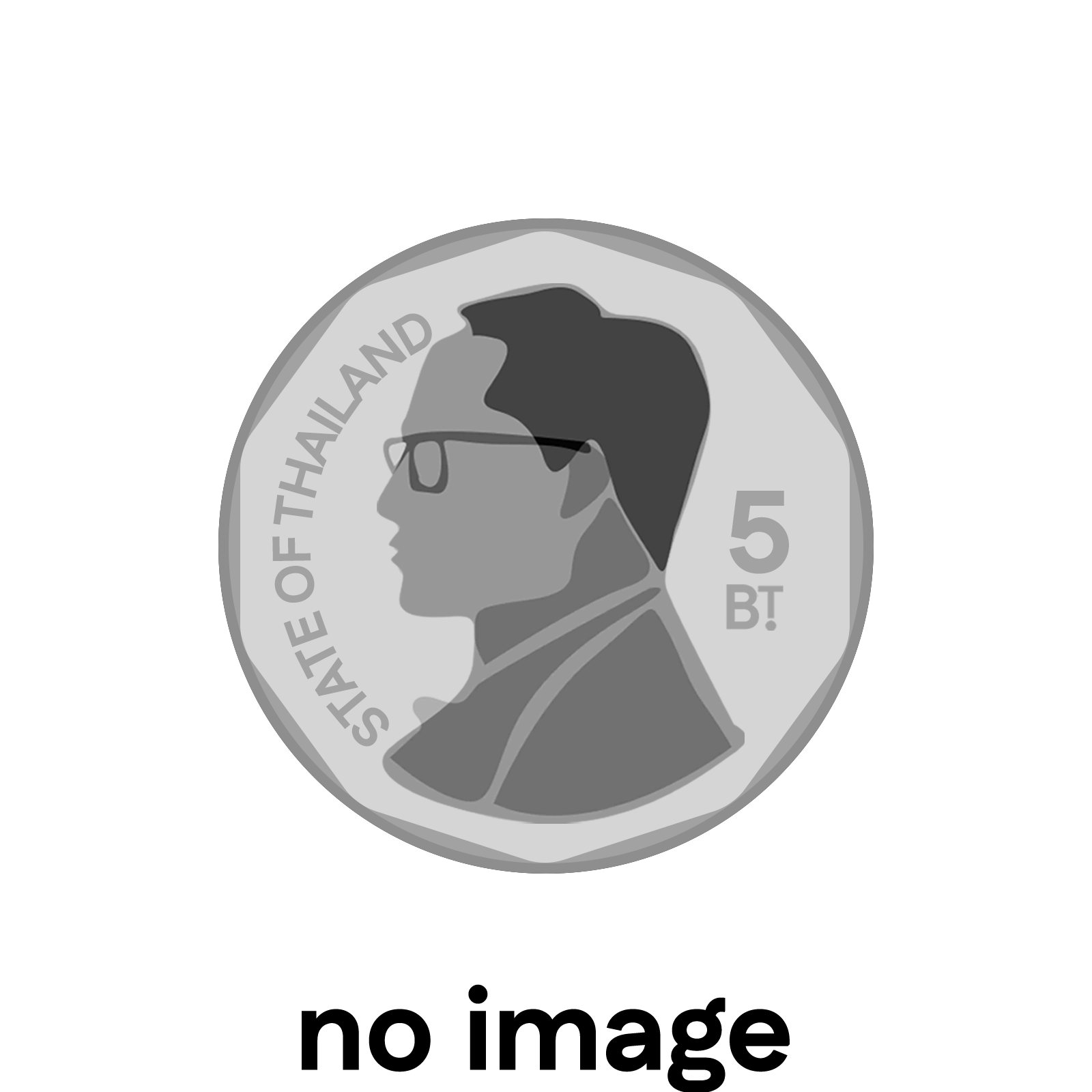
1987

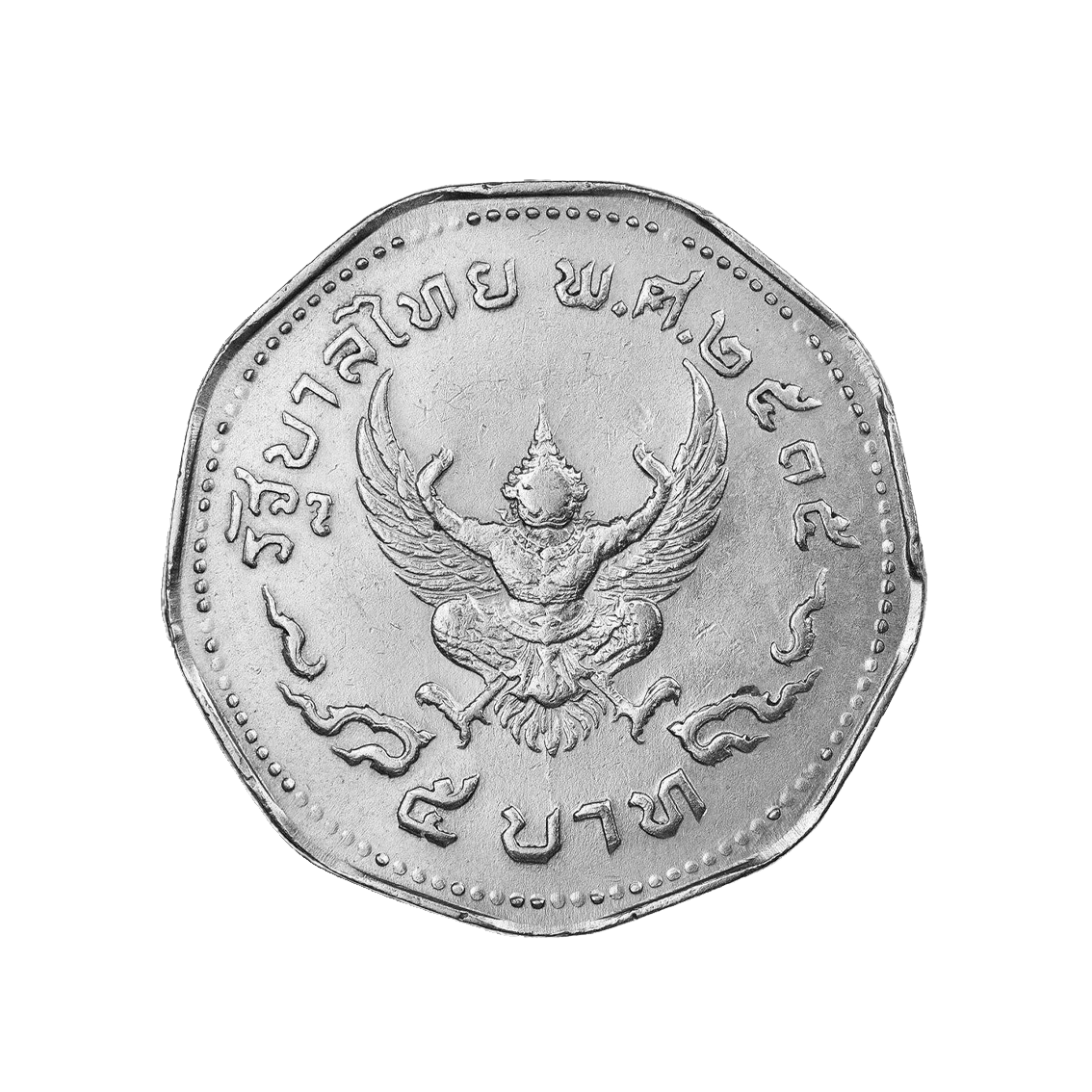
1972

=== 2009 changes ===
On February 2, 2009, the Treasury Department announced changes to several circulating coins. The five-baht coin, which previously weighed 7.5 grams, was reduced to 6 grams by slightly reducing its thickness. Metal composition and other features remain the same as previous issues.

=== 2018 series ===
The Ministry of Finance announced on March 28, 2018, that the first coins featuring the portrait of His Majesty King Maha Vajiralongkorn Bodindradebayavarangkun would be put in circulation on April 6.

== Mintages ==
- 1988 ~ 44,503,000
- 1989 ~ 86,339,000
- 1990 ~ 38,005,000
- 1991 ~ 68,520,380
- 1992 ~ 48,939,620
- 1993 ~ 46,992,000
- 1994 ~ 123,443,000
- 1995 ~ 105,100,000
- 1996 ~ 28,485,000
- 1997 ~ 10,600
- 1998 ~ 31,373,000
- 1999 ~ 50,760,000
- 2000 ~ 125,760,000
- 2001 ~ 100,236,000
- 2002 ~ 37,259,500
- 2003 ~ 182,000
- 2004 ~ 79,088,000
- 2005 ~ 66,679,000
- 2006 ~ 254,702,000
- 2007 ~ 170,275,000
- 2008 (old series) ~ 226,148,200
- 2008 (new series) ~ 17,020,000
- 2009 ~ 289,303,000

== Commemorative issues ==
- the 50th Anniversary of King Bhumibol Adulyadej
- the 8th Asian Games
- Commemoration of the Blessing and Naming Rites of Princess Bajrakitiyabha
- FAO's Ceres Award to the Queen Sirikit
- the 80th Anniversary of Princess Mother Srinagarindra
- Commemoration of the King Prajadhipok's Monument
- the Centenary of the King Vajiravudh
- the Bicentenary of Ratanakosin
- Commemorative of World Food Day
- the 75th Anniversary of World Scout
- the 84th Anniversary of Princess Mother Srinagarindra
- the 5th Cycle Birthday of King Bhumibol Adulyadej
- Rajamagalapisek Royal Ceremony
- the Bicentenary of the King Nangklao
- the 5th Cycle Birthday of the Queen Sirikit
- the 18th SEA Games
- the 50th Anniversary Celebrations of the King Bhumibol Adulyadej's Accession

== See also ==
- Thai baht
