= Commemorative coins of Azerbaijan =

Commemorative and jubilee coins are issued by the Central Bank of the Republic of Azerbaijan from precious and base metals. The first coin was dedicated to the 500th anniversary of the life and work of Muhammad Fuzuli in 1996.

Due to the lack of a mint in the country, all coins have been minted in countries such as UK, Ukraine, Austria and Poland.

== Commemorative Coins Dedicated to Famous Historical Figures ==
The following table lists the commemorative coins dedicated to the anniversaries of the lives and activities of famous historical figures of Azerbaijan. The coins are worth 50, 100 and 500 AZN.

Name	Year	Denomination	Fineness	Volume	Image	Commemorative subject
500th anniversary of the life and work of Muhammad Fizuli	1996	100 AZN	916.7	500		In 1996, for the first time, the National Bank issued a gold coin worth 100 manatsdedicated to the 500th anniversary of the life and creativity of the Azerbaijani poet and thinker Muhammad Fuzuli (1494-1556). The obverse of the commemorative coin shows the face of Fuzuli, and the reverse a scene from the poet's famous poem "Leyli and Majnun". The commemorative coin was minted at the Royal Mint in Great Britain in accordance with international standards.
Gold coins, devoted to the 1300th anniversary of the book "Kitabi Dada Gorgud"	1999	100 AZN	900	5000		In 1999 gold coins worth 100 manat devoted to the 1300th anniversary of "Kitabi Dada Gorgud" epic were issued. The commemorative coin was minted at the mint of the National Bank of Ukraine according to international standards.
Silver coins, devoted to the 1300th anniversary of the book "Kitabi Dada Gorgud"	1999	50 AZN	925	150		In 1999, silver coins worth of 50 AZN, devoted to the 1300th anniversary of the "Kitabi Dada Gorgud" epic, were issued. The commemorative coin was minted at the mint of National Bank of Ukraine.
Platinum coins dedicated to the memory of Heydar Aliyev	2004	500 AZN	platinum	100		The Central Bank of the Republic of Azerbaijan issued platinum commemorative coins on December 10, 2004, in accordance with the decree of the President of the Republic of Azerbaijan on perpetuating the memory of the Heydar Alirza oglu Aliyev. On the face of the commemorative coins there is a portrait of Heydar Aliyev. On the right side of the portrait - the words "Heydar Aliyev" was inscribed. On the reverse side of there is the map of the Republic of Azerbaijan. The commemorative coins were minted at the Royal Mint of England in accordance with the highest international standards.
Gold coins dedicated to the memory of Heydar Aliyev	2004	100 AZN	916.7	1000		The Central Bank of the Republic of Azerbaijan issued gold commemorative coins on December 10, 2004, in accordance with the decree of the President of the Republic of Azerbaijan on perpetuating the memory of Heydar Alirza oglu Aliyev. On the face of the commemorative coins there is a portrait of Heydar Aliyev and on the right side of the portrait, the words "Heydar Aliyev" were inscribed. On the reverse side of there is the map of the Republic of Azerbaijan. The commemorative coins were minted at the Royal Mint of England.
Silver coins dedicated to the memory of Heydar Aliyev	2004	50 AZN	925	2000		The Central Bank of the Republic of Azerbaijan issued a commemorative silver coin on December 10, 2004, in accordance with the decree of the President of the Republic of Azerbaijan on perpetuating the memory of Heydar Alirza oglu Aliyev. On the face of the commemorative coins there is a portrait of Heydar Aliyev. On the right side of the portrait the words "Heydar Aliyev" were inscribed. On the reverse side there is the map of the Republic of Azerbaijan. The commemorative coins were minted at the Royal Mint of England.
Gold coins dedicated to the memory of Nizami Ganjavi	2008	100 AZN	999	500		800th anniversary of Nizami Ganjavi's death. The coins were struck at Austrian Mint.
Gold coins Dedicated to Bulbul	2008	100 AZN	999	500		The coins were dedicated to Bulbul who was a famous Azerbaijani and Soviet opera tenor, folk music performer, and one of the founders of vocal arts and national musical theatre in Azerbaijan. They were struck at Austrian Mint.
Gold coins Dedicated to Uzeyir Hajibeyov	2008	100 AZN	999	500		The coins were struck at Austrian Mint. Its weight is 31.1 g and has a round shape.

== Commemorative Coins, New Gepiks ==
In 2006, Azerbaijani Government signed a contract with the Austrian Mint one of world's coin produces to design a set of gold coins related with the denomination process. According to the agreement, 50 special gold commemorative sets were prepared in 2005. Coins of denomination of 1, 3, 5, 10, 20 and 50 gepiks were struck at Austrian Mint.

Name	Year	Bullion Value	Composition	Fineness	Volume	Description	Image
1 Gepik	2005	585.80 AZN	Gold. 7.10 g	999.9	50	Obverse; Culture-traditional Musical instruments Reverse; Map of Azerbaijan	
3 Gepik	2005	726.06 AZN	Gold. 8.80 g	999.9	50	Obverse; Books and quill Reverse; Map of Azerbaijan	
5 Gepik	2005	882.82 AZN	Gold. 10.70 g	999.9	50	Obverse; The Maiden Tower Reverse; Map of Azerbaijan	
10 Gepik	2005	1,076.71 AZN	Gold. 13.05 g	999.9	50	Obverse; Military helmet symbolizing the desire to regain Nagorno-Karabakh Reverse; Map of Azerbaijan	
20 Gepik	2005	1,307.73 AZN	Gold. 15.85 g	999.9	50	Obverse; Spiral staircase, and Geometry & Geometrical symbols Reverse; Map of Azerbaijan	
50 Gepik	2005	1,452.11 AZN	Gold. 17.60 g	999.9	50	Obverse; Two oil wells Reverse; Map of Azerbaijan	

== Coins dedicated to "European Games 2015" ==
The commemorative coins mentioned below has been dedicated to First European Games that took place in 2015, in Baku.

Name	Year	Value	Composition	Fineness	Volume	Description	Image
1 Manat Archery	2015	1 AZN	Copper-nickel	.	1500	Obverse; Archer. Lettering: BAKU 2015 I AVROPA OYUNLARI Reverse; National Coat of Arms, crescent and ornaments.	
1 Manat (Canoe Sprint)	2015	1 AZN	Copper-nickel	.	1500	Obverse; Rower on a canoe Reverse; National Coat of Arms, crescent and ornaments. Lettering: AZƏRBAYCAN RESPUBLİKASI 1 MANAT	.
1 Manat (Diving)	2015	1 AZN	Copper-nickel	.	1500	Obverse; Diver. Lettering: AZƏRBAYCAN RESPUBLİKASI 1 MANAT. Reverse; National Coat of Arms, crescent and ornaments	.
1 Manat (Rhythmic Gymnastics)	2015	1 AZN	Copper-nickel	.	1500	Obverse; Gymnast Lettering: AZƏRBAYCAN RESPUBLİKASI 1 MANAT Reverse; National Coat of Arms, crescent and ornaments.	.
1 Manat (Wrestling)	2015	1 AZN	Copper-nickel	.	1500	Obverse; Two wrestlers Lettering: BAKU 2015 I AVROPA OYUNLARI Reverse; National Coat of Arms, crescent and ornaments.	.
5 Manat (Archery)	2015	5 AZN	Silver	999	100	Obverse; Archer. Lettering: BAKU 2015 I AVROPA OYUNLARI Reverse; National Coat of Arms, crescent and ornaments.	
5 Manat (Canoe Sprint)	2015	5 AZN	Silver	999	100	Obverse; Rower on a canoe Reverse; National Coat of Arms, crescent and ornaments. Lettering: AZƏRBAYCAN RESPUBLİKASI 1 MANAT	
5 Manat (Diving)	2015	5 AZN	Silver	999	100	Obverse; Diver. Lettering: AZƏRBAYCAN RESPUBLİKASI 1 MANAT. Reverse; National Coat of Arms, crescent and ornaments	
5 Manat (Rhythmic Gymnastics)	2015	5 AZN	Silver	999	100	Obverse; Gymnast Lettering: AZƏRBAYCAN RESPUBLİKASI 1 MANAT Reverse; National Coat of Arms, crescent and ornaments.	
5 Manat (Wrestling)	2015	5 AZN	Silver	999	100	Obverse; Two wrestlers Lettering: BAKU 2015 I AVROPA OYUNLARI Reverse; National Coat of Arms, crescent and ornaments.	
100 Manat (Archery)	2015	100 AZN	Gold	999	100	Obverse; Archer. Lettering: BAKU 2015 I AVROPA OYUNLARI Reverse; National Coat of Arms, crescent and ornaments.	
100 Manat (Canoe Sprint)	2015	100 AZN	Gold	999	100	Obverse; Rower on a canoe Reverse; National Coat of Arms, crescent and ornaments. Lettering: AZƏRBAYCAN RESPUBLİKASI 1 MANAT	
100 Manat (Diving)	2015	100 AZN	Gold	999	100	Obverse; Diver. Lettering: AZƏRBAYCAN RESPUBLİKASI 1 MANAT. Reverse; National Coat of Arms, crescent and ornaments	
100 Manat (Rhythmic Gymnastics)	2015	100 AZN	Gold	999	100	Obverse; Gymnast Lettering: AZƏRBAYCAN RESPUBLİKASI 1 MANAT Reverse; National Coat of Arms, crescent and ornaments.	
100 Manat (Wrestling)	2015	100 AZN	Gold	999	100	Obverse; Two wrestlers Lettering: BAKU 2015 I AVROPA OYUNLARI Reverse; National Coat of Arms, crescent and ornaments.	
