= Vienna Philharmonic (coin) =

Bullion coin of gold, silver, or platinum

- Austria
- Edge: Smooth
- Composition: 99.99% gold, 99.95% platinum, 99.9% silver
- Years of minting: 1989–present

Obverse
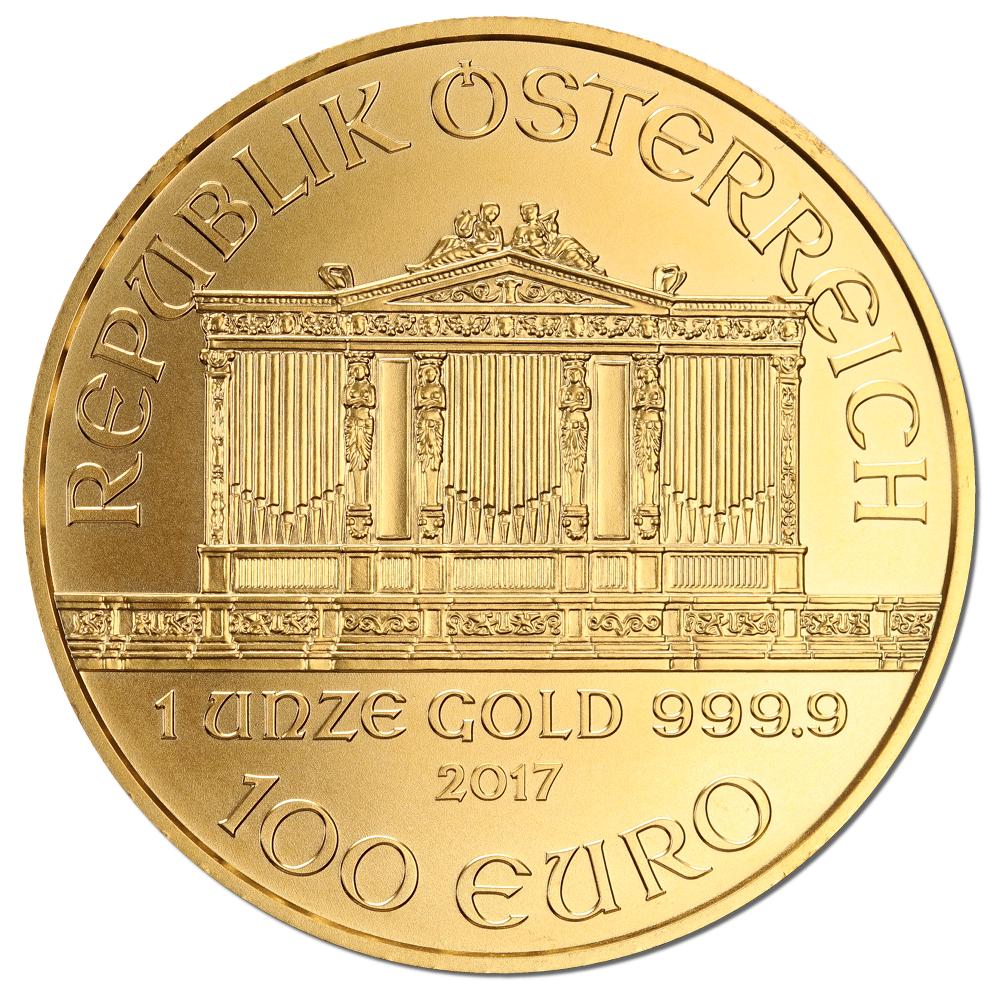
- Design: Musikverein Pipe Organ
- Designer: Thomas Pesendorfer
- Design date: 1989

Reverse
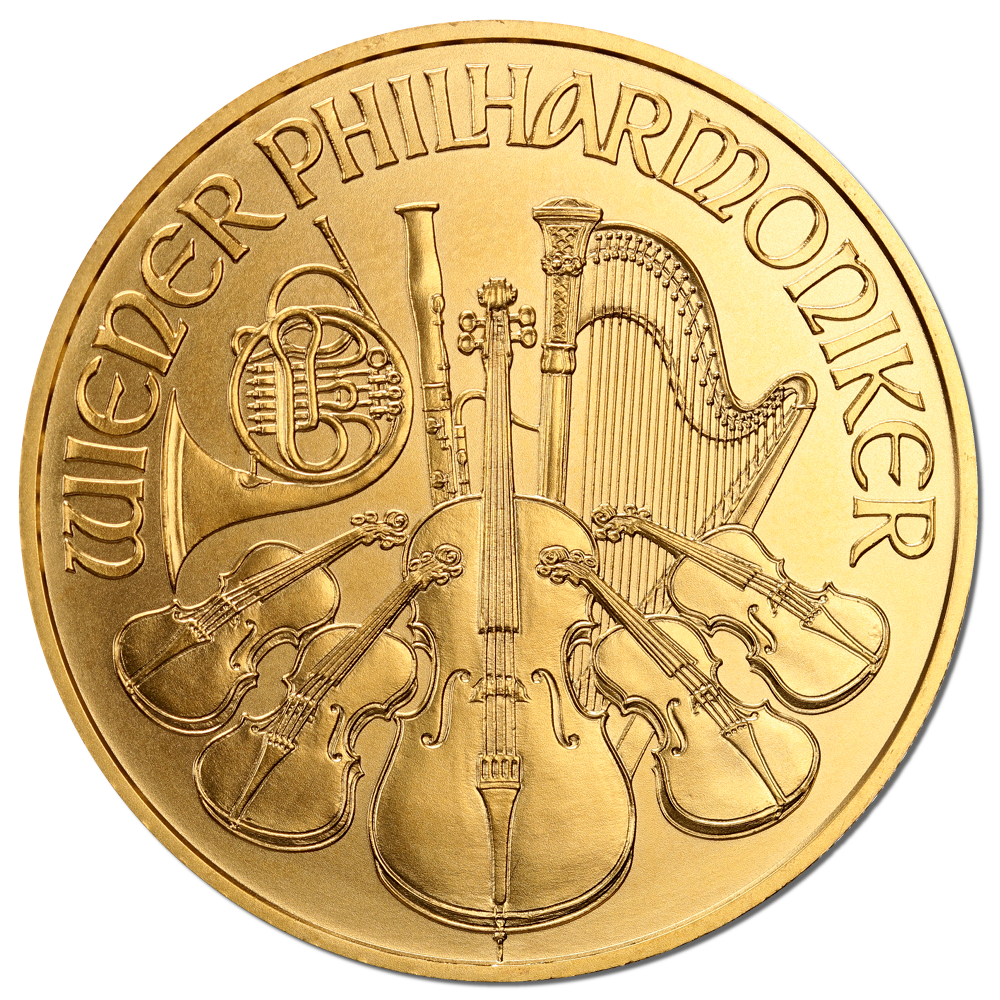
- Design: Orchestra instruments
- Designer: Thomas Pesendorfer
- Design date: 1989

The Vienna Philharmonic (German: Wiener Philharmoniker), often shortened to Philharmonic, is a bullion coin of gold, silver, or platinum produced by the Austrian Mint (Münze Österreich). The coin is named for the Vienna Philharmonic orchestra, which inspired the design of both sides. It was introduced in 1989, as a one-troy ounce (ozt) gold coin with a face value of 2,000 Austrian schillings. It is one of the world's best selling bullion coins. In 2002, with the adoption of the euro currency, the nominal value of the one-ounce coin was changed to 100 euros. In 2008, the Mint introduced a one-ounce silver version of the coin with a nominal value of 1.5 euros. The silver coin is also one of the top selling bullion coins, ranked third in 2013. In 2016, the mint introduced a one-ounce platinum coin with a face value of 100 euros.

Like any bullion coin, the value is based primarily on the metal content and the spot price of that metal on the commodities markets. The gold Philharmonic has a fineness of 999.9 (often written 0.9999, also known as 24 karat or 99.99% pure). In most countries in Europe, the gold Philharmonic is traded VAT-free while the Silver Philharmonic is partly subject to a reduced VAT rate. The coins are minted according to demand and production varies from year to year accordingly. The design on the coin remains the same each year; only the year of issue changes. From the outset, the obverse of the coin depicts the pipe organ in the Vienna Musikverein's Golden Hall. The reverse of the coin shows instruments of the Vienna Philharmonic, including Vienna horn, bassoon, harp, and four violins centered on a cello. Both designs were produced by the Chief Engraver of the Austrian Mint, Thomas Pesendorfer.

== History ==
In November 1988, the Austrian Mint was authorized to produce one-ounce and fractional-ounce gold bullion coins by the Austrian National Council. The gold Vienna Philharmonic was first offered on October 10, 1989, and was initially minted in two sizes: one-ounce and one-quarter ounce. The one-tenth and one-half ounce coins were added in 1991 and 1994 respectively. All coins feature the same design with the only difference being the weight and face value shown. The popularity of the Vienna Philharmonic grew quickly: in 1990, the coin was the best selling in Europe and second in the world. In 1992, 1995, 1996 and 2000 the World Gold Council declared it the best-selling gold coin in the world. Since its introduction in October 1989 up to 2012, more than 14 million Philharmonics have been sold for a total weight of 9.6 million ounces or approximately 329 tons of gold.

After the introduction of the euro, Philharmonics began to be minted with a face value denominated in the new currency starting in 2002. Since February 1, 2008, a one-ounce silver version of the coin with a nominal value of 1.5 euros has been issued, struck from 99.9 percent pure silver. Coins are shipped in boxes of 500, called "monster boxes". Each monster box consists of 25 tubes of 20 coins each. Sales of the silver Philharmonic have been brisk with over five million coins sold, equal to 1,800 tons of silver in the 5-year period of 2008 through 2012.

The mint introduced a one-ounce platinum coin with the same design as the gold and silver in 2016. Like the gold coin, it has a face value of 100 euros. The purity is shown as 999.5 with the obverse of the coin reading "1 UNZE PLATIN 999.5."

The Vienna Philharmonic is currently the only European bullion coin with a face value in euros, although it is only legal tender in Austria. In 2004, the Vienna Philharmonic accounted for 35 to 40% of sales in Europe. It is also popular in Japan and North America. In 2022, the Vienna Philharmonic gold coin was the top-selling bullion gold coin in Japan and Europe.

For the 25th anniversary of the Vienna Philharmonic gold coin, the mint introduced the 1/25-ounce coin featuring the same design, but with a face value of 4 euros. Also for the anniversary, 5,000 proof sets of the one-ounce and one-quarter ounce coins were produced. The 1/25-ounce coin has been continued in production.

== Design ==
The design for the coin was originally created by Thomas Pesendorfer to be used for the gold Vienna Philharmonic that was first issued in 1989. The Austrian Mint introduced the silver version of the coin in 2008. The design was unchanged and has remained the same each year.

The obverse features the ornate case of the pipe organ from Golden Hall in the Musikverein, the concert hall in Vienna where the namesake orchestra plays. The German words "REPUBLIK ÖSTERREICH" (Republic of Austria), the composition and the weight are also minted on the obverse. The reverse design features an array of musical instruments, including: a harp, violins, a cello, a bassoon and a Vienna horn. The words "WIENER PHILHARMONIKER" (Vienna Philharmonic) is also inscribed, as well as "SILBER" (Silver) or "PLATIN" (Platinum) on the respective coins.

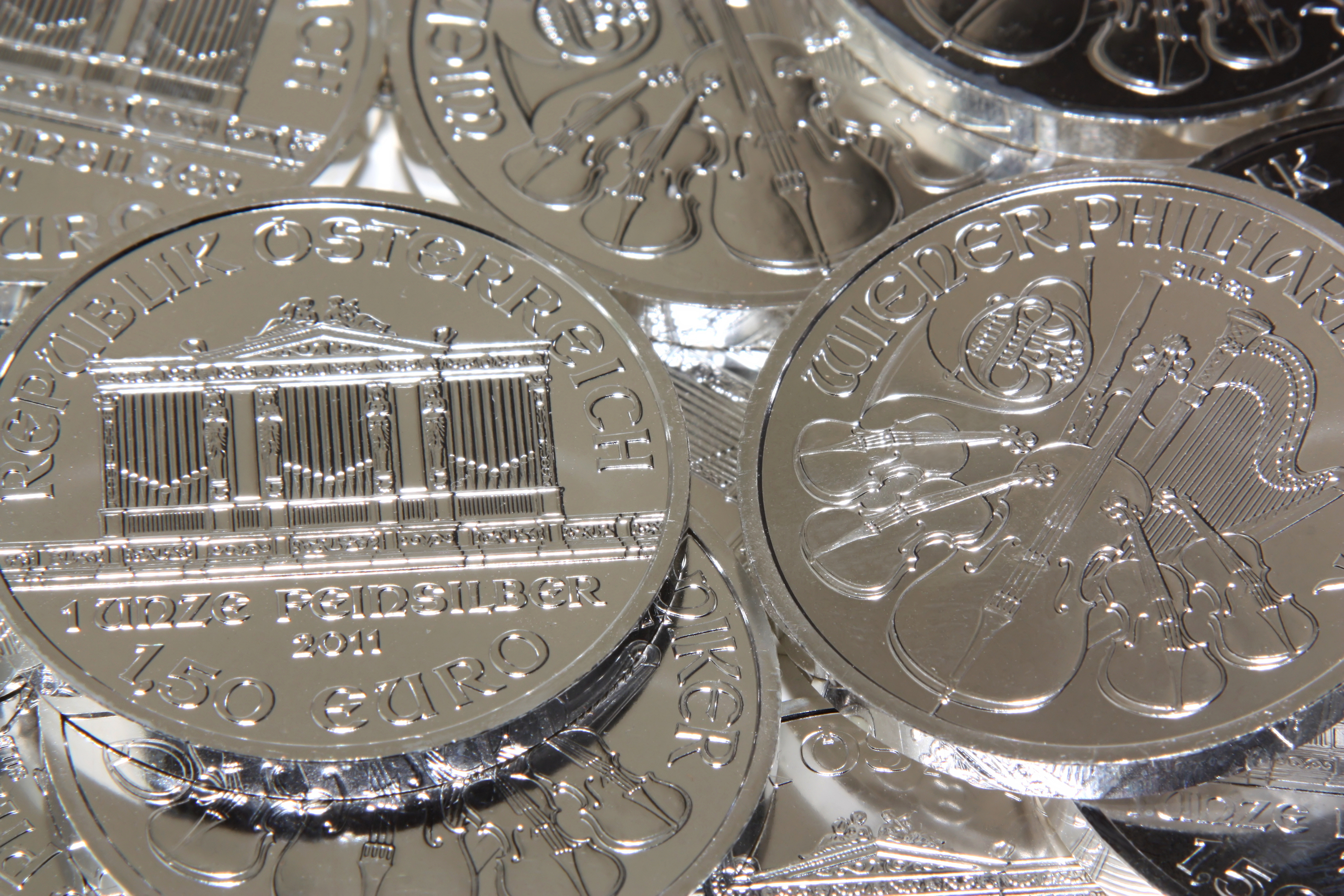
Silver Philharmonic coins

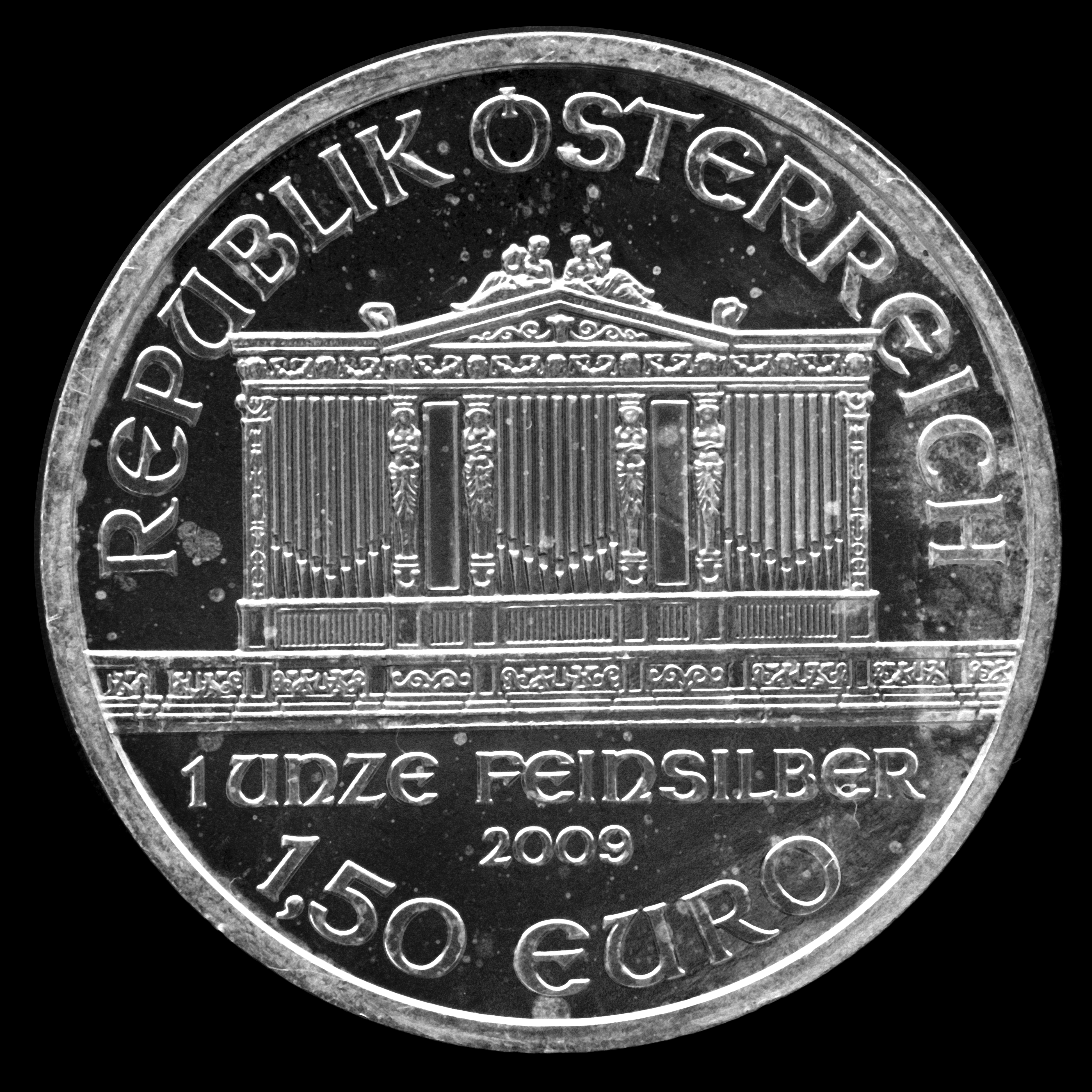
Obverse of silver Philharmonic

Gold Philharmonic specifications:

Size	Diameter	Thickness	Weight	Face value		Years minted
1/25 ozt	13.0 mm (0.5 in)		1.2441 g	4 euros		from 2014
1/10 ozt	16.0 mm (0.6 in)	1.2 mm (0.05 in)	3.121 g	10 euros	200 schillings	from 1991
1/4 ozt	22.0 mm (0.9 in)	1.2 mm (0.05 in)	7.776 g	25 euros	500 schillings	from 1989
1/2 ozt	28.0 mm (1.1 in)	1.6 mm (0.06 in)	15.552 g	50 euros	1,000 schillings	from 1994
1 ozt	37.0 mm (1.5 in)	2.0 mm (0.08 in)	31.103 g	100 euros	2,000 schillings	from 1989

Silver Philharmonic specifications:

Size	Diameter	Thickness	Weight	Face value	Years minted
1 ozt	37.0 mm (1.5 in)	3.2 mm (0.13 in)	31.103 g	1.5 euros	from 2008

Platinum Philharmonic specifications:

Size	Diameter	Thickness	Weight	Face value	Years minted
1/25 ozt	13.0 mm (0.5 in)		1.24 g	4 euros	from 2017
1 ozt	37.0 mm (1.5 in)	1.35 mm (0.05 in)	31.10 g	100 euros	from 2016

== Variations ==
=== "Big Phil" ===
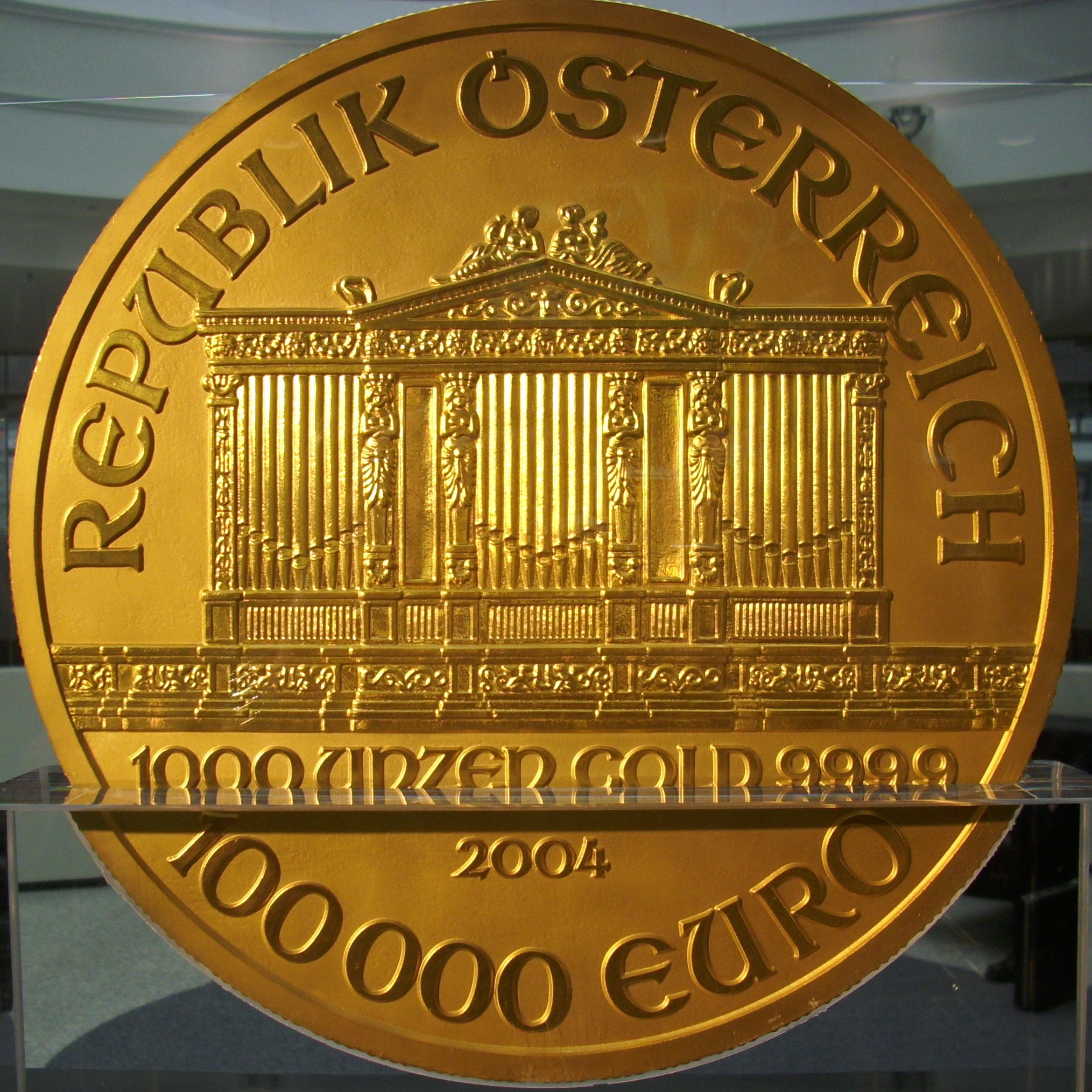
"Big Phil"

For the 15th anniversary of the Vienna Philharmonic bullion coin in 2004, the Austrian Mint created a 1,000-troy ounce version with nominal value 100,000 euros. The "Big Phil" coin consists of 31.103 kilograms (68.57 lb) of gold. Dimensions were increased by tenfold over the one ounce coin, yielding a diameter of 37 centimetres (15 in) and 2 centimetres (0.79 in) thickness (10 times thicker; 10 times wider; 1,000 times heavier than the standard 1-ounce coin). It was one of the largest coins with the highest denomination, until it was eclipsed, in 2007, by the Royal Canadian Mint's 100 kilograms (220 lb) version of the Canadian Gold Maple Leaf with a face value of 1,000,000 Canadian dollars. In keeping with the 15th anniversary theme, only fifteen 100,000-euro Philharmonics were produced. The coin was unveiled in front of the Wiener Riesenrad in Vienna. One of the coins is displayed in the foyer of the Munich headquarters of precious metals company Pro Aurum.

=== 20-ounce gold coin ===
For the 20th anniversary of the Vienna Philharmonic coin, the Austrian Mint created a new size of the coin. This coin has a face value of 2,000 euros and a fine weight of 20 troy ounces or 622 grams. The diameter is 74 millimetres (3 in) with a thickness of 8.3 millimetres (0.3 in). At the time of issue in October 2009, the material value was around 14,000 euros. Due to the limited minting, the coin was sold at a premium of approximately 10% above the gold price. The total circulation of these coins was 6,027 (providing 2,009 coins in each of the European, American and Japanese markets), which were sold in velvet-lined wooden cases with certificates.

== Mintage figures ==
=== Gold ===
Year	1/25 ozt	1/10 ozt	1/4 ozt	1/2 ozt	1 ozt
1989	—	—	272,000	—	351,000
1990	—	—	162,000	—	484,500
1991	—	82,500	146,000	—	233,500
1992	—	99,000	176,000	—	537,000
1993	—	99,500	126,000	—	234,000
1994	—	112,000	121,200	94,700	218,600
1995	—	151,100	156,000	57,400	645,500
1996	—	128,300	139,200	88,000	377,600
1997	—	115,300	100,700	68,200	408,300
1998	—	102,800	90,800	47,300	330,300
1999	—	145,000	81,600	44,200	230,700
2000	—	32,600	25,900	20,500	245,700
2001	—	26,400	25,800	26,800	54,700
2002	—	75,789	40,807	40,922	164,105
2003	—	59,654	34,019	26,848	179,881
2004	—	67,994	32,449	24,269	176,319
2005	—	62,071	32,817	21,049	158,564
2006	—	39,892	29,609	20,085	82,174
2007	—	76,325	34,631	25,091	108,675
2008	—	176,682	97,090	73,778	715,842
2009	—	437,706	171,992	92,249	903,047
2010	—	226,685	84,968	56,607	501,951
2011	—	272,227	102,026	73,488	586,686
2012	—	176,262	64,314	49,483	341,411
2013	—	193,115	77,219	69,573	579,223
2014	78,551	147,461	68,440	57,816	418,919
2015	88,157	263,439	112,228	101,500	647,100
2016	67,91	181,536	91,809	78,460	451,007
2017	40,186	131,815	65,086	52,281	355,436
2018	44,637	116,932	46,080	44,750	318,334
2019	44,023	100,697	56,199	40,890	164,312
2020	119,230	329,377	155,908	112,430	706,626

=== Platinum ===
Year	1/25 ozt	1 ozt
2016	—	35,257
2017	4,100	15,354
2018	2,814	13,753
2019	2,034	17,798
2020	4,913	40,891

=== Silver ===
Year	1 ozt
2008	7,773,000
2009	9,014,800
2010	11,358,200
2011	17,873,700
2012	8,769,200
2013	14,536,400
2014	4,643,508
2015	7,298,593
2016	3,448,390
2017	2,064,804
2018	2,101,592
2019	2,904,983
2020	7,193,117

== See also ==
- Bullion
- Bullion coin
- Euro gold and silver commemorative coins (Austria)
- Gold as an investment
- Inflation hedge
- Platinum as an investment
- Silver as an investment
