= Austrian Mint =

Mint in Vienna

Coordinates: 48°12′13″N 16°22′58″E

- Native name: Münze Österreich
- Company type: Aktiengesellschaft
- Founded: 1989; 36 years ago
- Key people: CEO - Gerhard Starsich
- Parent: Oesterreichische Nationalbank
- Website: www.muenzeoesterreich.at

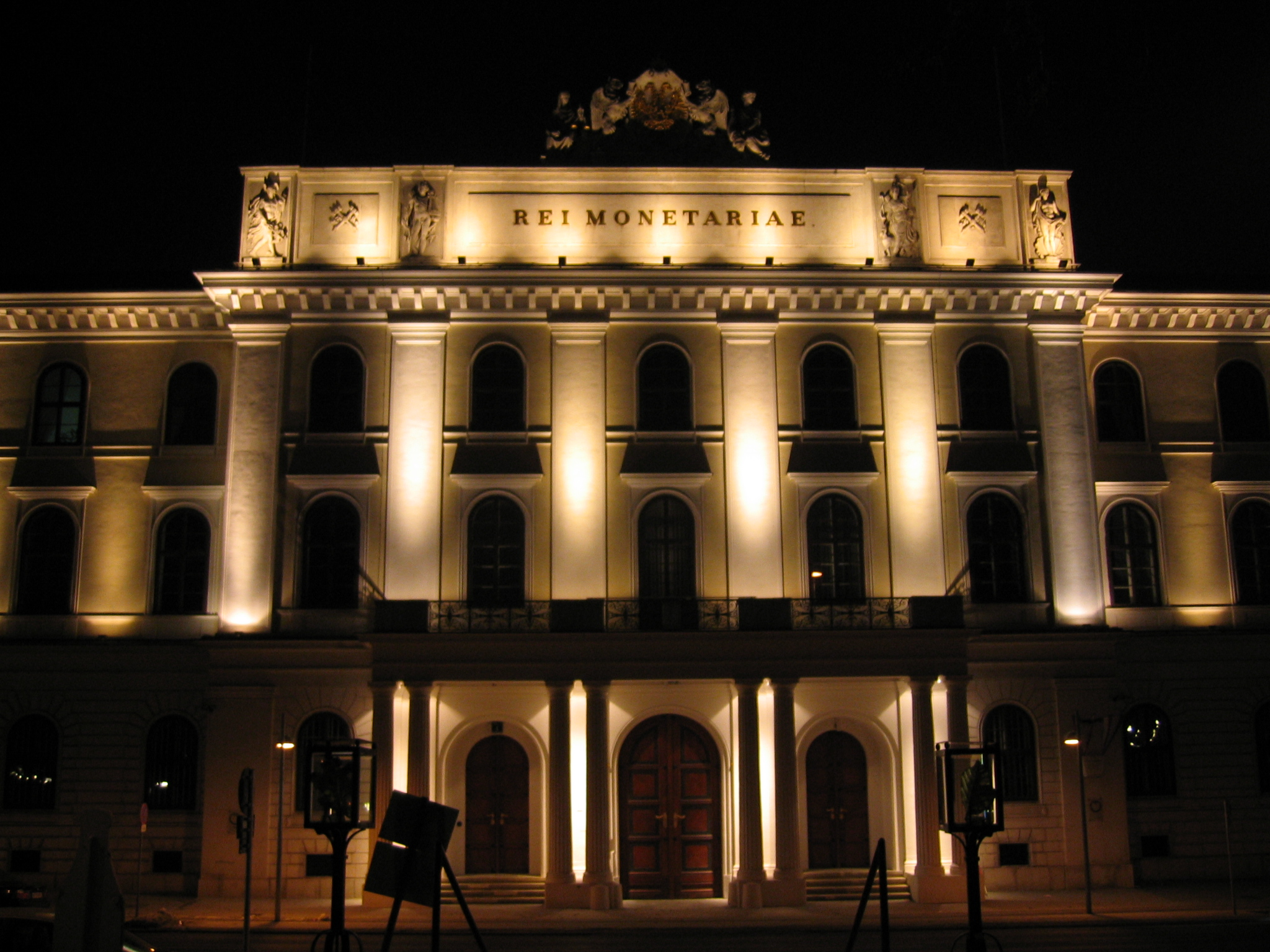
Headquarters of the Austrian Mint at Heumarkt in Landstrasse in Vienna

The Austrian Mint (German: Münze Österreich) is located in Vienna and is responsible for minting Austrian coins. Since 1989 it has been a public limited company (Aktiengesellschaft) and a subsidiary of Austria's central bank Oesterreichische Nationalbank, which also has its headquarters in Vienna.

The Austrian Mint carries out both the design and stamping of the coins it produces. Until 2002 it was only responsible for minting the coins of the Austrian schilling; since then it has been responsible for producing the Austrian euro coins. The mint also produces other coins, such as gold bullion coins, as well as commemorative issues: the Vienna Philharmonic coins and the Maria Theresa thaler are produced by the Austrian mint, for example. The mint also supplies circulation coins and blanks to many other countries across the world. In addition to gold coins, the Austrian mint also produces silver coins, platinum coins, as well as bullions in various sizes.

== History ==
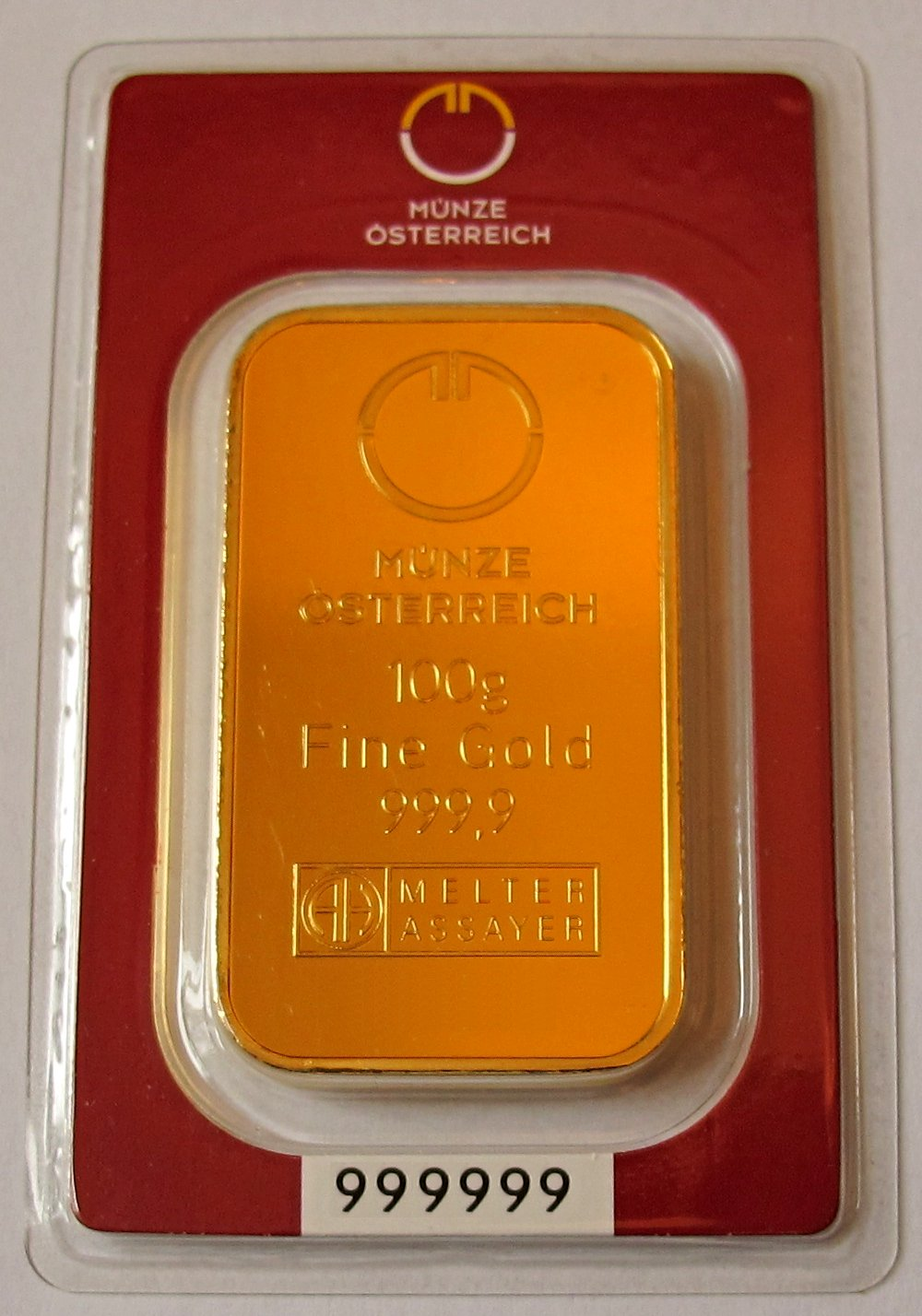
Gold Ingot from Münze Österreich

In 1194, Duke Leopold V of Austria was paid 15 tonnes of silver by Richard the Lionheart. On his way back from the crusades Richard had been captured and imprisoned by the Duke in retaliation for a previous insult; he paid the bounty to secure his release from prison. Leopold decided to strike coins from the silver, marking the beginning of the history of minting in Vienna (though the Vienna Mint was not actually mentioned in historical documents for another 200 years).

The mint was originally located near the Hoher Markt, then relocated to the Wollzeile. Subsequently, it was housed in Prince Eugene's winter palace in Himmelpfortgasse, before finally moving to its present home at Heumarkt, central Vienna, in the 19th century.

Though other mints were established across Austria in the past, the Vienna Principal Mint became the sole mint when the Republic of Austria was formed in 1919. The mint changed its name to Münze Österreich ("Austrian Mint") as it became a subsidiary of Oesterreichische Nationalbank in 1989.

== See also ==
- Austrian schilling
- Euro coins
- Euro gold and silver commemorative coins (Austria)
- Vienna Philharmonic (coin)
- Oesterreichische Nationalbank
