= Austrian euro coins =

Designs of Austrian currency

Austrian euro coins have a unique design for each denomination, with a common theme for each of the three series of coins. The minor coins feature Austrian flowers, the middle coins examples of architecture from Austria's capital, Vienna, and the two major coins famous Austrians. All designs are by the hand of Josef Kaiser and also include the 12 stars of the EU, Flag of Austria and the year of imprint.

== Austrian euro design ==
Prior to 2008, the old common side showing national borders was used, but from the 2008 coins use the new common side without borders. For images of the common side and a detailed description of the coins, see euro coins. Austria is the only country which uses the Latin alphabet and yet, repeats the denomination on the national side of the coins, thus not adhering to the rule.

From 2017 (5 cent coins) and 2018 (2 and 1 cent coins) onwards, the design of the national side has been slightly altered, decreasing the thickness and increasing the amount of hatching representing the red fields of the Austrian flag. As of 2022 the designs of the remaining coins has been altered, decreasing the size of stars, changing the size of numerals and modifying the font used to spell "EURO CENT" / "EURO".

Depiction of Austrian euro coinage | Obverse side
€ 0.01	€ 0.02	€ 0.05
An Alpine gentian as a symbol of Austria's part in developing EU environmental policy.	An Alpine edelweiss as a symbol of Austria's part in developing EU environmental policy.	An Alpine primrose as a symbol of Austria's part in developing EU environmental policy.
€ 0.10	€ 0.20	€ 0.50
St. Stephen's Cathedral, the epitome of Viennese Gothic architecture dating to 1160.	Belvedere Palace, an example of Baroque architecture, symbolizing national freedom and sovereignty.	Secession Building within a circle, symbolising the birth of Art Nouveau and a new age in the country.
€ 1.00	€ 2.00	€ 2 Coin Edge
Wolfgang Amadeus Mozart (with his signature), a famous Austrian composer, in reference to the idea of Austria as a "land of music".	Bertha von Suttner, a radical Austrian pacifist and Nobel Peace Prize winner, as a symbol of Austria's efforts to support peace.	

== Circulating mintage quantities ==
The following table shows the mintage quantity for all Austrian euro coins, per denomination, per year.

Face Value	€0,01	€0,02	€0,05	€0,10	€0,20	€0,50	€1,00	€2,00
2002	378 510 000	326 510 000	217 110 000	441 710 000	203 510 000	169 210 000	223 610 000	196 510 000
2003	10 955 100	118 655 100	108 655 100	**170 100**	51 055 100	9 255 100	**305 100**	4 855 100
2004	115 120 000	156 520 000	89 420 000	5 320 000	54 920 000	3 220 000	2 720 000	2 620 000
2005	174 820 000	163 320 000	66 220 000	5 320 000	4 220 000	3 220 000	2 720 000	—N/a
2006	48 420 000	39 920 000	5 720 000	40 120 000	8 320 000	3 320 000	7 820 000	2 420 000
2007	111 995 000	72 295 000	52 795 000	81 395 000	45 095 000	3 095 000	41 195 000	—N/a
2008	50 965 000	125 165 000	96 765 000	70 265 000	45 365 000	3 065 000	65 565 000	2 665 000
2009	158 991 000	120 491 000	5 891 000	15 991 000	49 891 000	14 791 000	40 391 000	—N/a
2010	168 565 000	104 265 000	63 765 000	42 865 000	4 265 000	30 065 000	11 265 000	17 065 000
2011	189 665 000	148 665 000	66 665 000	27 665 000	21 365 000	6 065 000	8 065 000	27 765 000
2012	169 360 000	78 160 000	35 360 000	25 060 000	10 860 000	**60 000**	**60 000**	21 200 000
2013	179 260 000	121 560 000	36 160 000	30 160 000	25 260 000	**60 000**	**60 000**	10 160 000
2014	185 560 000	116 160 000	48 060 000	27 660 000	10 560 000	**60 000**	**60 000**	20 160 000
2015	118 060 000	45 460 000	61 060 000	63 160 000	9 060 000	**60 000**	**60 000**	12 360 000
2016	**60 000**	**60 000**	**60 000**	12 360 000	30 060 000	5 060 000	5 260 000	—N/a
2017	37 760 000	57 260 000	35 260 000	39 560 000	30 060 000	15 060 000	8 060 000	17 760 000
2018	138 560 000	85 710 000	22 600 000	30 260 000	20 460 000	17 160 000	5 160 000	—N/a
2019	130 960 000	91 260 000	15 060 000	15 160 000	25 660 000	2 860 000	2 760 000	15 860 000
2020	85 560 000	57 360 000	5 660 000	12 160 000	19 860 000	14 960 000	4 060 000	12 760 000
2021	73 460 000	64 660 000	20 260 000	12 160 000	21 060 000	7 460 000	5 460 000	9 960 000
2022	38 060 000	58 460 000	16 760 000	15 760 000	25 360 000	8 460 000	7 060 000	9 110 000
2023	28 460 000	36 160 000	13 760 000	26 560 000	38 060 000	8 460 000	9 060 000	38 360 000
**Bold** - Small quantities minted for sets only.

== Austrian proof set ==
Each year the Austrian Mint issues a limited edition of its Euro coins in proof quality.

How the set looks (2005)

== €2 commemorative coins ==
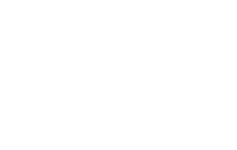
50th anniversary of the Treaty of Rome (2007)

Ten years of the Economic and Monetary Union (EMU) and the birth of the euro (2009)

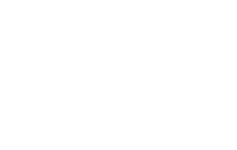
10th anniversary of the issuance of Euro coins and banknotes (2012)

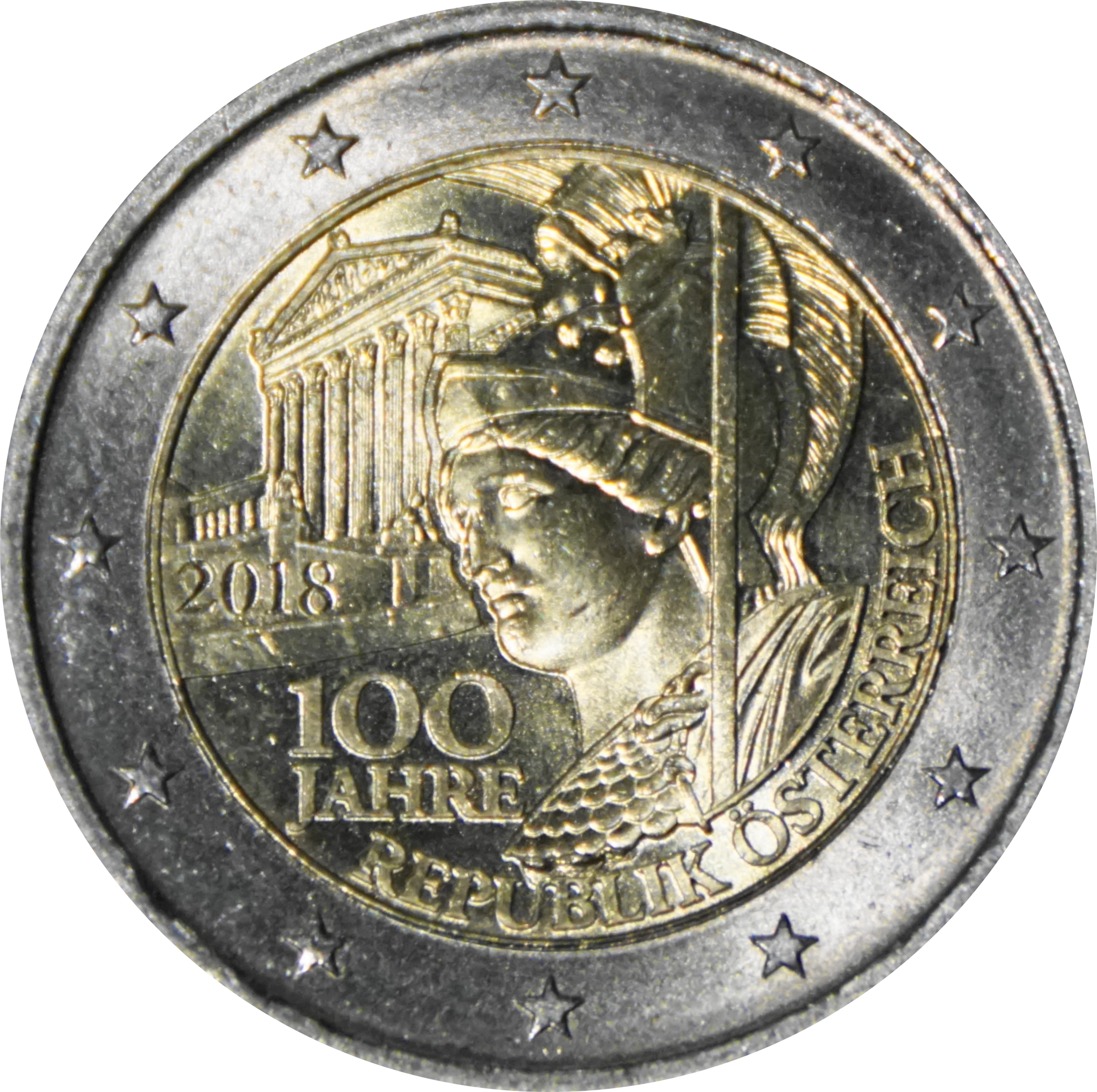
100 years since the foundation of the First Austrian Republic (2018)

== Other commemorative coins (collector's coins) ==
Austria has a large collection of euro commemorative coins, mainly in silver and gold, but they also use other materials (like niobium for example). Their face value range from 5 euro to 100 euro. This is mainly done as a legacy of old national practice of minting gold and silver coins. These coins are not really intended to be used as means of payment, so generally they do not circulate.

Gold, 50 euro, Wolfgang Amadeus Mozart (2006)

Silver and niobium, 25 euro, European Satellite Navigation (2006)

Silver, 20 euro, The Austrian Merchant Navy (2006)

== See also ==
- Adoption of the euro in Austria
