= Bargoens =

Form of Dutch slang

Bargoens (Dutch pronunciation: [bɑrˈɣuns]) is a Dutch minority language, a form of Dutch slang. More specifically, it is a cant language that arose in the 17th century, and was used by criminals, tramps and travelling salesmen as a secret code, like Spain's Germanía or French Argot. It originates from Rotwelsch and Yiddish. For example, the word bink, borrowed from Romani beng, drifted into "tough guy" from its meaning of the Devil. A false friend may be responsible for the rare meaning of "spouse".

However, the word Bargoens usually refers to the thieves' cant spoken between 1850 and 1950. The actual slang varied greatly from place to place; often Bargoens denotes the variety from the Holland region in the Netherlands. While many words from Bargoens have faded into obscurity, others have become part of standard Dutch (but are more often used in the "Hollandic" than in other Dutch dialects). Hufter (jerk), gappen (to steal) and poen (money) are examples of words now common in Dutch. As is the case for most thieves' languages, many of the words from Bargoens are either insults or concern money, crime or sex.

Bargoens has many Yiddish loanwords. Examples are sjacheren (to barter), mesjokke (crazy), ganneven (to steal), gabber (buddy, friend), grandig (great), hachelen (to eat).

The name of this cant is close to baragouin, which means "jargon" in French. It is supposed to have been derived either from the Breton words bara+gwin (bread+wine) or from Bourgondisch ('Burgundish', i.e. [the language] from Burgundy).

Many Woonwagenbewoners (indigenous Dutch Travellers and Roma) used to speak this language as well.

== Examples ==
apehaar	(bad) tobacco
appie kim	OK
bajes	prison (from Yiddish בית, lit. "home")
bekakt	snobbish, posh
bollebof	manager
bisnis	business life, more specifically in prostitution
eisjedies	adultery
gabber	friend (from Yiddish חבר)
gozer	young man (slang of Geuzen)
hufter	bastard
lef	courage (Old German (van Dale))
jatten	noun: hands; verb: steal (from Yiddish)
penoze	underworld, organized crime (from Yiddish פּרנסה)
opduvelen!	bugger off!
saffie	cigarette; in earlier days also cigar (from the Morocco leather used for cigar kokers)
smeris	policeman (from Yiddish שמירה, lit. "keeping, detention")
temeier	prostitute (from Yiddish טמאה, lit. "ritually impure")
kassiewijle	dead, defect (conjugation of box and Dutch word wijlen=the late)
toges/tokus	pump, anus (from Yiddish תּחת, compare English tuchus.)

Below is the table of nicknames given to pre-euro:

spie	cent
hondje, beisje	dubbeltje, 10 cent coin
heitje	Twenty-five cent coin (from Hebrew ה, the fifth letter in the abjad, thus five stuivers.)
piek, pegel	guilder
knaak	rijksdaalder
joet	ten guilders (from Hebrew י, the tenth letter in the abjad)
geeltje	twenty five guilders (lit. "little yellow one")
meier	hundred guilders (from Yiddish מאה)
(rooie) rug	thousand guilders (lit. "(red) back")

== See also ==
- Grypsera
