= Five-cent coin =

A five-cent coin or five-cent piece is a small-value coin minted for various decimal currencies using the cent as their hundredth subdivision. It is 1/20 of the base unit.

Examples include:

- Nickel (United States coin), worth 5 cents
- Nickel (Canadian coin), officially the "5 cent" piece
- Australian five-cent coin
- New Zealand five-cent coin (withdrawn in 2006 due to low monetary value)
- Hong Kong five-cent coin (withdrawn in 1989 due to low monetary value)
- Singapore five-cent coin
- Brunei five-cent coin
- five-cent coin of the decimal Dutch guilder (Netherlands), also called Stuiver (withdrawn in 2001 due to introduction of the euro)
  - 5 cents (World War II Dutch coin)
- 5 cent euro coin used in several European countries known as the eurozone
- five-cent coin of the South African rand
- Newfoundland five cents

== See also ==
- Category:Five-cent coins
