= One guilder coin (1982–2001) =

1 guilder
- Netherlands
- Value: 1.00 Dutch guilder
- Mass: 6.00 g
- Diameter: 25 mm
- Thickness: ? mm
- Edge: Plain, God be with us ("GOD ZIJ MET ONS")
- Composition: 100% Ni
- Years of minting: 1982-2001 (Utrecht)
- Mintage: ?
- Circulation: ?– 28 January 2002 Redeemed by national bank until 1 January 2007

Obverse
- Design: Queen Beatrix
- Designer: Bruno Ninaber van Eyben

Reverse
- Design: Face value, year, privy mark (left), mint mark (right)
- Designer: Bruno Ninaber van Eyben

The Dutch 1 guilder coin featuring Queen Beatrix on its obverse was a unit of currency of the Dutch guilder minted between 1982 and 2001.

It remained in use until the adoption of the euro in 2002. Its nominal value was ƒ 1,- (€0.45).
