= Ten cent coin (Netherlands 1926–1941) =

Dutch coin

10 cents
- Netherlands
- Value: 0.10 Dutch gulden
- Diameter: 15 mm
- Edge: Reeded
- Orientation: Coin
- Composition: 72% Ag
- Years of minting: 1926~1945 (Utrecht)
- Mintage: 155,400,000
- Circulation: ?–1948

Obverse
- Design: Face value, year, mint mark, privy mark. Two twigs.

Reverse
- Design: Country-designation. Queen Wilhelmina
- Designer: J. C. Wienecke

== Mintage numbers ==
The following numbers of coins were struck:

| Year | Mintage | Mint | Mint marks | Remarks |
|---|---|---|---|---|
| 1926 | 2,700,000 | Utrecht | Utrecht mint, mintmaster | – |
| 1927 | 2,300,000 | Utrecht | Utrecht mint, mintmaster | – |
| 1928 | 10,000,000 | Utrecht | Utrecht mint, mintmaster | – |
| 1930 | 5,000,000 | Utrecht | Utrecht mint, mintmaster | – |
| 1934 | 2,000,000 | Utrecht | Utrecht mint, privy mark | Privy mark is slightly smaller than other years, and the grapes have one extra branch. |
| 1935 | 8,000,000 | Utrecht | Utrecht mint, mintmaster | – |
| 1936 | 16,000,000 | Utrecht | Utrecht mint, mintmaster | – |
| 1937 | 18,600,000 | Utrecht | Utrecht mint, mintmaster | – |
| 1938 | 21,400,000 | Utrecht | Utrecht mint, mintmaster | – |
| 1939 | 20,000,000 | Utrecht | Utrecht mint, mintmaster | – |
| 1941 | 43,000,000 | Utrecht | Utrecht mint, mintmaster | During 1941 an unusually large number of coins were struck in order to prevent precious war metals from falling into the hands of the Germans. |
| Total: | 149,000,000 | | | |

| Preceded by Wilhelmina (3rd portrait); 1906~1922 | Wilhelmina (4th portrait) 1926–1945 | Succeeded by World War II; 1941–1943 (In Netherlands proper only, not in colonies) |
