= Five guilder coin (Netherlands) =

5 guilder
- The Netherlands
- Value: 5.00 Dutch guilder
- Mass: 9.25 g
- Diameter: 23.5 mm
- Thickness: 2.4 mm
- Edge: Reeded, "GOD ZIJ MET ONS" (God be with us)
- Orientation: coin
- Composition: bronze-plated nickel
- Years of minting: 1988–2001
- Mintage: 216,675,000 (Utrecht)
- Circulation: 1 May 1988– 28 January 2002; Redeemed by national bank until 1 January 2007
- Catalog number: KM # 210

Obverse
- Design: Queen Beatrix
- Designer: Bruno Ninaber van Eyben

Reverse
- Design: Face value, year, privy mark (left), mint mark (right)
- Designer: Bruno Ninaber van Eyben

The Dutch Five guilder coin was the highest-denomination coin in the Netherlands from its introduction in 1988 until the adoption of the euro in 2002. Its nominal value was ƒ 5,- (€ 2.27).

All of its mintings featured the portrait of Queen Beatrix on the obverse.

== History ==
After a first few isolated issues in low numbers under the kings William I and William II in the early 19th century, a gold five guilder coin was issued under Queen Wilhelmina in 1912. One million pieces were struck that year but none were struck in the following years of her reign. Many of these ended up in necklaces and bracelets, and its popularity as a jewel meant that imitations were made without the coin.

The introduction of a 5 guilder coin was first discussed and eventually approved in 1981. It would replace the 5 guilder note in circulation at the time. However, at the time De Nederlandsche Bank (Central Bank of the Netherlands) had a very large supply of these banknotes in stock. Thus, in order to prevent wasting them, it was decided to postpone the introduction of the coin for several years. The new coin had to fit in the current series. The ministry of finance reported it was to become "gold-coloured" and "smaller than the guilder coin and thicker than the rijksdaalder (2½ guilder coin)". It was introduced on 1 May 1988.

In 2000 a commemorative 5 guilder coin was struck in honour of the UEFA Euro 2000 in the Netherlands and Belgium. The 5 guilder coin was withdrawn from circulation on 28 January 2002 following the introduction of the euro. It remained tender to be exchanged for currency of the euro until 1 January 2007.

== Mintage ==
The following number of coins have been struck.

Year	Mintage	Mint	Mint marks	Remarks
1988	73,500,000	Utrecht	Utrecht mint, mintmaster	-
1989	69,000,000	Utrecht	Utrecht mint, mintmaster	-
1990	47,200,000	Utrecht	Utrecht mint, mintmaster	-
1991	17,000,000	Utrecht	Utrecht mint, mintmaster	-
1992	400,000	Utrecht	Utrecht mint, mintmaster	-
1993	5,400,000	Utrecht	Utrecht mint, mintmaster	-
1994	400,000	Utrecht	Utrecht mint, mintmaster	-
1995	400,000	Utrecht	Utrecht mint, mintmaster	-
1996	150,000	Utrecht	Utrecht mint, mintmaster	-
1997	170,000	Utrecht	Utrecht mint, mintmaster	-
1998	100,000	Utrecht	Utrecht mint, mintmaster	-
1999	120,000	Utrecht	Utrecht mint, mintmaster	-
2000	200,000	Utrecht	Utrecht mint, mintmaster	-
2000 EC	2,520,000	Utrecht	Utrecht mint, mintmaster	Commemorative coin. Mintage number includes 35,000 FDC and 20,000 Proof-quality coins.
2001	115,000	Utrecht	Utrecht mint, mintmaster	-
Total:	216,675,000			-

As of October 2002, 153,000,000 (70.61%) of 5 Guilder coins had been returned to the national bank.

== Commemorative coin of the UEFA European Championship ==
A special coin of 5 guilder was struck in honour of the UEFA Euro 2000 football championship held in the Netherlands and Belgium in 2000. It would be the only commemorative coin valued 5 guilder.

5 guilder UEFA European Championship 2000	
The football game is the central theme of the obverse. A football covers the entire surface of the coin, making the coin look like a football itself	The reverse depicts a new portrait of Queen Beatrix. It has a more casual character than her regular coin portrait. A football is placed in the background.
Designers: Michael Readecker and Geerten Verheus
Issue: 4 May 2000	

The first coins were struck in Utrecht on 3 May 2000. The coin was distributed from 4 May onward through four large supermarket branches (Basismarkt, Edah, Konmar and Super de Boer). Belgium minted a commemorative 50-Franc coin (in both French and Dutch) in honour of the European Championship.

The mintage numbers were as follows:

Quality	Mintage	Price
Circulation	2,500,000	nominal
Fleur de coin (FDC)	35,000	ƒ 19.95 (€ 9.05)
Proof	20,000	ƒ 29.95 (€ 13.59)

The Dutch national mint also minted a number of FDC and Proof coins, intended for sale. Sale prices at the time are listed above. Also a set including both the Dutch and Belgian European Championship-coins in FDC-quality was sold for ƒ 59.95 (€ 27.20).

== Sources ==
Kerstpers, Magazine of the Dutch national mint, November 2000.
