= One guilder coin (Netherlands) =

The One guilder coin was a coin struck in the Kingdom of the Netherlands between 1818 and 2001. It remained in circulation until 2002 when the guilder currency was replaced by the euro. No guilder coins were minted in the German occupation of the Netherlands in World War II.

All of them featured the reigning monarch on the obverse, and until Queen Beatrix in 1982, the national Coat of Arms on the reverse. At the time of its demonetisation, the guilder was the third-highest denomination coin in the Netherlands.

== History ==
=== Pre-World War II ===
The first guilder coin was struck from 1818 to 1837 as a 0.893 silver coin. It measured 30mm in diameter and weighed 10.766g. The coins of the first year of mintage have a wider diameter of 30.5mm. The obverse featured a portrait of King William I of the Netherlands facing right, with the inscription WILLEM KONING on his left and DER NED.(erlanden) G.(root) H.(ertog) V.(an) L.(uxemburg) on the right (meaning 'William King of the Netherlands, Grand Duke of Luxembourg'. The reverse featured the Dutch coat of arms with '1' and 'G' either side of the coat of arms and '100C' below. The date was split at the top and the inscription read MUNT VAN HET KONINGRYK DER NEDERLANDEN (meaning 'Coin of the Kingdom of the Netherlands').

Obverse of the 0.945 silver guilder coin featuring King William II of the Netherlands, minted from 1840 to 1849

From 1840 to 1849, the obverse portrait was that of King William II of the Netherlands facing left, and the silver was upgraded to 0.945. The weight decreased to 10g and the diameter to 28mm. The edge was inscribed GOD * ZY * MET ONS (God be with us).

The third guilder coin featured King William III of the Netherlands facing right. All other aspects were identical to the coin under the reign of William II.

Reverse of the 0.720 silver guilder coin featuring Queen Wilhelmina of the Netherlands. This 1929 specimen features a seahorse privy mark

From 1892 to 1897 a portrait of the young new Queen Wilhelmina of the Netherlands featured on the obverse, with the inscription WILHELMINA KONINGIN DER NEDERLANDEN (Wilhelmina Queen of the Netherlands) as the duchy of Luxembourg had been passed to Adolphe I. Otherwise, the coin retained the same design specifications. From 1898 to 1909 a different portrait featured, with the sculptor's name P. PANDER, underneath. A third portrait featured from 1910 to 1917.

The coins bearing the fourth portrait of Wilhelmina, from 1922 to 1945, were downgraded to 0.720 silver, which lowered their weight to 9.9g. Three different privy marks were issued: a seahorse from 1922 to 1931, grapes from 1938 to 1940 and an acorn from 1941 to 1945. During the Nazi German occupation of the Netherlands, no guilder coins were issued of the zinc coins circulated by the Nazis, but Dutch guilder coins were struck in the United States. In 1943 they were struck at the Denver Mint in Colorado and in 1944 at the Philadelphia Mint in Pennsylvania and the San Francisco Mint in California. In 1945, 25,375,000 were issued in Philadelphia.

=== Post-World War II ===
In 1954 production of the guilder coin resumed. The diameter was reduced to 25mm and the weight to 6.5g, yet the composition remained 0.720 silver. The reverse was simplified to the coat of arms with the date and denomination split on each side, with the name NEDERLAND on the bottom. A portrait of Queen Juliana of the Netherlands featured on the obverse. In 1967 a version of the coin in nickel was tested, which became the sole guilder from 1968 to 1980. The weight was brought down to 6g. Different privy marks were used: a fish in 1967 to 1969 and a cock from 1969 to 1980. The final issue in 1980 had the highest mintage, 118,300,000, with a privy mark of a cock and a star.

In 1980, 30.5 million commemorative guilder coins were issued, for the investiture of Queen Beatrix of the Netherlands. She featured on the obverse in front of her mother Juliana, with the date 30 April 1980 above. The denomination on the reverse was written in full at the bottom next to the country name.

The final circulation issue of the guilder was from 1982 to 2001, in the same specifications as the previous coin. Queen Beatrix featured on the obverse, facing down, and the reverse removed the coat of arms. Different privy marks were used: from 1982 to 1988 an anvil, from 1989 to 1999 a bow, in 2000 a bow and a star, and in 2001 grapes.

In 2001, the final year of the guilder, a commemorative was issued in the same specifications with 16,045,000 in circulation and 32,000 in proof. The obverse had a different portrait of Queen Beatrix with her title spiralling around her, and the reverse, designed by Tim van Melis, featured a very simplified version of the lion on the Dutch coat of arms.

== See also ==
- Dutch guilder
