= Westerlichttoren =

Westerlichttoren West Schouwen
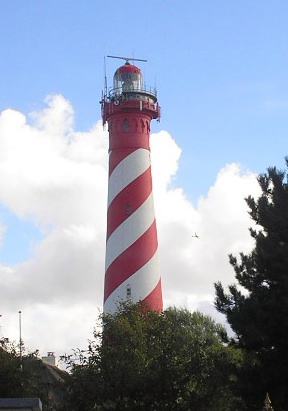
- Westerlichttoren Lighthouse
- Location: Haamstede, Netherlands
- Coordinates: 51°42′32.3″N 3°41′29.6″E

Tower
- Constructed: 1840
- Construction: brick tower
- Automated: yes
- Height: 50 metres (160 ft)
- Shape: cylindrical tower with balcony and lantern
- Markings: white and red spiral tower, red lantern and dome
- Heritage: Rijksmonument

Light
- Focal height: 58 metres (190 ft)
- Lens: second order Fresnel lens
- Intensity: 2000 W
- Range: 30 nautical miles (56 km)
- Characteristic: Gp Fl.(2+1)
- Netherlands no.: NL-0324

The Westerlichttoren or West Schouwen is a lighthouse in Haamstede, Netherlands. Designed by L. Valk, it was built in 1837. At 47 m (154 ft) above ground and a light stand at 58 m (190 ft) above sea level it is one of the tallest lighthouses in the Netherlands.

The lighthouse is built in brick and iron, the walls are 2.4 m thick at the bottom, tapering upward. It is painted in a red-and-white spiral. A stair of 226 steps, in stone and partially in iron, leads to the top. The lighthouse is unattended.

== Light ==
The lighthouse is switched on and off automatically by a light sensor. A sailor can recognise the light by its characteristic: group flash 2+1. The current lenses were installed in 1953. Originally the light was an incandescent light bulb of 4200 W, which has been replaced by a 2000 W gas-discharge lamp.

== Notability ==
This lighthouse was well known by the public as it was used for the former 250 Dutch guilder note designed by Ootje Oxenaar.

== See also ==
- List of lighthouses in the Netherlands
