= Five cent coin (Netherlands) =

The Five cent coin (commonly called Stuiver) was a coin struck in the Kingdom of the Netherlands between 1818 and 2001. Twenty stuivers equalled a Dutch Guilder.

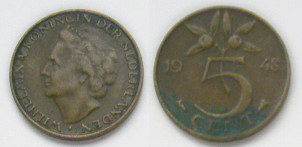
5 Cent, 1948.

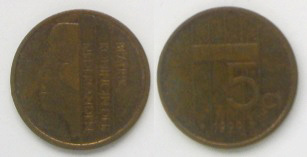
5 Cent, 1999.

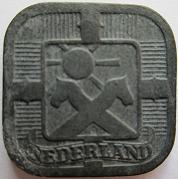
Obverse 5 cent, 1943.

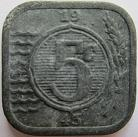
Reverse 5 cent, 1943.

== Dimensions and weight ==
	5 cent 1818–1828	5 cent 1848-1887	5 cent 1907–1909	5 cent 1913–1940	5 cent 1941–1943	5 cent 1948–2001
Mass	0.85 gram	0.69 gram	4.5 gram	4.5 gram	2.6 gram	3.5 gram
Diameter	15 mm	12.5 mm	18 mm	21.3 mm (Square rounded corners)	18 mm (Square rounded corners)	21 mm
Thickness	? mm	0.76 mm	1.8 mm	1.5 mm	? mm	1.45 mm (1948); 1.44 mm (1950-1980); 1.45 mm (1982-2001)
Metal	Silver .569	Silver .640	Nickel	Copper/Nickel	Zinc	Bronze

== Versions ==
Monarch	Mint	Material	Obverse	Reverse	Edge	Minting years
William I	Utrecht and Brussels	Silver	Crowned W between the mint year	Crowned Dutch coat of arms between value	Smooth with no edge lettering	1818(U), 1819(U), 1822(U), 1825(B), 1826(B), 1827(U and B), 1828(B)
William II	Utrecht	Silver	Kings bust to the left	Value and mint year between two bonded oak branches	Reeded with no edge lettering	1848
William III	Utrecht	Silver	Kings bust to the right	Value and mint year between two bonded oak branches	Reeded with no edge lettering	1850, 1853, 1855, 1859, 1862, 1863, 1868, 1869, 1876, 1879, 1887
Wilhelmina	Utrecht	Copper/Nickel	A crown between two oak branches	Value in a wreath of two bonded orange branches	Smooth with no edge lettering	1907–1909
Wilhelmina	Utrecht	Copper/Nickel	Fruit bearing orange branches within a double edge	Value within a pearl edge	Smooth with no edge lettering	1913, 1914, 1923, 1929, 1932–1934, 1936, 1938–1940, 1943
German occupation coin	Utrecht	Zinc	Two Saxon horse heads under a sun	Value within a ring with a cereal ear to the right and nine waves to the left	Smooth with no edge lettering	1941–1943
Wilhelmina	Utrecht	Bronze	Queens head to the left	Value with a fruit bearing orange branch	Smooth with no edge lettering	1948
Juliana	Utrecht	Bronze	Queens head to the right	Value with a fruit bearing orange branch	Smooth with no edge lettering	1950–1958, 1960–1967, 1969–1980
Beatrix	Utrecht	Bronze	Half Queens head to the left	Value with interrupted rectangular planes	Smooth with no edge lettering	1982–2001
Discontinued due to introduction of the euro.
