= God zij met ons =

Phrase on Dutch coins

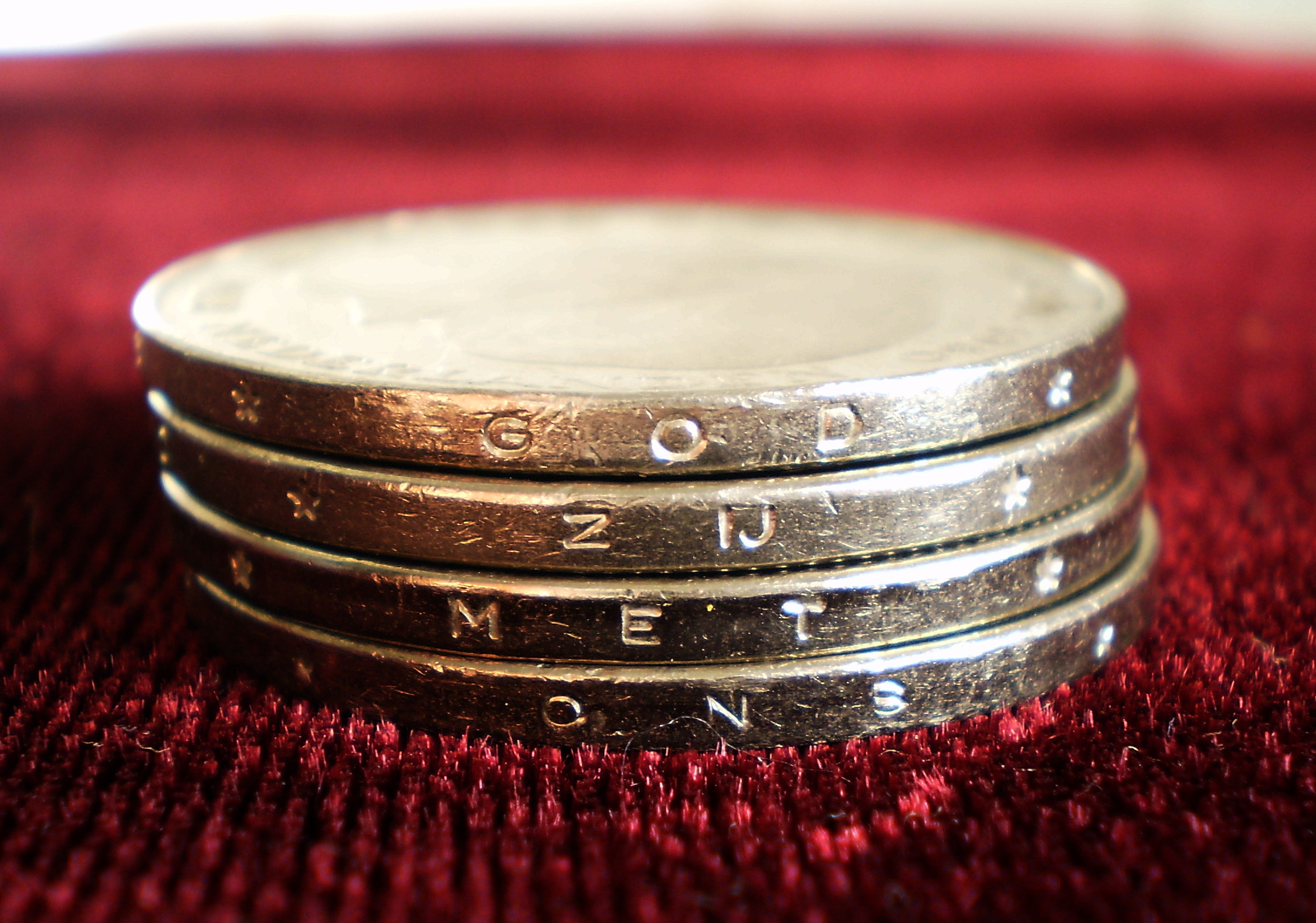
"God zij met ons" on rijksdaalders

"God zij met ons"

God zij met ons (English: God be with us) is a proverb phrase written on Dutch coins. This caption was formerly written on the edge of the guilder, rijksdaalder (two and a half guilder), five guilders, ten guilders and twenty-five guilders and today on 2-euro Dutch coins.

This shortened text expands into its Latin origin "Si Deus nobiscum quis contra nos" (If God is with us, who shall be against us?). This biblical motto was used in the Eighty Years' War and taken over by the Dutch Republic for use on its coins.

== See also ==
- In God We Trust
- So help me God
- Dutch royal family
- Religion in the Netherlands
- Gott mit uns
- Deo vindice
