= Dubbeltje =

Dutch coin

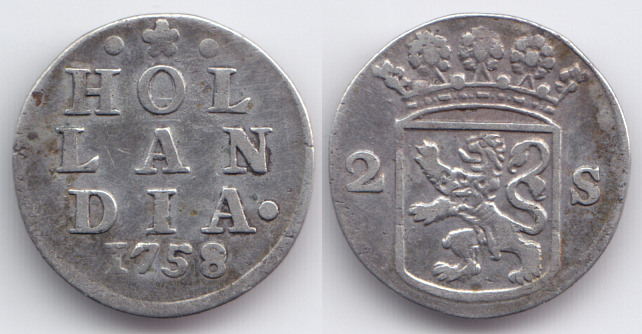
Double Stuiver, 1758, Holland

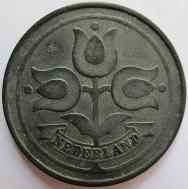
Obverse 10 cent, 1942.

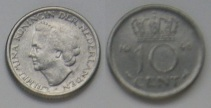
10-Cent, 1948

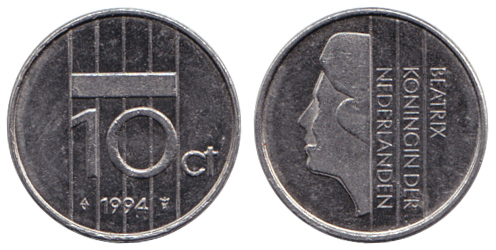
10-Cent, 1993

A dubbeltje (Dutch pronunciation: [ˈdʏbəltɕə]) is a small former Dutch coin, originally made of silver, with a value of a tenth of a Dutch guilder. The current 10-euro-cent coin in circulation today in the Netherlands is also sometimes called a dubbeltje.

The name "dubbeltje" is the diminutive form of the Dutch word "dubbel" (Dutch for "double") because it was worth two stuivers. When the decimal system came to the Netherlands (about 1800) the 10-cent coin was named a "dubbeltje". In Dutch slang, a dubbeltje was named a beisje, from Dutch-Yiddish beis, the value of two stuivers. Automatic translation from Dutch to English often translates "dubbeltje" as "dime".

The central opening in a CD is exactly the size of a dubbeltje (15 mm). Joop Sinjou, head of Philips audio products development, said that "De snelste beslissing in de ontwikkelingsfase was over de diameter van het gat in de CD. Ik legde een dubbeltje op tafel en dat werd de maat." ("The fastest decision in the development phase was about the diameter of the hole in the CD. I put a dubbeltje on the table and that was the size.") The same form factor with the dubbeltje-sized center was carried over on newer disc formats such as DVD and Blu-ray.

There are Dutch sayings about the dubbeltje:

- Dat was een dubbeltje op zijn kant (That was a dubbeltje on its edge): A narrow escape.
- Voor een dubbeltje op de eerste rij/rang (willen) zitten (To (want to) sit on the first row/rank for a dubbeltje): He gets (or wants to get) more for his money than he would expect from the price paid.
- Wie voor een dubbeltje geboren is, wordt nooit een kwartje (He who is born for a dubbeltje will never become a kwartje): If you're born poor, you'll never become rich.
- Zo plat als een dubbeltje (As thin as a dubbeltje): Really thin/flat.

== Dimensions and weight ==
	10-cent 1818–1828	10-cent 1848–1945	10-cent 1941–1943	10-cent 1948–2001
Mass	1.69 grams	1.4 grams	3.3 grams	1.5 grams
Diameter	18 mm	15 mm (1848–1890); 15.2 mm (1892–1897); 15 mm (1898–1945)	22 mm	15 mm
Thickness	? mm	0.86 mm (1848–1849); 0.96 mm (1849–1890); 0.81 mm (1892–1897); 1 mm (1926–1945)	1.5 mm	1.21 mm (1948); 1.21 mm (1950–1980); 1.26 mm (1982–2001)
Metal	Silver .569	Silver .640	Zinc	Nickel

== Versions ==
Monarch	Mint	Material	Obverse	Reverse	Edge	Minting years
William I	Utrecht and Brussels	Silver	Crowned W between the mint year	Crowned Dutch coat of arms between value	Smooth with no edge lettering	1818(U), 1819(U), 1822(U), 1823(B), 1825-1828(U and B)
William II	Utrecht	Silver	King's bust to the left	Value and mint year between two bonded oak branches	Reeded with no edge lettering	1848, 1849
William III	Utrecht	Silver	King's bust to the right	Value and mint year between two bonded oak branches	Reeded with no edge lettering	1849, 1850, 1853, 1855, 1856, 1859, 1862, 1863, 1868, 1869, 1871, 1973, 1874, 1876–1882, 1884, 1885, 1887, 1889, 1890
Wilhelmina	Utrecht	Silver	Queen's bust to the left with loose hair	Value and mint year between two bonded oak branches	Reeded with no edge lettering	1892
Wilhelmina	Utrecht	Silver	Queen's bust to the left with loose hair (broader)	Value and mint year between two bonded oak branches	Reeded with no edge lettering	1893–1897
Wilhelmina	Utrecht	Silver	Queen's head with diadem to the left	Value and mint year between two bonded oak branches	Reeded with no edge lettering	1898, 1901
Wilhelmina	Utrecht	Silver	Queens' head with diadem to the left (broader)	Value and mint year between two bonded oak branches	Reeded with no edge lettering	1903
Wilhelmina	Utrecht	Silver	Queen's head with diadem to the left (smaller)	Value and mint year between two bonded oak branches	Reeded with no edge lettering	1904–1906
Wilhelmina	Utrecht	Silver	Queen's bust with stoat cloak to the left	Value and mint year between two bonded oak branches	Reeded with no edge lettering	1910–1919, 1921, 1925
Wilhelmina	Utrecht, Philadelphia, San Francisco and Denver	Silver	Queen's head to the left	Value and mint year between two bonded oak branches	Reeded with no edge lettering	1926-1928(U), 1930(U), 1934-1939(U), 1941(U and P), 1942(P), 1943(P), 1944(P, S and D), 1945(P)
German occupation coin	Utrecht	Zinc	Three stylized tulips	Value and mint year between two twigs	Reeded with no edge lettering	1941–1943
Wilhelmina	Utrecht	Nickel	Queen's head to the left	Value and mint year under a crown	Reeded with no edge lettering	1948
Juliana	Utrecht	Nickel	Queen's head to the right	Value and mint year under a crown	Reeded with no edge lettering	1950, 1951, 1954–1980
Beatrix	Utrecht	Nickel	Half Queen's head to the left	Value with rectangular planes	Reeded with no edge lettering	1982–2001
Discontinued due to introduction of the euro.
