= Dutch guilder =

Currency of the Netherlands from 1434 to 2002

Nederlandse gulden (Dutch) fl.

ISO 4217
- Code: NLG

Units of account
- Base unit: guilder
- Plural: guilders
- Symbol: ƒ
- Subunit
- 1/100: cent
- Plural
- cent: cents

Denominations
- Banknotes
- Freq. used: ƒ10, ƒ25, ƒ50, ƒ100, ƒ250
- Rarely used: ƒ5 (withdrawn in 1995), ƒ1000
- Coins
- Freq. used: 5c, 10c, 25c, ƒ1, ƒ2 1/2, ƒ5
- Rarely used: 1c (withdrawn 1 March 1983), 1/2c, 2 1/2c (withdrawn 1948), 50c (withdrawn 1930)

Demographics
- User(s): None, previously: Netherlands (until 2002); Suriname (until 1962); Netherlands Antilles (until 1940); Luxembourg (until 1839); Belgium (until 1832)

Issuance
- Central bank: De Nederlandsche Bank
- Website: www.dnb.nl
- Printer: Joh. Enschedé
- Website: www.joh-enschede.nl
- Mint: Royal Dutch Mint
- Website: www.knm.nl

Valuation
- Inflation: 2.6% (December 2000)
- Source: worldpress.org, 2000 est.

EU Exchange Rate Mechanism (ERM)
- Since: 13 March 1979
- Fixed rate since: 31 December 1998
- Replaced by euro, non cash: 1 January 1999
- Replaced by euro, cash: 1 March 2002
- 1 € =: ƒ2.20371
- This infobox shows the latest status before this currency was rendered obsolete.

The guilder (Dutch: gulden, pronounced [ˈɣʏldə(n)]) or florin was the currency of the Netherlands from 1434 until 2002, when it was replaced by the euro.

The Dutch name gulden was a Middle Dutch adjective meaning 'golden', and reflects the fact that, when first introduced in 1434, its value was about equal to (i.e., it was on par with) the Italian gold florin. The Dutch guilder was a de facto reserve currency in Europe in the 17th and 18th centuries.

Between 1999 and 2002, the guilder was officially a "national subunit" of the euro. However, physical payments could only be made in guilders, as no euro coins or banknotes were available. The exact exchange rate, still relevant for old contracts and for exchange of the old currency for euros at the central bank, is exactly 2.20371 Dutch guilders for 1 euro. Inverted, this gives approximately 0.453780 euros for 1 guilder.

Derived from the Dutch guilder were the Netherlands Antillean guilder (Used by Curaçao and Sint Maarten until 2025, replaced by the Caribbean guilder) and the Surinamese guilder (replaced in 2004 by the Surinamese dollar).

== History ==
The gulden emerged as the official currency of the Burgundian Netherlands after the 1434 monetary reform done under Philip the Good. This table summarizes the gulden's value in terms of silver until the gold standard was introduced in 1875.

Value of gulden, grams
Year	g silver
1434–1466	32.60
1500–1560	19.07
1618	10.16
1659–1800	9.67
(Gulden banco)	10.15
1840	9.45
1875	0.6048 g gold

Prior to 1434 the Dutch issued currency conforming to the Carolingian monetary system, with a pound divided into 20 shillings and a shilling divided into 12 pennies. Dutch versions of the penny first came out in the 9th century, followed by local versions of the one-shilling gros tournois in the 13th century. The most notable version of the latter, the Flemish grote, subsequently depreciated faster than its counterparts in France, from its initial fine silver content of 4.044 g, to around 2.5 g by 1350, and to just 0.815 g before the reforms of 1434.

=== 1434–1466: Burgundian Netherlands ===
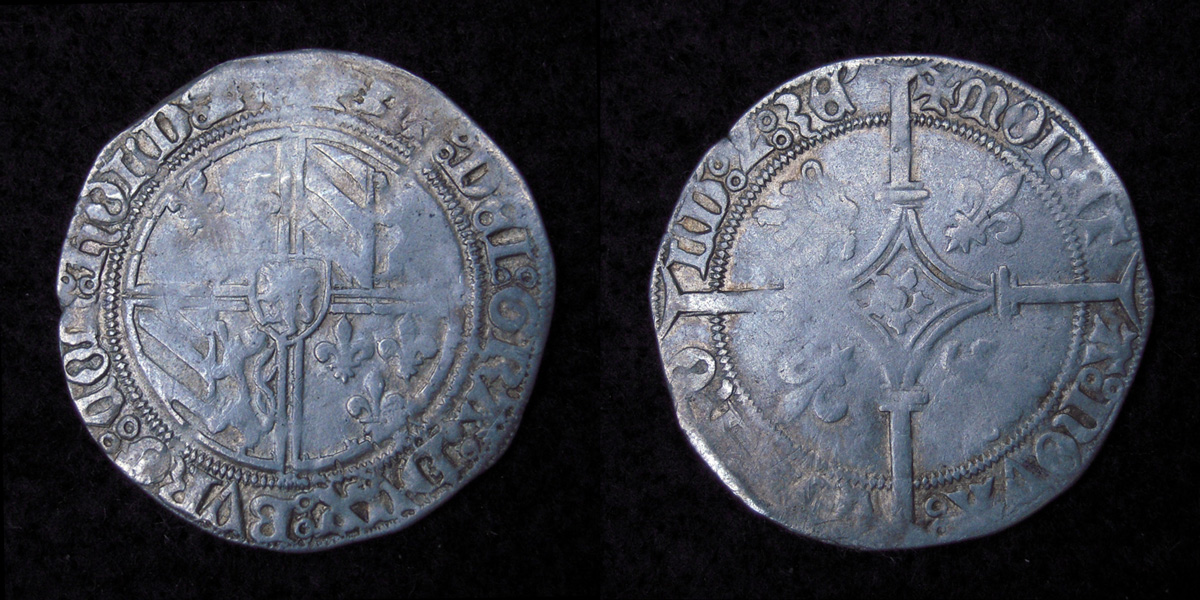
Vierlander stuiver of Philip the Good

Philip the Good devised a monetary system in 1434 relating the new Dutch currency to that of its neighbors: the French livre parisis of 38.25 g silver, and the English pound sterling of 215.8 g. The following units were defined:

- The stuiver of 1.63 g fine silver, equal to 2 Flemish grote or 3 Brabant grote, and approximately equal to the French sol (shilling) of 1.9125 g;
- The gulden, equal to 20 stuiver or 32.6 g fine silver, and approximately equal to the French livre parisis. As the French gold livre was about par with the gold florin of 3.5 g, this new denomination was therefore known as the gouden florijn, or gulden, or florin.
- The shilling Flemish (Schelling Vlaams), equal to 12 Flemish grote or 6 stuivers, and approximately equal to the English shilling of 12 pence sterling.
- And finally, the pound Flemish (pond Vlaams), equal to 240 Flemish grote or 6 gulden, and at 195.6 g fine silver was approximately equal to the English pound sterling.

The stuiver weighed 3.4 g of 23/48 silver fineness and was divided into 8 duiten or 16 penningen. As each stuiver was worth approximately 2 English pence, Dutch silver denominations of 1 duit and 1/4, 1/2, 1 and 2 stuivers neatly matched with English denominations of 1/4, 1/2, 1, 2 and 4 pence sterling (the latter two sterling coins were rarely minted).

French écus, English nobles and Dutch florins comprised the gold currency of the Low Countries and had a variable rate against the stuiver. A denomination worth 1 gulden did not exist until the 1464 issue of the Sint Andries florin containing 2.735 g of fine gold, but this was a mere two years before the resumption of debasements in the stuiver.

=== 1500–1560: Spanish Netherlands ===
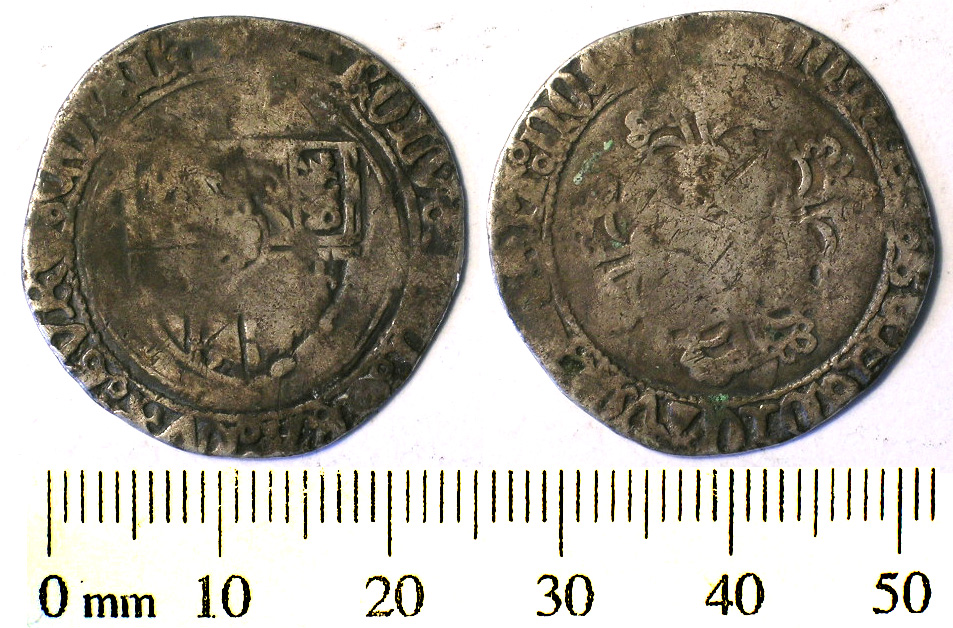
This Burgundian double patard (or 2-stuiver) found in England was current there for four English pence from 1469 to 1475.

The stuiver modestly depreciated between 1466 and 1475 before incurring more significant debasements up to the end of the 15th century. From 1469 to 1475 an agreement with England made the English groat (4-pence; 2.88 g fine silver) mutually exchangeable with the Burgundian double patard (or 2-stuiver) minted under Charles the Bold.

Follow-up attempts to issue 1-gulden coins resulted in the minting of the gold Karolusgulden of 1.77 g fine gold in 1520, and the silver Karolusgulden of 19.07 grams fine silver in 1541. The bullion content of French and English currencies eventually approached this value, with the French livre parisis becoming 20.4 g fine silver in 1549, and 1/6th of a pound sterling (3 shillings and 4 pence) becoming 19.2 g fine silver in 1551.

=== 1618: Dutch Republic ===
Rijksdaalder of the Dutch Republic, 1622

The pace of depreciation of the Gulden quickened in the second half of the 16th century amidst the huge influx of precious metals from Germany and Spanish America arriving through the Habsburg Netherlands.

The loss in silver content of local Dutch coins in the form of stuivers, schellings (6 stuivers) and daalders (1 1/2 gulden or 30 stuivers) was the result of different provinces continually testing the market with coins of slightly reduced silver, aiming for their acceptance at par with full-bodied coins. As the Northern Dutch Republic just declared its independence from the Spanish crown, there was no central authority powerful enough to penalize the provinces responsible for the deterioration of the quality of Dutch currency. The inevitable official acceptance of new, debased rates for the gulden only set the stage for the next round of depreciations.

As a result, the gulden equivalent of different trade coins passing through the Low Countries also rose in value, as follows:

- The German Reichsthaler of 25.98 g fine silver was valued at 32 stuivers (1.6 G) in 1566.
- The Dutch Republic's leeuwendaalder (lion dollar) of 20.57 g fine silver was valued at 32 stuivers (1.6 G) in 1575.
- The Dutch Republic's Rijksdaalder of 25.40 g fine silver, a local version of the German reichsthaler, was valued at 42 stuivers (2.1 G) in 1583, and repeatedly raised in value until it reached 50 stuivers (2.5 G) in 1618 – hence, 10.16 g silver in a gulden.
- The Spanish Netherlands' Patagon or Albertus thaler of 24.56 g fine silver, valued at 8 shillings Flemish (48 stuivers, 2.4 G) in 1618.
- The Spanish Netherlands' ducaton of 30.70 g fine silver, valued at 10 shillings Flemish (60 stuivers, 3 G) in 1618.

The solution which immediately halted the downward spiral of the gulden was the establishment of the Amsterdam Wisselbank (Bank of Amsterdam) in 1609, mandated to accept and assay the bullion content of coins received from its depositors, and then to credit the equivalent of 1 Rijksdaalder (2 1/2 gulden after 1618) for each 25.40 g fine silver actually received. Combined with rules requiring payments above 600 gulden to be cleared through the bank, it halted incentives for provinces to tamper with the silver content of its coins.

In 1626, Pieter Schaghen wrote in Dutch of the purchase of "the Island Manhattes" (Manhattan) "from the Indians for the value of 60 guilders".

=== 1659: Gulden currency and banco ===
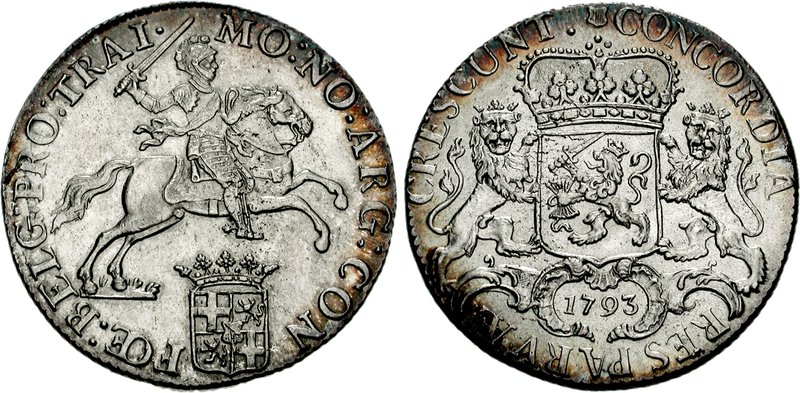
Silver rider Ducaton of the Dutch Republic

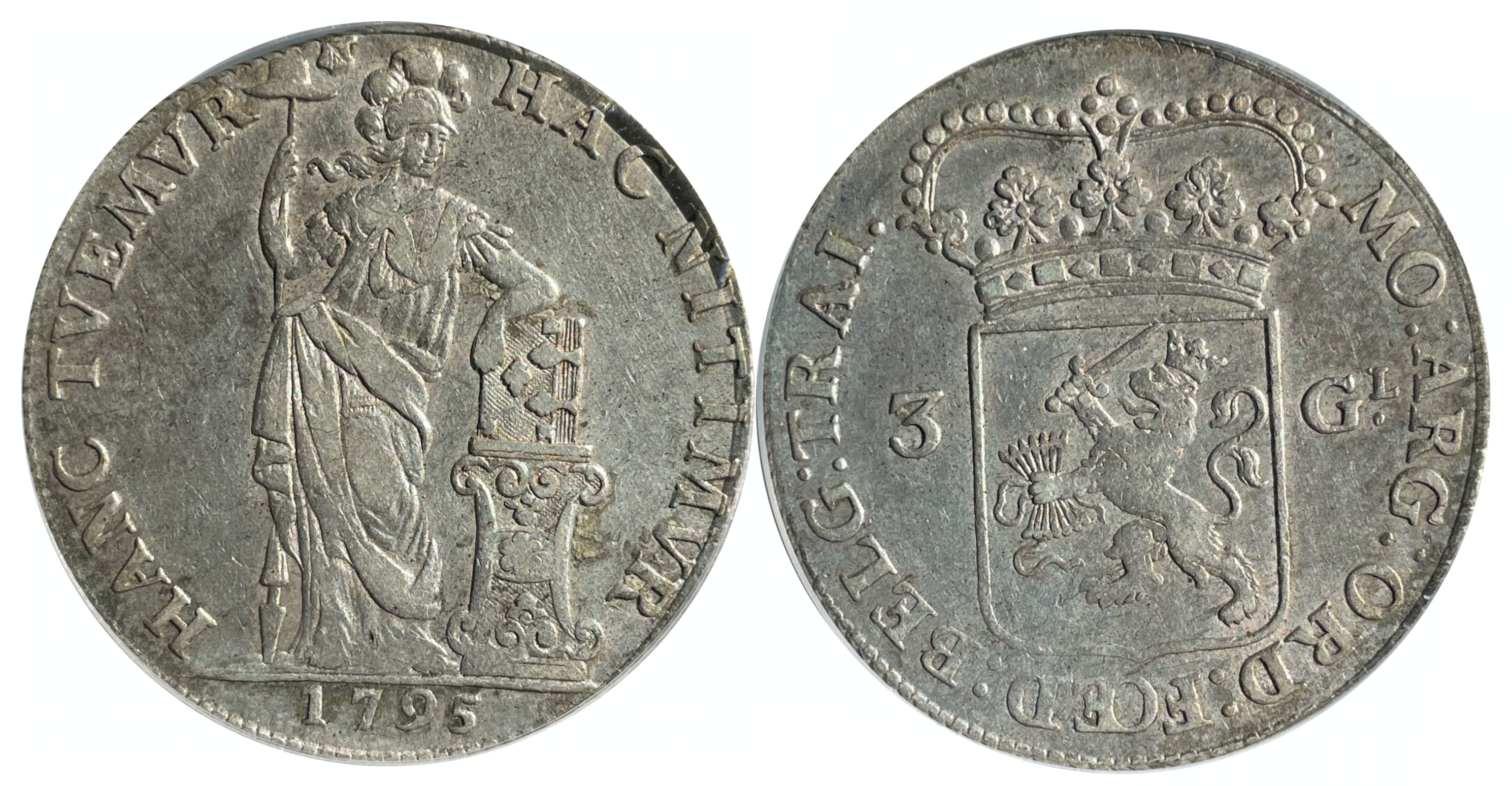
Silver coin: 3 gulden Utrecht, Dutch Republic, 1795

Even with the Bank of Amsterdam's success in halting the depreciation of Dutch currency, attempts to further increase the stuiver equivalent of trade coins continued among the provinces. After the 1630s came moves to raise the Patagon's value from 48 to 50 stuivers (4.17% advance), followed by moves to raise the Ducaton's value from 60 to 63 stuivers (5.0% advance). Fearing damage to its Europe-wide reputation if 50-stuiver deposits in rixdollars were repaid in cheaper 50-stuiver patagons, in the 1640s the bank firmly rejected the advanced values of these coins and upheld its old values of 48 and 60 stuivers.

This was the origin of a permanent Gulden Banco valued at 5% more against provincial Gulden currency valuations. In 1659 the Dutch Republic made this duality permanent by issuing its own trade coins, namely:

- The silver ducat (zilveren dukaat; also called Rijksdaalder) of 24.36 g fine silver, replacing the Patagon and valued at 48 stuivers banco (2.4 GB) or 50 stuivers currency (2.5 G).
- The Silver Rider Ducaton of 30.45 g fine silver, replacing the Ducaton and valued at 60 stuivers banco (3 GB) or 63 stuivers currency (3.15 G).

The result was a gulden banco unit of 10.15 g silver and a gulden currency unit of 9.67 g silver as determined from the ducaton. These reforms helped cement the Dutch Republic's role as Europe's financial center, made the Bank of Amsterdam the world's first modern central bank, and made the bank-stabilized gulden as Europe's de facto reserve currency until the end of the 18th century. In 1694, a new mint ordinance recognized the gulden as a valid coin for the entire Republic.

As the bank was also an active reseller of negotiepenningen, or trade coins that happen to be undervalued in the Netherlands (e.g. older rixdollars still valued at 50 stuivers currency), Dutch trade coins like lion dollars, rixdollars and silver ducats were exported and became staple currency for the rest of Europe until the end of the 18th century. The Royal Dutch Mint still mints the famed silver ducat to this day.

A silver 1-gulden denomination weighing 10.61 g, 0.91 fine, was minted by the States of Holland and West Friesland in 1680. The gulden design featured Pallas Athena standing, holding a spear topped by a hat in her right hand, resting with her left forearm on Gospels set on an ornate basis, with a small shield in the legend.

=== 19th century: United Netherlands ===
Following the collapse of the Bank of Amsterdam in the aftermath of the Napoleonic Wars, in 1817 the United Kingdom of the Netherlands redefined the Gulden as either 9.613 g silver or 0.60561 g gold. It was decimally divided into 100 cents, and the 1-gulden coin was permanently issued. This standard was doomed to fail due to

- the existence in the former Austrian Netherlands of silver kronenthalers of 25.71 g fine silver valued at 2.7 gulden (hence, only 9.52 g per gulden), and
- the gulden's gold equivalent of 0.60561 g, at a gold–silver ratio of 15.5 in neighboring France, being worth only 9.39 g in silver.

Following Belgium's secession from the Netherlands in 1830, a more permanent solution was implemented in 1840 by reducing the gulden to 9.45 g fine silver and repealing its fixed equivalence in gold.

=== Gold standard ===
As a result of the adoption of the gold standard by the newly established German Empire in 1873, the Netherlands in 1875 repealed the free coinage of silver into gulden coins, substituted by the free coinage of gold into 10-gulden coins containing 6.048 g fine gold. This arrangement continued until the worldwide suspension of the gold standard in 1914 due to the First World War. The gold standard was revived in 1925 but was abandoned in 1936.

=== After 1914 ===
In 1914, the guilder was traded at a rate of 2.46 guilders = 1 U.S. dollar. As of 1938, the rate was 1.82 guilders = 1 U.S. dollar. One Dutch guilder in 1914 could buy roughly the same amount of goods and services as US$10.02 or €8.17 in December 2017. In 1938, the guilder purchasing power would be approximately equal to US$9.54 or €7.78 in December 2017. Overall, the guilder remained a very stable currency and was also the third highest-valued currency unit in Europe in the interwar period (after the British pound sterling and the Irish pound, which, at this time, were pegged to each other at par).

Following the German occupation, on 10 May 1940, the guilder was pegged to the Reichsmark at a rate of 1 guilder = 1.5 Reichsmark. This rate was reduced to 1.327 on 17 July of the same year. The liberating Allied forces set an exchange rate of 2.652 guilders = 1 U.S. dollar, which became the peg for the guilder within the Bretton Woods system. In 1949, the peg was changed to 3.8 guilders = 1 dollar, approximately matching the devaluation of the British pound. In 1961, the guilder was revalued to 3.62 guilders = 1 dollar, a change approximately in line with that of the German mark. After 1967 guilders were made from nickel instead of silver.

=== Euro changeover ===
In 2002, the guilder was replaced by the euro at an exchange rate of 2.20371 guilders = €1. Coins remained exchangeable for euros at branches of the Netherlands Central Bank until 1 January 2007. Most guilder banknotes that were valid at the time of conversion can be exchanged until the deadline of 1 January 2032. There are some exceptions to this, and furthermore no banknote received as payment for commercial goods or services after 27 January 2002 is exchangeable. See Banknotes of the Dutch guilder for a full list of guilder banknotes and their last valid exchange date.

== Coins ==
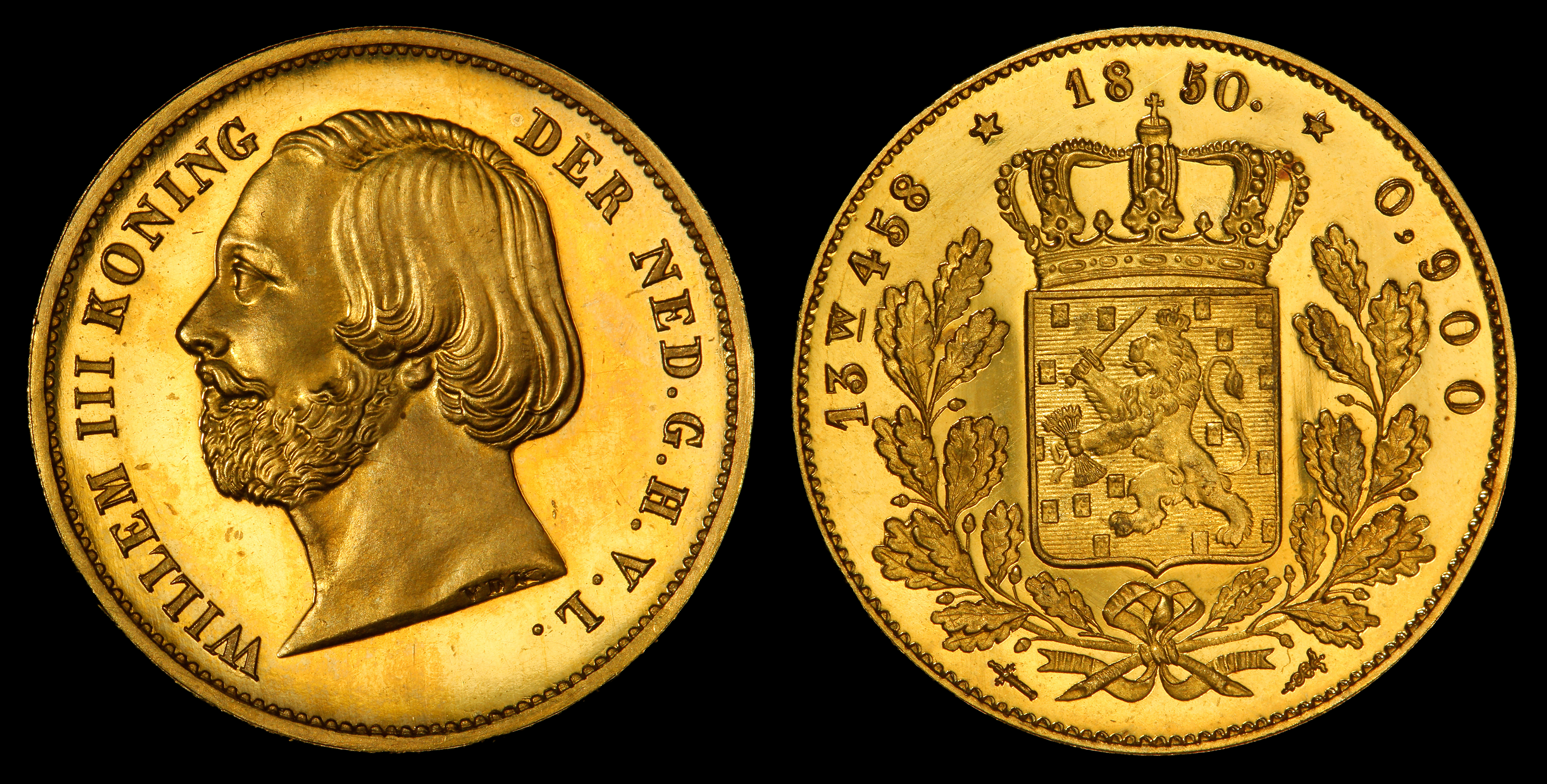
William III of the Netherlands depicted on a 20-guilder proof gold coin (1850)

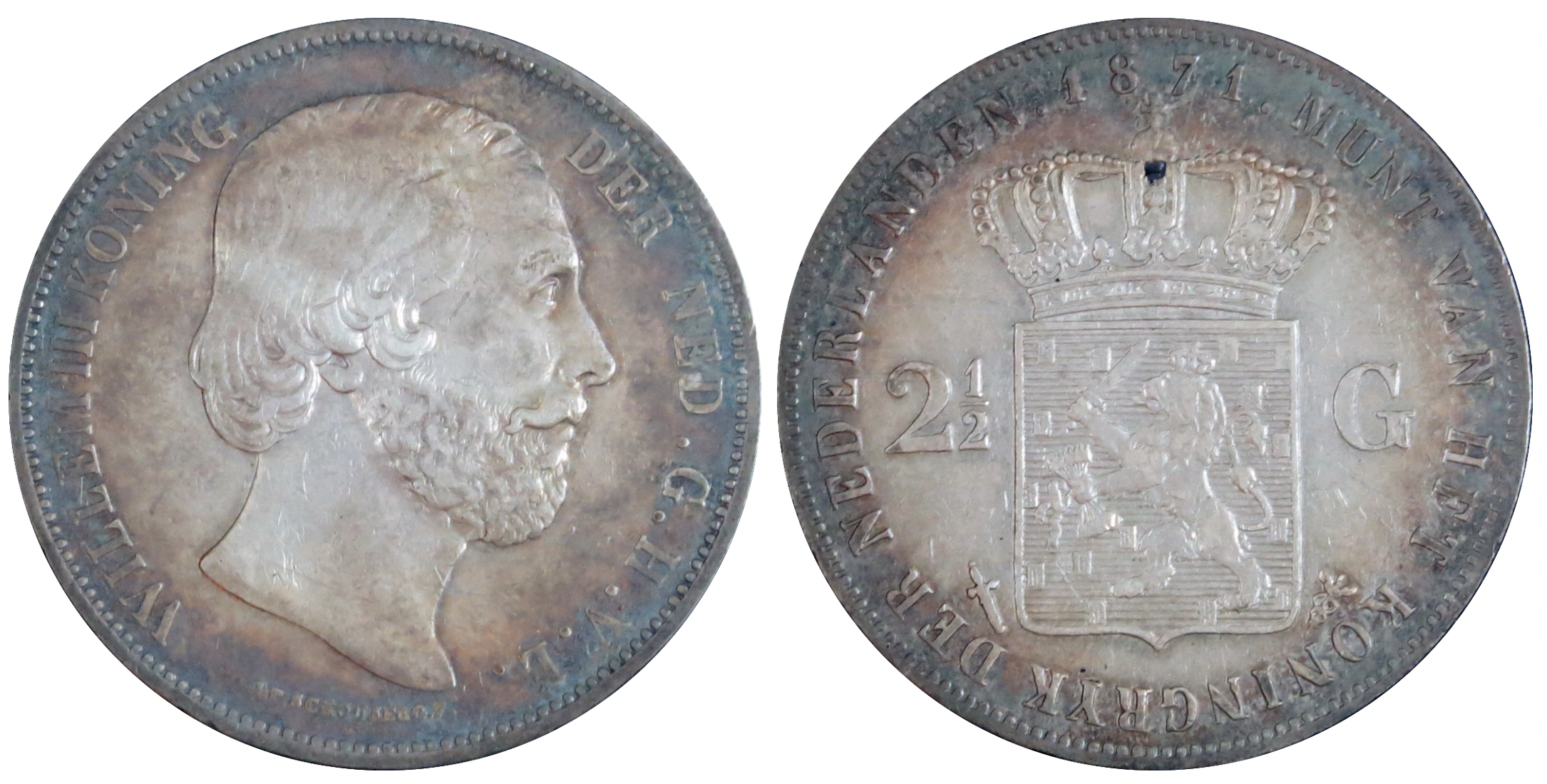
Silver coin: 2 1/2 gulden Willem III - 1871

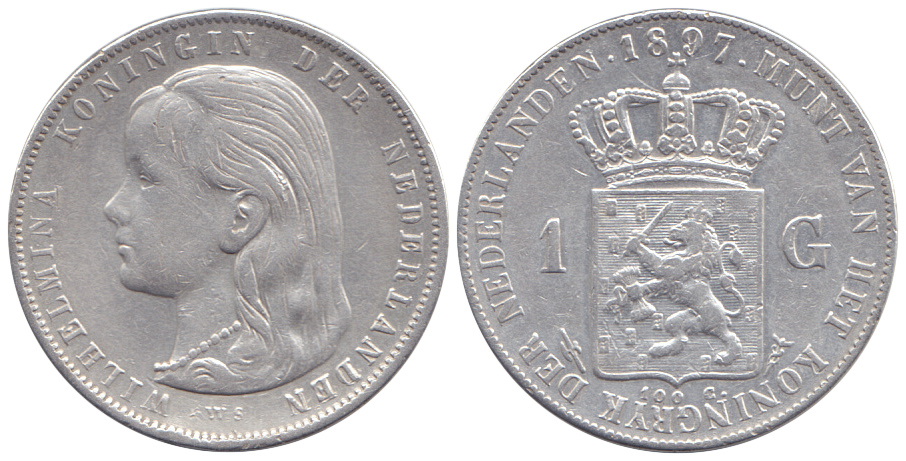
Guilder, 1897 (1st type of obverse). Queen Wilhelmina. Silver.

Zinc coins minted in the 1940s during the German occupation of the Netherlands (obverse)

Zinc coins minted in the 1940s during the German occupation of the Netherlands (reverse)

In the 18th century, coins were issued by the various provinces. There were copper 1 duit, silver 1, 2, 6 and 10 stuivers, 1 and 3 guilders, 1/2 and 1 silver ducat rijksdaalder and 1/2 and 1 silver rider ducaton. Gold 1 and 2 ducat trade coins were also minted. Between 1795 and 1806, the Batavian Republic issued coins in similar denominations to the earlier provincial issues. The Kingdom of Holland minted silver 10 stuivers, 1 florin and 1 guilder (equivalent), 50 stuivers and 2 1/2 guilder (also equivalent) and 1 rijksdaalder, along with gold 10 and 20 guilders. Before decimalization, the Kingdom of the Netherlands briefly issued some 1 rijksdaalder coins.

The gold 1 and 2 ducat and silver ducat (rijksdaalder) are still minted today as bullion coins.

In 1817, the first coins of the decimal currency were issued, the copper 1 cent and silver 3 guilders. The remaining denominations were introduced in 1818. These were copper 1/2 cents, silver 5, 10 and 25 cents, 1/2 and 1 guilder, and gold 10 guilders. In 1826, gold 5-guilder coins were introduced.

In 1840, the silver content of the coinage was reduced (see above) and this was marked by the replacement of the 3 guilder coin by a 2 1/2 guilder piece. The gold coinage was completely suspended in 1853, five years after the suspension of the gold standard. By 1874, production of silver coins greater in value than 10 cents had ceased, to be only fully resumed in the 1890s. Gold 10 guilder coins were struck again from 1875. In 1877, bronze 2 1/2 cent coins were introduced. In 1907, silver 5-cent coins were replaced by round, cupro-nickel pieces. These were later replaced in 1913 by square shaped 5 cent pieces. In 1912, gold 5-guilder coins were reintroduced but the gold coinage was ended in 1933. The 1/2 guilder saw discontinuation after 1930. Throughout the Wilhelmina period, a number of infrequent changes were made to the 10 and 25 cent coins as well, with the largest changes being periodic updates of the Queen's effigy and smaller changes to designs on the reverse (back).

In 1941, following the German occupation, production of all earlier coin types ceased and zinc coins were introduced by the occupational government for 1, 2 1/2, 5, 10 and 25 cents. Large quantities of pre-war type silver 10 and 25 cent and 1 guilder coins were minted in the United States between 1943 and 1945 for use following liberation. Afterwards, the zinc coins were quickly demonetized and melted.

At the time of withdrawal in 2002, the following denominations of coins were circulating:

- 5 cents (€0.023) – stuiver—the name survived, although the stuiver had not been an official subunit of the guilder since decimalisation in 1817;
- 10 cents (€0.045) – dubbeltje ('little double')—being small enough to fit into the center hole of a compact disc, it was the smallest coin in circulation. It was worth two stuivers, hence the name;
- 25 cents (€0.11) – kwartje ('little quarter')—the kwartje was smaller than the stuiver, though larger than the dubbeltje and the cent;
- 1 guilder (€0.45) – gulden, colloquially piek;
- 2 1/2 guilders (€1.13) – rijksdaalder, colloquially riks or knaak;
- 5 guilders (€2.27) – vijfje ('little five');

=== Post-war series ===
In 1948, all half cents and 2 1/2 cents were taken out of circulation, though no further production of either denomination had continued after 1940 and 1942, respectively. New bronze 1 and 5 cent coins featuring Queen Wilhelmina on the obverse were issued, phasing out previous types. At the same time, new nickel 10 and 25 cent coins were introduced. In 1949, 1 and 2 1/2 guilder banknotes were introduced. Five years later, the silver 1-guilder coin was reintroduced, followed by the silver 2 1/2 guilder coin in 1959. The silver content was replaced with nickel in 1967, although no 2 1/2 guilder coins were minted in 1967 and 1968. The silver coins were demonetized in 1973. In 1950, Queen Juliana's profile replaced the image of Wilhelmina on the obverse (front) of all coins.

In 1980, production of the 1-cent coin ceased and was demonetized three years later. Soon after, it was decided to replace the 5-guilder banknote with a coin of the same value. However, it was not until 1988 that a bronze-coated nickel 5 guilder coin was finally introduced. The 5 guilder banknote remained legal tender until 1995. The 2 1/2 guilder coin gradually began losing widespread use shortly after the introduction of the 5 guilder coin, and mintage figures for the denomination declined until the discontinuation of the guilder. 1980 also saw a circulating two coin commemorative series of 1 and 2 1/2 guilder coins celebrating Queen Beatrix's ascension to the throne.

Post-war series (1948) Designer: L. O. Wenckebach
Image	Value	Technical parameters			Description			Issued from	Withdrawn
Image	Value	Diameter (mm)	Mass (g)	Composition	Edge	Obverse	Reverse	Issued from	Withdrawn
	ƒ 0.01	14.00	2.00	Bronze	Smooth	Queen Wilhelmina (1948); Queen Juliana (from 1950)	Value; year of issue	1948–1980	1983
	ƒ 0.05	21.00	3.50	Bronze	Smooth	Queen Wilhelmina (1948); Queen Juliana (from 1950)	Orange branch; value; year of issue	1948–1980	2002
	ƒ 0.10	15.00	1.50	Nickel	Reeded	Queen Wilhelmina (1948); Queen Juliana (from 1950)	Crown; value; year of issue	1948–1980	2002
	ƒ 0.25	19.00	3.00	Nickel	Reeded	Queen Wilhelmina (1948); Queen Juliana (from 1950)	Crown; value; year of issue	1948–1980	2002
	ƒ 1	25.00	6.50	Silver: 72%	Lettering: GOD ★ ZIJ ★ MET ★ ONS ★	Queen Juliana	Coat of arms; Lettering: Nederland; value; year of issue	1954–1967	1973
	ƒ 1	25.00	6.00	Nickel	Lettering: GOD ★ ZIJ ★ MET ★ ONS ★	Queen Juliana	Coat of arms; Lettering: Nederland; value; year of issue	1967–1980	2002
	ƒ 2½	33.00	15.00	Silver: 72%	Lettering: GOD ★ ZIJ ★ MET ★ ONS ★	Queen Juliana	Coat of arms; Lettering: Nederland; value; year of issue	1959–1966	1973
	ƒ 2½	29.00	10.00	Nickel	Lettering: GOD ★ ZIJ ★ MET ★ ONS ★	Queen Juliana	Coat of arms; Lettering: Nederland; value; year of issue	1969–1980	2002

=== Last series ===
All circulating coins went through a complete redesign in 1982, a short while after Queen Beatrix's coronation. They depict abstract designs featuring grids and a layered silhouette profile of the Queen as opposed to the more formal designs of the previous generation of coins. Production of these coins ceased after 2001.

All the coins carried a profile image of the Queen on the obverse and a simple grid on the other side. The 1-guilder, 2 1/2 guilder, and five guilder coins had God zij met ons ('God be with us') inscribed on the edge.

Last series (1982) Designer: Bruno Ninaber van Eyben
Image	Value	Technical parameters			Description			Issued from	Withdrawn	Lapse
Image	Value	Diameter (mm)	Mass (g)	Composition	Edge	Obverse	Reverse	Issued from	Withdrawn	Lapse
	ƒ 0.05	21.00	3.50	Bronze	Smooth	Queen Beatrix	Value; year of issue	1982–2001	2002	2007
	ƒ 0.10	15.00	1.50	Nickel	Reeded	Queen Beatrix	Value; year of issue	1982–2001	2002	2007
	ƒ 0.25	19.00	3.00	Nickel	Reeded	Queen Beatrix	Value; year of issue	1982–2001	2002	2007
	ƒ 1	25.00	6.00	Nickel	Lettering: GOD ★ ZIJ ★ MET ★ ONS ★	Queen Beatrix	Value; year of issue	1982–2001	2002	2007
	ƒ 2½	29.00	10.00	Nickel	Lettering: GOD ★ ZIJ ★ MET ★ ONS ★	Queen Beatrix	Value; year of issue	1982–2001	2002	2007
	ƒ 5	23.50	9.25	Nickel-bronze	Reeded lettering: GOD ★ ZIJ ★ MET ★ ONS ★	Queen Beatrix	Value; year of issue	1987–2001	2002	2007

== Banknotes ==
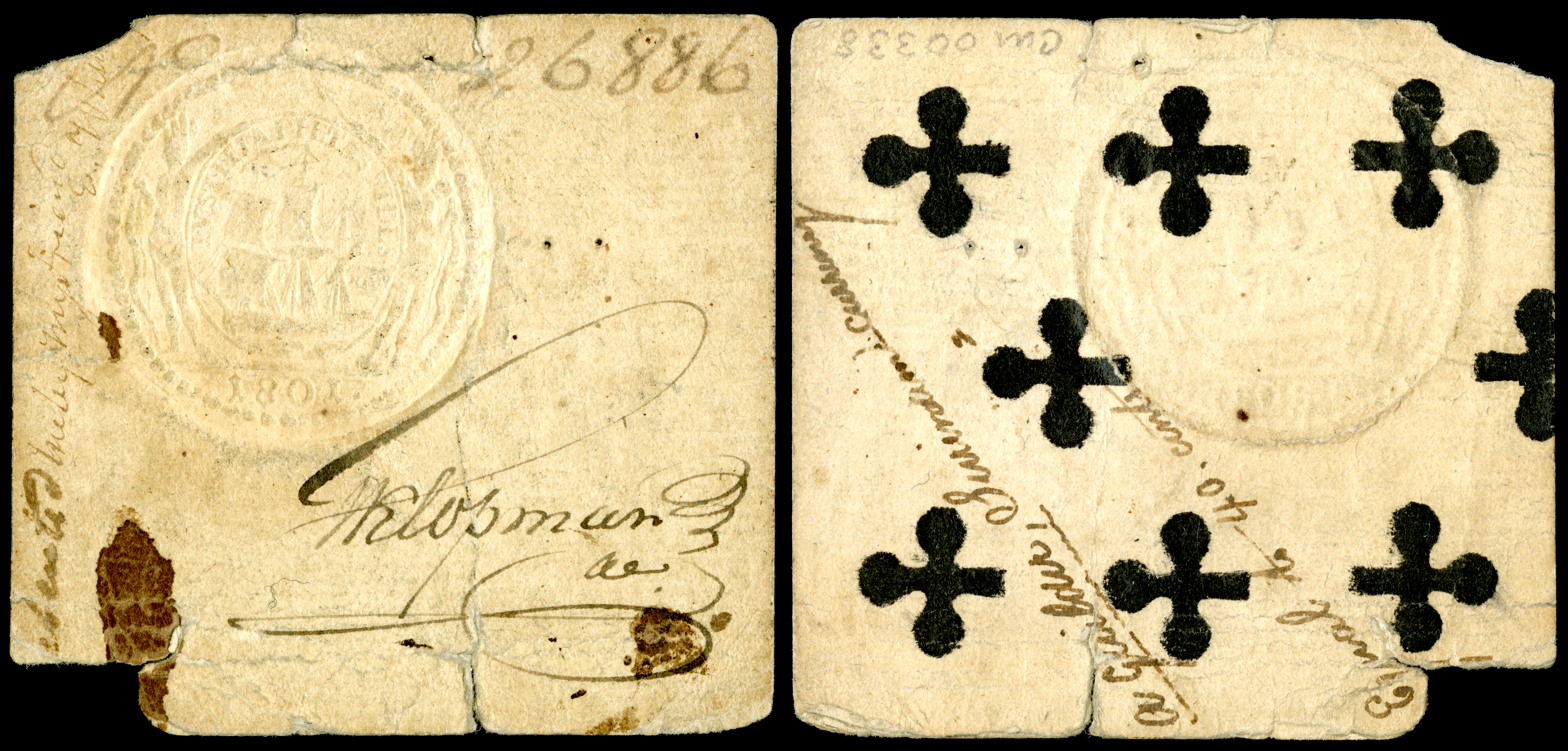
One guilder, playing card money (1801). Prior to the formal introduction of paper currency, playing card money, denominated in Dutch guilders, was used in Dutch Guiana (1761–1826).

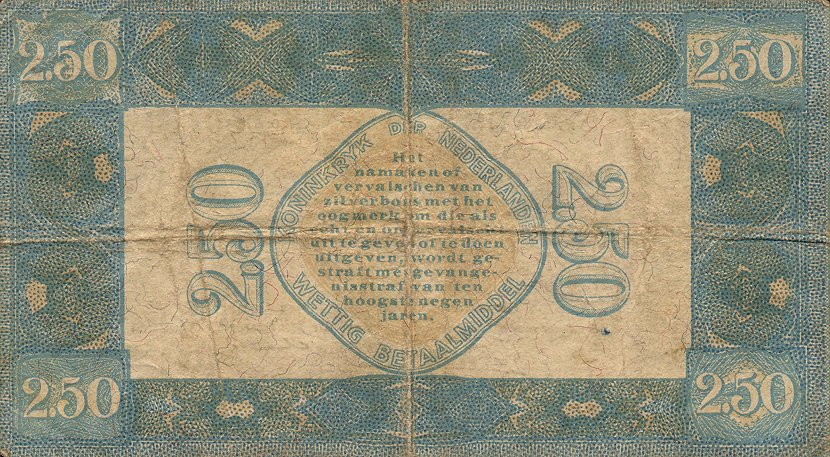
Dutch 2 1/2-guilder silver certificate from 1927

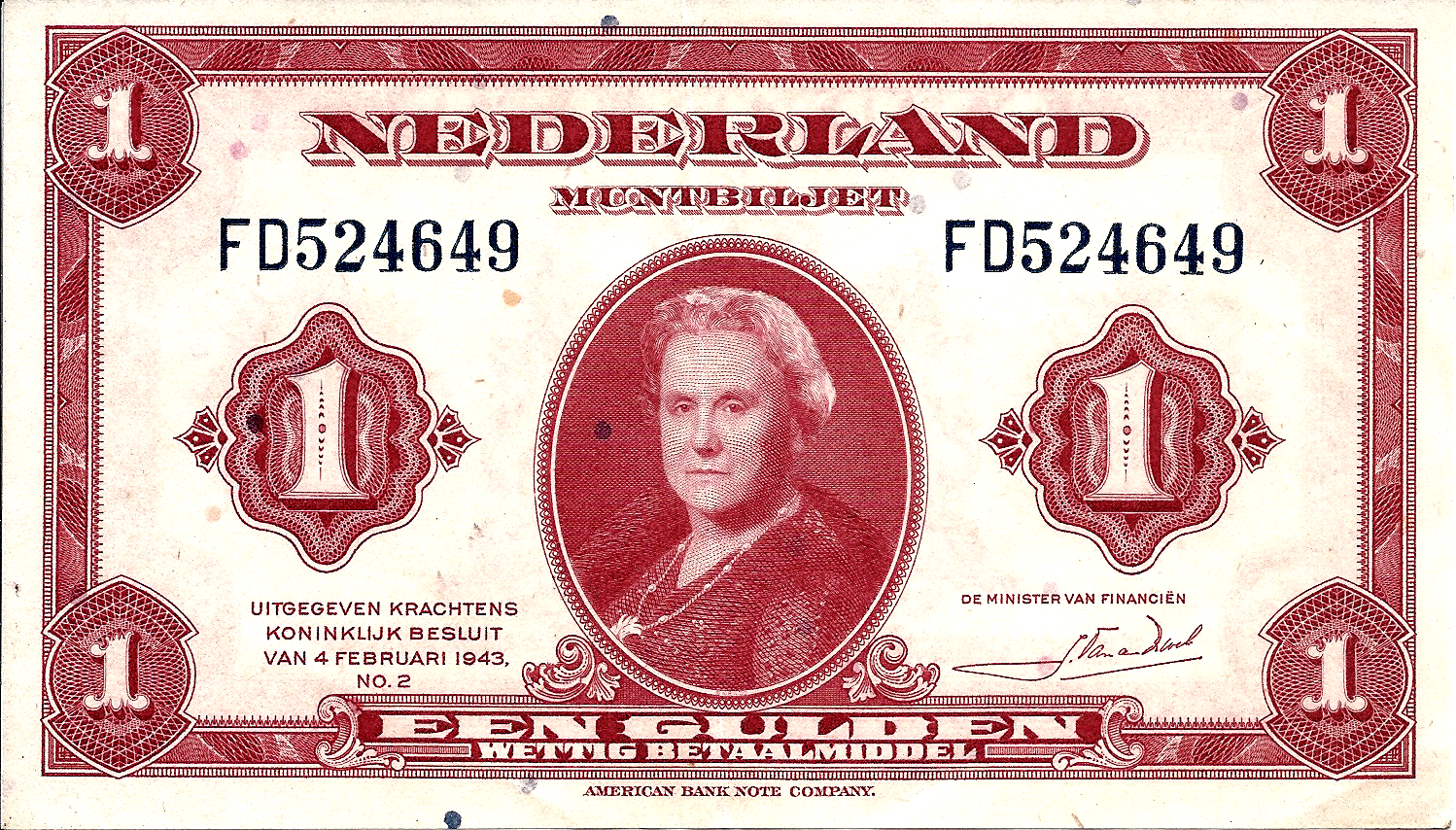
U.S.-printed Dutch guilder, 1943

Between 1814 and 1838, the Dutch Bank issued notes in denominations of 25, 40, 60, 80, 100, 200, 300, 500 and 1000 guilders. These were followed, from 1846 by state notes (muntbiljetten) in denominations of 5, 10, 20, 50, 100, 500, 1000 guilders, with the 10 and 50 guilders issued until 1914.

In 1904, the Dutch Bank recommenced the issuance of paper money. By 1911, it was issuing notes for 10, 25, 40, 60, 100, 200, 300 and 1000 guilders. In 1914, because of silver shortage for minting, the government introduced silver certificates (zilverbonnen) for 1, 2 1/2 and 5 guilders. Although the 5 guilder notes were only issued that year, the 1 guilder notes continued until 1920 and the 2 1/2 guilder until 1927.

In 1926, the Dutch Bank introduced 20 guilder notes, followed by 50 guilder in 1929 and 500 guilder in 1930. These introductions followed the cessation of production of the unusual 40, 60 and 300 guilder notes during the 1920s.

In 1938, silver notes were reintroduced for 1 and 2 1/2 guilders. During World War II, the Dutch Bank continued to issue paper money, although there were some design changes, most notably, the replacement of a portrait of Queen Emma by a Rembrandt portrait on the 10-guilder note. The Allies printed state notes dated 1943 for use following liberation. These were in denominations of 1, 2 1/2, 10, 25, 50 and 100 guilders. More state notes were issued for 1 and 2 1/2 guilders in 1945 and 1949.

Following the war, the Dutch Bank introduced notes for 10, 20, 25, 50, 100 and 1000 guilders. The last 20 guilder notes were dated 1955, whilst 5 guilder notes were introduced in 1966 (replaced by coins in 1988) and 250 guilder notes in 1985.

At the time of withdrawal, the following denominations of banknotes were circulating:

- ƒ10 (€4.54) – tientje ('little ten'), joet, IJsvogel ('kingfisher')
- ƒ25 (€11.34) – geeltje ('yellow one')
- ƒ50 (€22.69) – zonnebloem ('sunflower')
- ƒ100 (€45.38) – honderdje, meier, snip ('snipe')
- ƒ250 (€113.45) – vuurtoren ('lighthouse')
- ƒ1000 (€453.78) – duizendje, rooie / rooitje

All but the 50 and 250 guilder notes had been issued in a new series that was the same colour as the older notes, but with a mostly abstract pattern, featuring a different bird for each denomination.

Persons depicted on those older banknotes were:

- ƒ5 – poet Joost van den Vondel (the note was replaced by a ƒ5 coin in 1988 and withdrawn entirely in 1995)
- ƒ10 – painter Frans Hals
- ƒ25 – composer Jan Pieterszoon Sweelinck
- ƒ100 – admiral Michiel de Ruyter (this note, being the most profitable note to counterfeit, was the first to be replaced)
- ƒ1000 – philosopher Baruch Spinoza

These 1970s "face"-notes and the 1980s ƒ50 (sunflower), ƒ100 (snipe), and ƒ250 (lighthouse) banknotes were designed by Ootje Oxenaar. Eventually, these notes were progressively replaced from 1990 onwards by notes featuring intricate abstract designs made by Jaap Drupsteen, with new designs for the ƒ10, ƒ25, ƒ100, and ƒ1000 introduced before the discontinuation of the guilder for the euro.

An anti-counterfeit warning appeared on the reverse side of all guilder banknotes prior to the final series with the exception of the ƒ250 "lighthouse" note, repeated multiple times in microprint (a technique later used on some banknotes of the Indonesian rupiah):

Wetboek van Strafrecht Artikel 208: Hij die muntspeciën of munt- of bankbiljetten namaakt of vervalst, met het oogmerk om die muntspeciën of munt- of bankbiljetten als echt en onvervalst uit te geven of te doen uitgeven, wordt gestraft met gevangenisstraf van ten hoogste negen jaren.

Criminal Code Article 208: Anyone who counterfeits or falsifies coins or banknotes with the intention of issuing or having them issued as genuine and unaltered shall be punished with a prison sentence of no more than nine years.

Eventually, this warning was replaced with a subtle message on the obverse side, "De namaker of vervalser wordt gestraft" (Counterfeiters or falsifiers will be punished), which also referenced the aforementioned Article 208.

=== Forebearers II and Nature series ===
Forebears II series (1966–1973) Designer: Ootje Oxenaar
Image	Value	Euro equivalent	Dimensions (mm)	Main colour	Description		Issue	Withdrawn	Lapse
Image	Value	Euro equivalent	Dimensions (mm)	Main colour	Obverse	Reverse	Issue	Withdrawn	Lapse
	ƒ 5	€2.27	136 × 76	Green	Joost van den Vondel	Stadsschouwburg	19 December 1966	1 May 1995	1 May 2025
	ƒ 5	€2.27	136 × 76	Green	Joost van den Vondel	Stadsschouwburg	14 June 1976	1 May 1995	1 May 2025
	ƒ 10	€4.54	142 × 76	Blue	Frans Hals	Cylinder pattern	4 January 1971	1 January 2002	1 January 2032
	ƒ 25	€11.34	148 × 76	Red	J. P. Sweelinck	Sound waves	15 December 1972	1 May 1995	1 May 2025
	ƒ 100	€45.38	154 × 76	Brown	Michiel de Ruyter	Compass rose	15 December 1972	23 July 1986	23 July 2016
	ƒ 1000	€453.78	160 × 76	Dark green	Baruch de Spinoza	Triangular patterns	15 January 1973	1 January 2002	1 January 2032
Nature series (1981–1986) Designer: Ootje Oxenaar
	ƒ 50	€22.69	148 × 76	Yellow	Sunflower	IJsselmeer polders; map of Flevoland; field of sunflowers	7 September 1982	1 January 2002	1 January 2032
	ƒ 100	€45.38	154 × 76	Brown	Common snipe	Great snipe	16 March 1981	1 January 2002	1 January 2032
	ƒ 250	€113.45	160 × 76	Purple	Westerlichttoren	Bornrif and coastline; list of West Frisian islands	7 January 1986	1 January 2002	1 January 2032

=== Last series ===
Ornamental series (1993–1997) Designer: Jaap Drupsteen
Image	Value	Euro equivalent	Dimensions (mm)	Main colour	Description			Issue	Withdrawn	Lapse
Image	Value	Euro equivalent	Dimensions (mm)	Main colour	Watermark	See-through register	Microlettering (on reverse)	Issue	Withdrawn	Lapse
	ƒ 10	€4.54	136 × 76	Blue	Kingfisher	Stickleback	IJsvogel by Arie van den Berg, authentication guide	1 September 1997	1 January 2002	1 January 2032
	ƒ 25	€11.34	142 × 76	Red	Robin	Poppy, tulip	Authentication guide	27 March 1990	1 January 2002	1 January 2032
	ƒ 100	€45.38	154 × 76	Brown	Little owl	Mouse	De uil by C. Buddingh', authentication guide	7 September 1993	1 January 2002	1 January 2032
	ƒ 1000	€453.78	166 × 76	Green	Lapwing	Lapwing egg	Het briefje van duizend by Koos van Zomeren, authentication guide	3 April 1996	1 January 2002	1 January 2032

== See also ==
- Aruban florin
- Caribbean guilder
- Adoption of the euro in the Netherlands
- Dutch euro coins
- Economy of the Netherlands
- Netherlands Antillean guilder
- Netherlands Indian guilder

Preceded by gros / grote of France, Flanders, Brabant (1434)	Dutch currency 1434–2002^{1} 1434–1832 (Belgium); 1434–1839 (Luxembourg); 1828–1940 (Netherlands Antilles); 1828–1962 (Surinam)	Succeeded by Euro (2002, Netherlands); Belgian franc (1832, Belgium, 1839, Luxembourg), Netherlands Antillean guilder (1940, Netherlands Antilles), Surinamese guilder (1962, Suriname)
