= Dutch euro coins =

Designs of Dutch currency

Dutch euro coins currently use two designs by Erwin Olaf, both of which feature a portrait of King Willem-Alexander of the Netherlands. The new designs began circulating in 2014. Dutch Euro coins minted from 1999 to 2013 feature a portrait of Queen Beatrix designed by Bruno Ninaber van Eyben. All coins share the 12 stars of the EU and the year of imprint in their design.

This coin comes from the second series, with king Willem-Alexander of the Netherlands

As is the case in Finland, most Dutch shops have elected not to issue one and two cent coins starting on 1 September 2004, though the coins remain legal tender. Sums are rounded to the nearest five cents; sums ending in 1, 2, 6 or 7 cents are rounded down, and those ending in 3, 4, 8 or 9 cents are rounded up. The rounding is applied to the grand total only, while individual prices are still shown and summed up with €0.01 precision. This method is known as "Swedish rounding".

== Dutch euro design ==
For images of the common side and a detailed description of the coins, see euro coins.

The first sets of euro coins were minted in 1999 and the euro was put into circulation in the eurozone in 2002. Like Belgium, Finland, France and Spain, the first euro coins of the Netherlands are marked 1999, not 2002.

=== First series (1999–2013): Queen Beatrix ===
Depiction of Dutch euro coinage (1999–2013) | Obverse side
€ 0.01	€ 0.02	€ 0.05
Portrait of Queen Beatrix, her title around the edge.
€ 0.10	€ 0.20	€ 0.50
Portrait of Queen Beatrix, her title around the edge.
€ 1.00	€ 2.00	€ 2 Coin Edge
		The edge lettering features the words GOD ★ ZIJ ★ MET ★ ONS (God Be With Us). The same lettering had been applied to the larger guilder coins.
Half portrait of Queen Beatrix, her title vertically shown as in the former guilder.		The edge lettering features the words GOD ★ ZIJ ★ MET ★ ONS (God Be With Us). The same lettering had been applied to the larger guilder coins.

=== Second series (2014–present): King Willem Alexander ===
Queen Beatrix abdicated on 30 April 2013, so the design of the coins was changed for her heir, King Willem-Alexander of the Netherlands. The Royal Dutch Mint presented the new design to the public on 31 October 2013. Production of the new coins commenced on 22 January 2014. The first coins were released into circulation the next day.

Depiction of Dutch euro coinage (2014–present) | Obverse side
€ 0.01	€ 0.02	€ 0.05
Portrait of King Willem-Alexander, his title vertical across the coins center.
€ 0.10	€ 0.20	€ 0.50
Portrait of King Willem-Alexander, his title vertical across the coins center.
€ 1.00	€ 2.00	€ 2 Coin Edge
		The edge lettering features the words GOD ★ ZIJ ★ MET ★ ONS (God Be With Us). The same lettering had been applied to the larger guilder coins.
Portrait of King Willem-Alexander, his title shown vertical on the right side.		The edge lettering features the words GOD ★ ZIJ ★ MET ★ ONS (God Be With Us). The same lettering had been applied to the larger guilder coins.

== Circulating mintage quantities ==
Face Value	€0.01	€0.02	€0.05	€0.10	€0.20	€0.50	€1.00	€2.00
1999	47,800,000	109,000,000	213,000,000	149,700,000	86,500,000	99,600,000	63,500,000	9,900,000
2000	276,800,000	122,000,000	184,200,000	156,700,000	67,500,000	87,000,000	62,800,000	24,400,000
2001	179,300,000	145,800,000	205,900,000	193,500,000	97,600,000	94,500,000	67,900,000	140,500,000
2002	800,000	53,100,000	900,000	800,000	51,200,000	80,900,000	20,100,000	37,200,000
2003	58,100,000	151,200,000	1,400,000	1,200,000	58,200,000	1,200,000	1,400,000	1,200,000
2004	113,900,000	115,700,000	400,000	400,000	20,500,000	300,000	300,000	300,000
2005	400,000	400,000	80,400,000	300,000	300,000	300,000	200,000	200,000
2006	200,000	200,000	60,100,000	100,000	100,000	100,000	100,000	100,000
2007	200,000	200,000	78,600,000	200,000	200,000	200,000	100,000	100,000
2008	413,000	413,000	50,413,000	363,000	363,000	363,000	288,000	288,000
2009	254,000	249,000	40,299,000	209,000	209,000	209,000	149,000	149,000
2010	235,000	235,000	70,235,000	202,000	202,000	202,000	166,000	166,000
2011	300,000	300,000	20,300,000	200,000	200,000	200,000	200,000	3,900,000
2012	400,000	200,000	10,500,000	200,000	200,000	200,000	200,000	3,700,000
2013	200,000	200,000	26,200,000	200,000	200,000	200,000	100,000	10,800,000
2014	530,000	530,000	30,000,000	5,000,000	5,000,000	5,000,000	5,000,000	9,000,000
2015	400,000	400,000	55,400,000	400,000	400,000	400,000	300,000	300,000
2016	400,000	400,000	70,400,000	400,000	30,400,000	400,000	300,000	325,000
2017	100,000	s	63,100,000	20,300,000	100,000	s	s	s
2018	s	s	60,000,000	12,500,000	20,000,000	s	s	s
2019	s	s	30,000,000	15,000,000	s	s	s	s
2020	s	s	10,000,000	s	s	s	s	s
2021	s	s	s	s	s	s	s	s
2022	s	s	3,000,000	2,000,000	1,000,000	s	s	s
2023	s	s	25,000,000	12,000,000	16,000,000	5,000,000	s	s
s Small quantities minted for sets only

== Changes to national sides ==
The Commission of the European Communities issued a recommendation on 19 December 2008, a common guideline for the national sides and the issuance of euro coins intended for circulation. One section of this recommendation stipulates that:

Article 4. Design of the national sides:

"The national side of the euro coins intended for circulation should bear the 12 European stars that should fully surround the national design, including the year mark and the indication of the issuing Member State's name. The European stars should be depicted as on the European flag."

The first series of the Dutch euro coins did not comply with this recommendation. No efforts were made to amend these coins to make them compliant. The second series were made to be in accordance with this recommendation.

== €2 commemorative coins ==
Year	Subject	Volume	Note
2007	50th Anniversary of the Signature of the Treaty of Rome	6,333,000	commonly issued coin
2009	Ten years of Economic and Monetary Union (EMU) and the birth of the euro	5,300,000	commonly issued coin
2011	500th Anniversary of the Publication of The Praise of Folly by Desiderius Erasmus	4,000,000	
2012	10th Anniversary of Euro coins and banknotes	3,500,000	commonly issued coin
2013	Coronation of King Willem-Alexander	7,200,000	
2013	200 years Kingdom of the Netherlands	3,500,000	
2014	Kings double portrait	5,000,000	

== See also ==
- Adoption of the euro in the Netherlands
- Dutch guilder
- Aruban florin
- Netherlands Antillean guilder
- Netherlands Indian guilder
