= Jaap Drupsteen =

Dutch graphic designer

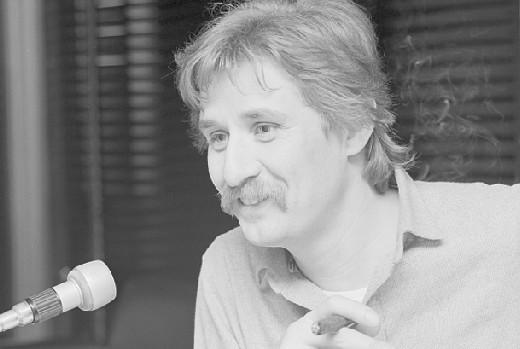
Jaap Drupsteen

Jaap Drupsteen (born 1942 in Hasselt (Overijssel)) is a Dutch graphic designer.

Drupsteen worked as a graphic designer for NOS and VPRO; he specialized in making station identifications, music videos, and other video and television productions.

His best known work are his designs for a series of banknotes for De Nederlandsche Bank. In 1999, Drupsteen was assigned by the Dutch government to design a new passport. He also designed several stamps for PTT. In the late 2000s, he designed the exterior of the Netherlands Institute for Sound and Vision in Hilversum.

== List of banknotes ==
Banknotes of Jaap Drupsteen
Pick No.	Value	Dimensions	Main Colour	Main motif and watermark	Date of issue	Date of circulation	Date of withdrawal
99	ƒ10	76 × 136 mm	Blue	Common kingfisher	1 July 1997	1 September 1997	28 January 2002
100	ƒ25	76 × 142 mm	Red	European robin	5 April 1989	27 March 1990	28 January 2002
101	ƒ100	76 × 154 mm	Brown	Little owl	9 January 1992	7 September 1993	28 January 2002
102	ƒ1 000	76 × 166 mm	Green	Northern lapwing	2 June 1994	3 April 1996	28 January 2002

== Prizes ==
- Nipkow Schijf (1976)
- Werkman Design Award (1980)
- Sikkens Award (1981)
- Prix Italia (1987)
- L.J. Jordaan Award for banknotes documentary (1988)
- Alblas Award en Holland Video Award (1990)
