= One cent coin (Netherlands) =

Coin worth one-hundredth of a Dutch guilder, used 1817-1980

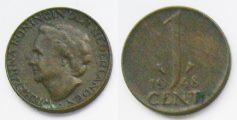
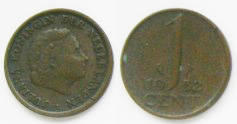
Reverse and obverse 1-cent coin 1948 and 1952.

The one-cent coin was a coin struck in the Kingdom of the Netherlands between 1817 and 1980. The coin was worth 1 cent or 1/100 of a Dutch guilder.

== Dimensions and weight ==
| Specifications | 1 cent 1817–1877 | 1 cent 1877–1941 | 1 cent 1941–1944 | 1 cent 1948–1980 | Refs |
|---|---|---|---|---|---|
| Gram | 3.85 g (1817–1837); 3.9 g (1860–1877) | 2.5 g (1877–1901); 2.6 g (1913–1941) | 2 g | 1.9 g (1948); 2 mm (1950–1980) | |
| Diameter | 22 mm | 19 mm | 17 mm | 17.1 mm | |
| Thickness | 1 mm | 1 mm | 1.5 mm | 1.2 mm (1948); 1.3 mm (1950–1980) | |
| Metal | Copper | Bronze | Zinc | Bronze | |

== Versions ==
| Monarch | Mint | Material | Obverse | Reverse | Edge | Minting years | Refs |
|---|---|---|---|---|---|---|---|
| William I | Utrecht and Brussels | Copper | Crowned W between the mint year | Crowned Dutch coat of arms between value | Smooth with no edge lettering | 1817–1819(U); 1821–1824(U and B); 1826–1828(U and B); 1830(U); 1831(U); 1837(U) | |
| William III | Utrecht | Copper | Crowned W between the mint year | Crowned Dutch coat of arms between value | Smooth with no edge lettering | 1860–1864; 1870; 1873; 1875–1877 | |
| William III | Utrecht | Bronze | Crowned lion with sword and quiver | Value between two bonded orange branches | Reeded with no edge lettering | 1877; 1878; 1880–1884 | |
| Wilhelmina | Utrecht | Bronze | Crowned lion with sword and quiver | Value between two bonded orange branches | Reeded with no edge lettering | 1892; 1896–1901 | |
| Wilhelmina | Utrecht | Bronze | Crowned lion with sword and quiver (smaller mint and mint master mark and lion manes longer) | Value between two bonded orange branches | Reeded with no edge lettering | 1902; 1904–1907 | |
| Wilhelmina | Utrecht and Philadelphia | Bronze | Crowned lion with sword and quiver (different crown and bigger lettering) | Value between two bonded orange branches (different orange branches and bigger lettering) | Reeded with no edge lettering | 1913–1922(U); 1924–1931(U); 1937–1941(U); 1942(P); 1943(P) | |
| German occupation coin (Note: The 1 cent coin made in the Netherlands during World War II was made of zinc, and worth 1/100, or 0.01, of the Dutch guilder. It was designed by Nico de Haas, a Dutch national-socialist. The respective mintage was of 31,800,000 (1941), 241,000,000 (1942), 71,000,000 (1943), and 29,600,000 (1944).) | Utrecht | Zinc | Strait cross with ribbon displaying ‘Nederland’ | Value with four waves and a cereal ear | Reeded with no edge lettering | 1941–1944 | |
| Wilhelmina | Utrecht | Bronze | Queens head to the left | Value | Smooth with no edge lettering | 1948 | |
| Juliana | Utrecht | Bronze | Queens head to the right | Value | Smooth with no edge lettering | 1950–1980 | |

== Gallery ==
Obverse and reverse of 1-cent coin 1941 and 1943
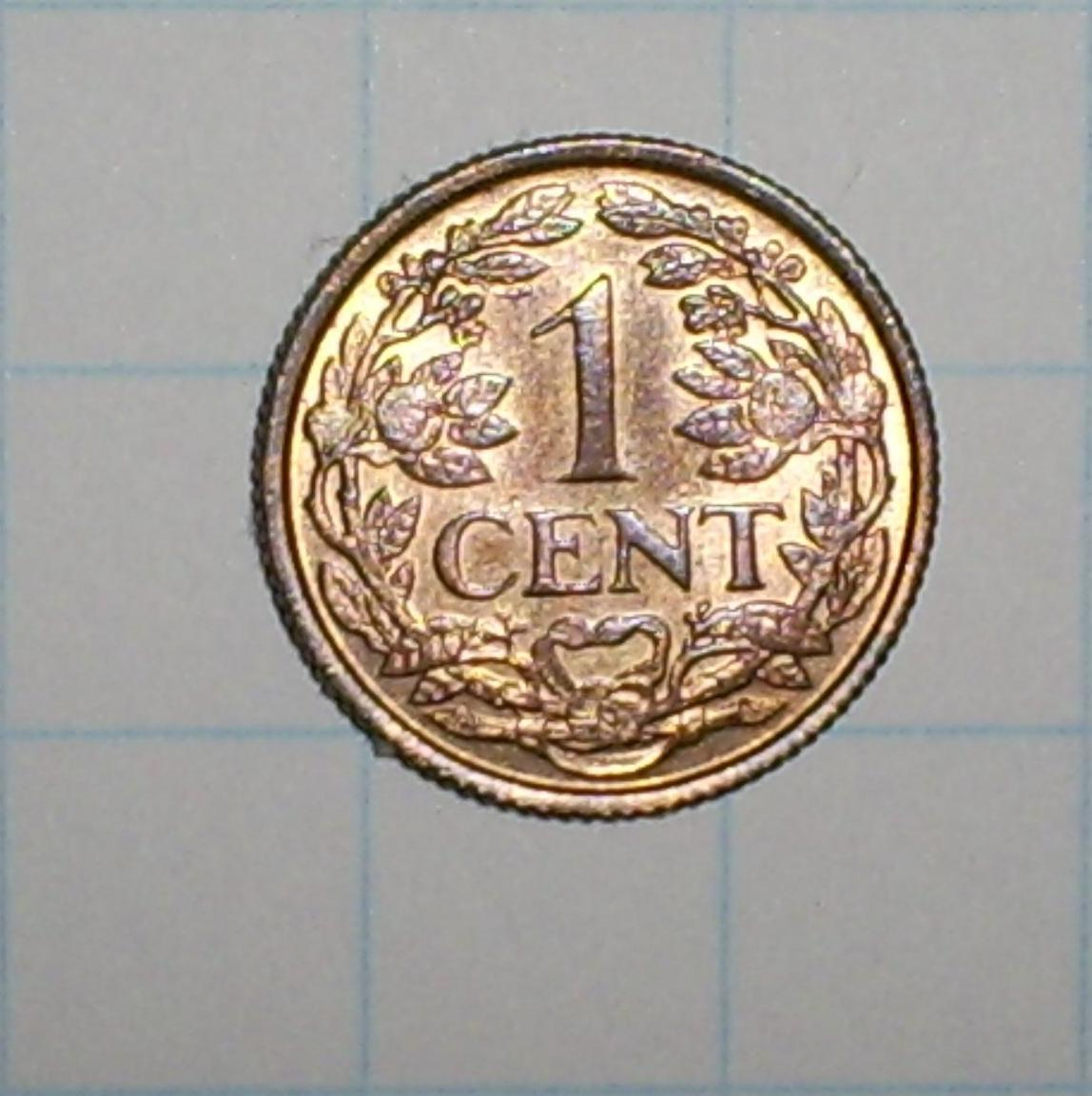
Obverse 1-cent 1941.

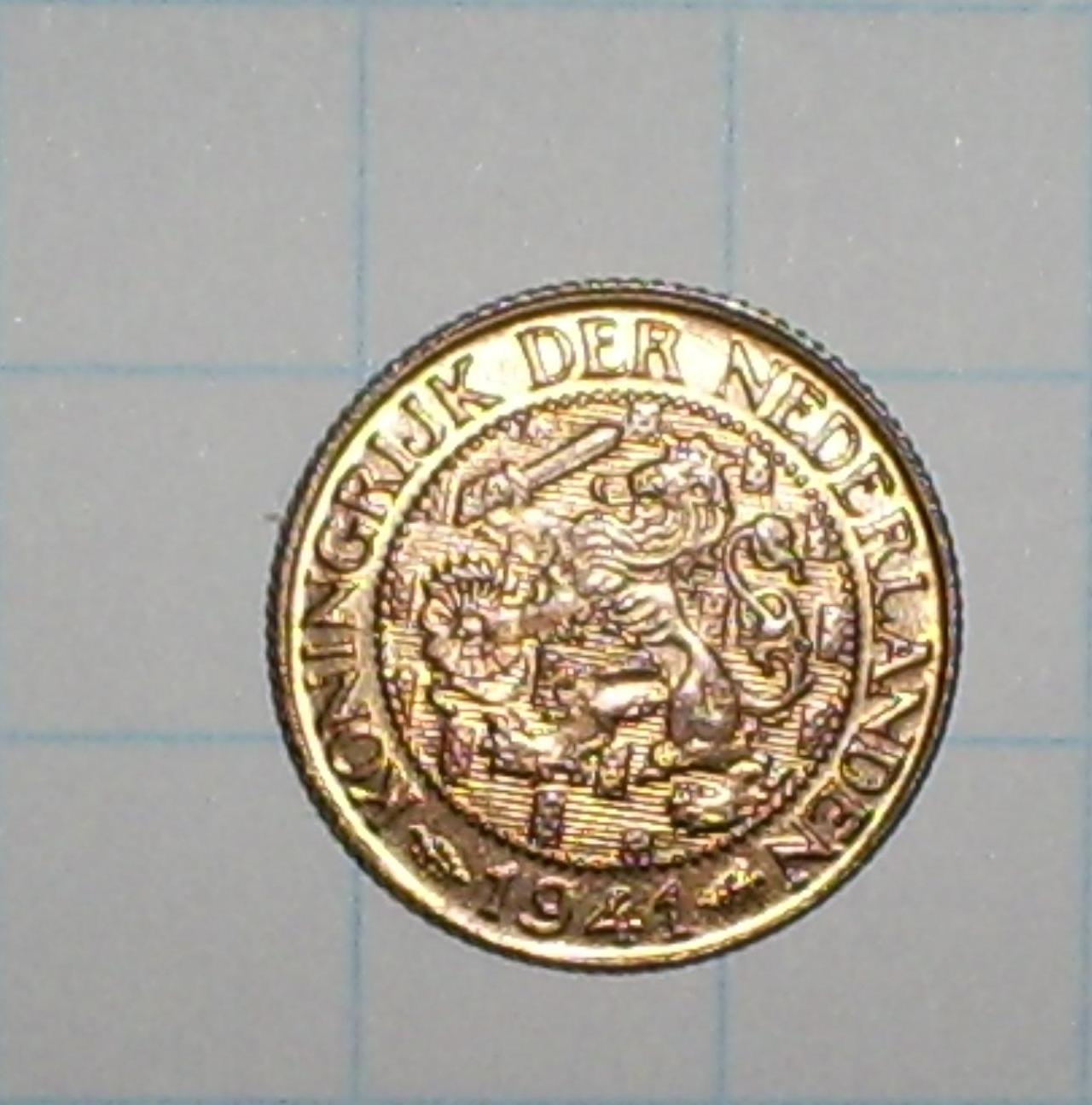
Reverse 1-cent 1941.

Obverse 1-cent 1943.

Reverse 1-cent 1943.
