= Banknotes of the Dutch guilder =

The chart below details the issues of Dutch guilder banknotes from 1950 to 2002, as well as the subjects featured. Printed and issued dates are included where the issued dates are in parentheses. If in the same year, only one number is shown.

The final date for exchange to Euros for each banknote is shown in square brackets/italics. A note showing [N/A] means it is no longer exchangeable for Euros; De Nederlandsche Bank generally exchanges banknotes for 30 years following their withdrawal from circulation.

Guilder banknotes, designs, and issues
| Period | 1 guilder | 2 1/2 guilder | 20 guilder | | | | | |
|---|---|---|---|---|---|---|---|---|
| 1950 - 1970 | Promissory note Queen Juliana [N/A] | Promissory note Queen Juliana [N/A] | Boerhaave [N/A] | | | | | |
| Period | 5 guilder | 10 guilder | 25 guilder | 50 guilder | 100 guilder | 250 guilder | 1000 guilder | Main theme |
| 1947 - 1950 | | William I / Mill by Ruijsdael [N/A] | Flora, King Solomon [N/A] | Adriaantje Hollaer [N/A] | | | | |
| 1950 - 1970 | Joost van den Vondel; 1966 [1 May 2025] | Hugo de Groot; 1953 (1954) [N/A] | Christiaan Huygens; 1955 (1956) [N/A] | | Desiderius Erasmus; 1953 (1954) [N/A] | | Rembrandt van Rijn; 1956 (1958) [N/A] | |
| 1971 - 1990 | Joost van den Vondel; 1973 (1976) [1 May 2025] | Frans Hals; 1968 (1971) [1 Jan 2032] | Jan Pieterszoon Sweelinck; 1971 (1972) [1 May 2025] | | Michiel de Ruyter; 1970 (1972) [N/A] | | Baruch de Spinoza; 1972 (1973) [1 Jan 2032] | Portrait and geometry |
| 1981 - 2002 | | | | Sunflower; 1982 [1 Jan 2032] | Snipe; 1977 (1981) [1 Jan 2032] | Lighthouse; 1985 (1986) [1 Jan 2032] | | Nature |
| 1990 - 2002 | | Kingfisher; 1997 [1 Jan 2032] | Robin; 1989 (1990) [1 Jan 2032] | | Little owl 1992 (1993) [1 Jan 2032] | | Northern lapwing 1994 (1996) [1 Jan 2032] | Abstract geometry |
