= Ten cent coin (Netherlands 1941–1943) =

Dutch coin

10 cents
- Netherlands
- Value: 10 Dutch cents
- Mass: 3.3 g
- Diameter: 22 mm
- Thickness: 1.5 mm
- Edge: Reeded
- Composition: 100% Zn
- Years of minting: 1941-1943

Obverse
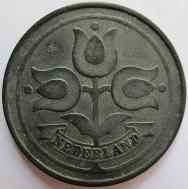
- Design: Three tulips flanked by dots within a circle. Lettering: NEDERLAND

Reverse
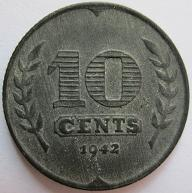
- Design: Denomination with sprigs. Lettering; 10 CENTS 1941

The zinc 10-cent coin was minted in the Netherlands between 1941 and 1943 during World War II. It was worth 1/10, or .10, of the guilder, and designed by Nico de Haas, a Dutch national-socialist. The respective mintage was of 29,800,000 (1941), 95,600,000 (1942), 29,000,000 (1943).

Preceded by Wilhelmina (4th portrait); 1926–1945	World War II 1941–1943	Succeeded by Wilhelmina (5th portrait); 1948
