= Twenty-five cent coin (Netherlands) =

Dutch coin

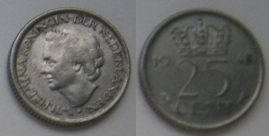
25 Cent, 1948

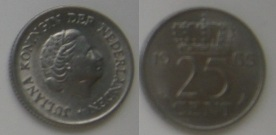
25 Cent, 1955

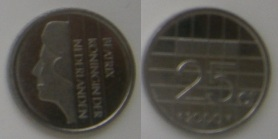
25 Cent, 2000

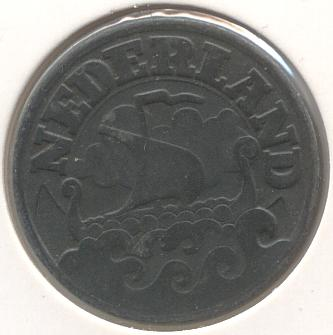
Obverse 25 cent, 1941.

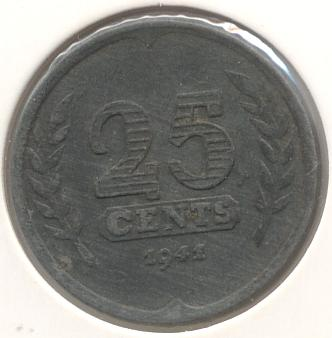
Reverse 25 cent, 1941.

The twenty-five cent was a coin worth a quarter of decimal Dutch guilder. It was used from the decimalisation of the currency in 1817 (equivalent to five stuivers in the pre-decimal system) until the Netherlands adopted the euro as sole currency in 2002. The last minting was in 2001. The coin was the third-smallest denomination of the guilder when the currency was withdrawn, and the largest of a value less than one guilder.

At first, the coin was minted with a layer of silver alloy. During the reign of King William III of the Netherlands the coin became smaller from 1877 onwards. The new size of the coin would be the final size, except during the German occupation of the Netherlands, when the coin was much bigger.

From 1948 onwards, the coin was minted using nickel. Its last design originated from 1980, with Queen Beatrix as the monarch on its obverse.

It was nicknamed the kwartje. The nickname came from the Dutch word for a quarter (kwart), and the diminutive suffix -je (similar to the English -ie).

== Dimensions and weight ==
	25 cent 1817-1830	25 cent 1848-1945	25 cent 1941-1943	25 cent 1948-2001
Gram	4.23 gram	3.58 gram	5 gram	3 gram
Diameter	21 mm	19 mm	26 mm	18.5 mm (1948); 19 mm (1950-2001)
Thickness	1.4 mm	1.44 mm (1898-1906); 1.38 mm (1910-1925)	1.5 mm	1.32 mm (1948); 1.61 mm (1950-1980); 1.55 mm (1982-2001)
Metal	Silver .569	Silver .640	Zinc	Nickel

== Versions during the kingdom of the Netherlands ==
Monarch	Mint	Material	Obverse	Reverse	Edge	Minting years
William I	Utrecht and Brussels	Silver	Crowned W between the mint year	Crowned Dutch coat of arms between value	Smooth with no edge lettering	1817-1819(U), 1822(U), 1823(B), 1824(B), 1825(U and B), 1826(U and B), 1827(B), 1828(B), 1829(U and B), 1830(U and B)
William II	Utrecht	Silver	Kings bust to the left	Value and mint year between two bonded oak branches	Reeded with no edge lettering	1848, 1849
William III	Utrecht	Silver	Kings bust to the right	Value and mint year between two bonded oak branches	Reeded with no edge lettering	1849, 1850, 1853, 1887, 1889, 1890
Wilhelmina	Utrecht	Silver	Queens bust to the left with loose hair	Value and mint year between two bonded oak branches	Reeded with no edge lettering	1891-1897
Wilhelmina	Utrecht	Silver	Queens head with diadem to the left	Value and mint year between two bonded oak branches	Reeded with no edge lettering	1898, 1901-1906
Wilhelmina	Utrecht	Silver	Queens bust with stoat cloak to the left	Value and mint year between two bonded oak branches	Reeded with no edge lettering	1910–1919, 1925
Wilhelmina	Utrecht and Philadelphia	Silver	Queens head to the left	Value and mint year between two bonded oak branches	Reeded with no edge lettering	1926(U), 1928(U), 1939(U), 1940(U), 1941(U and P), 1943-1945(P)
German occupation coin	Utrecht	Zinc	Stylized sailing ship	Value and mint year between two twigs	Smooth with no edge lettering	1941-1943
Wilhelmina	Utrecht	Nickel	Queens head to the left	Value and mint year under a crown	Reeded with no edge lettering	1948
Juliana	Utrecht	Nickel	Queens head to the right	Value and mint year under a crown	Reeded with no edge lettering	1950, 1951, 1954–1958, 1960–1980
Beatrix	Utrecht	Nickel	Half Queens head to the left	Value with interrupted rectangular planes	Reeded with no edge lettering	1982-2001
Discontinued due to introduction of the euro.
