= Nico de Haas =

Dutch artist (1907–1995)

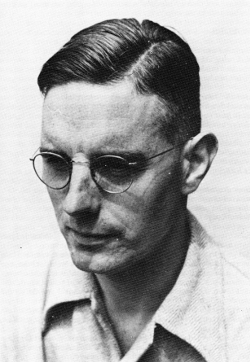
Nico de Haas (1942)

Nico de Haas (Amsterdam, 23 June 1907 – 1995) was a Dutch National-Socialist photographer, graphic designer, and artist.

In November of 1936, Haas joined the National Socialist (NSB) party as an editor for the editorial board of the party newspaper. When Germany invaded the Netherlands in 1940, he was promoted to editor in chief of De Vakbewwging. He was also the chief editor of the weekly magazine of the Nederlandsche SS, called Storm during two periods i.e. from April 1941 until December 1942 and from September 1944 until May 1945. He was also the designer for the coins and ration tokens that the Netherlands released during the war.

Because of his position in the NSB, De Haas was wanted for arrest after the war. Once he was arrested, De Haas managed to escape. He fled to Germany, before signing up for a French legion where he worked as a photographer. He was sent to French colonies such as Algeria and Vietnam. After this, he returned to Europe under a fake name. He died in 1995.

== See also ==
- 1 cent WWII (Dutch coin)
- 10 cents (World War II Dutch coin)
- 25 cents (World War II Dutch coin)
