= Stuiver =

Historical Dutch coin

- Netherlands
- Value: 0.05 Dutch guilder
- Mass: 3.5 g
- Diameter: 21 mm
- Thickness: 1.45 mm
- Edge: plain
- Orientation: coin
- Composition: 95% Cu, 4% Sn, 1% Zn
- Years of minting: 1948–2001 (Utrecht)
- Circulation: 1948– 28 January 2002; Redeemed by national bank until 1 January 2007
- Catalog number: -

Obverse
- Design: Queen Wilhelmina (1948); Queen Juliana (1950–1980); Queen Beatrix (1982–2001)
- Designer: L. O. Wenckebach (1948–1980); Bruno Ninaber van Eyben (1982–2001)

Reverse
- Design: Face value, year, privy mark (left), mint mark (right)
- Designer: L. O. Wenckebach (1948–1980); Bruno Ninaber van Eyben (1982–2001)

The stuiver [ˈstœyvər] was a coin used in the Netherlands, worth 1/20 of a guilder (16 penning or 8 duit, later 5 cents). It was also minted on the Lower Rhine region and the Dutch colonies. The word can still refer to the 5 euro cent coin, which has almost exactly the same diameter and colour despite being over twice the value of the older coin.

== Netherlands ==
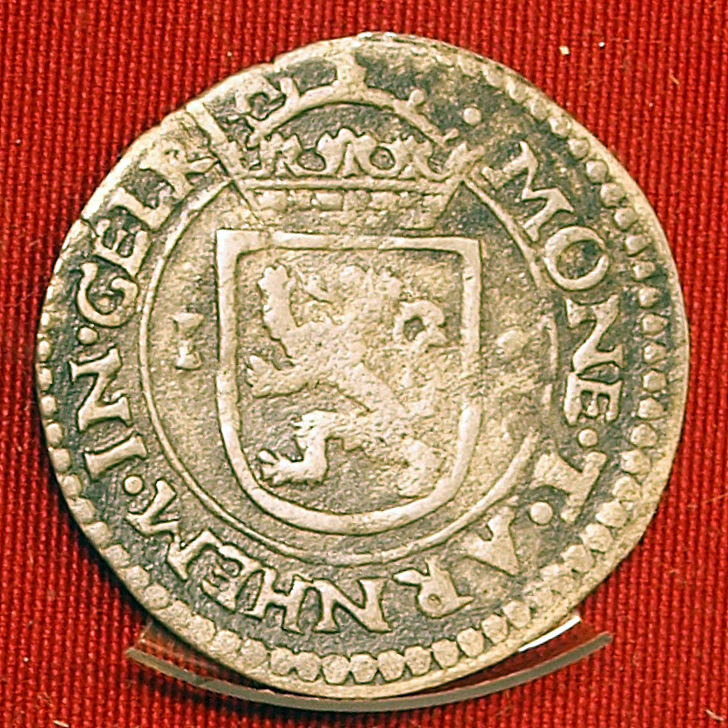
An Arnhem stuiver of 1598.

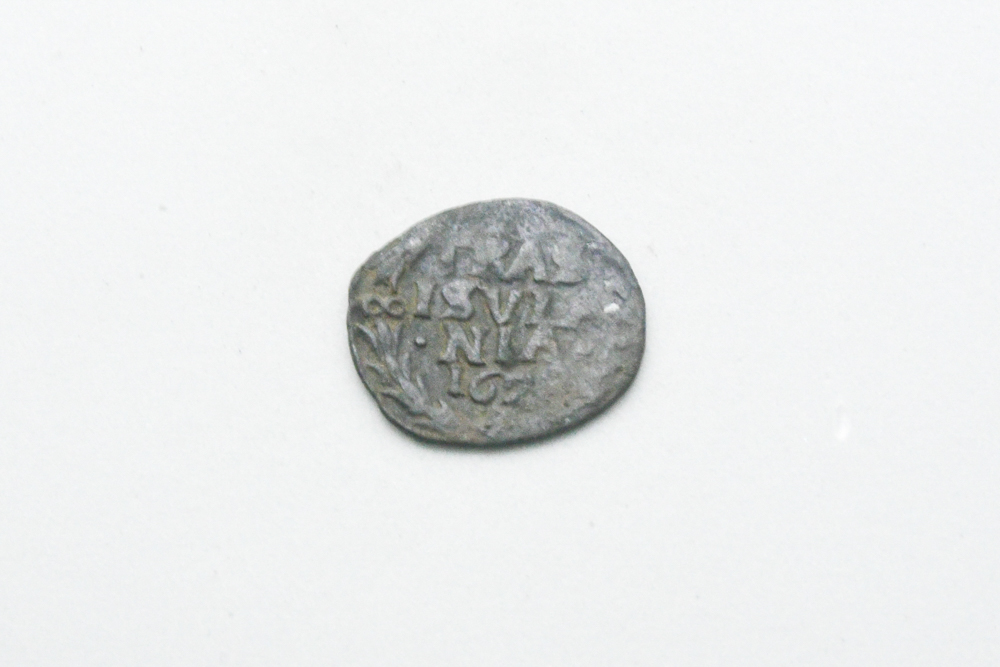
Stuiver silver coin of Overijssel province (lat. Transisulania), 1628.

The Stüber emerged from the vierlander ("coin of four provinces"), that Philip III of Burgundy had minted from 1434 as a common denomination for Brabant, Flanders, Holland and the Hainault (Hennegau) and which had a value of 1/20 Rhenish gulden. It corresponded to 3 Brabant Plakken, 2 Flemish Groten, 16 Dutch pfennigs or 1 Artesian schilling. The name "stuiver" derives from the Dutch stuiven ("flying sparks"), since on early Flemish stuivers "spark-producing flints of the Collar of the Golden Fleece" were depicted. Twenty stuivers equalled a Dutch Guilder. It circulated until the Napoleonic Wars. In 1818 the Netherlands decimalised its guilder into 100 cents. Two stuivers equalled a dubbeltje - the ten-cent coin. After the decimalisation of Dutch currency, the name "stuiver" was preserved as a nickname for the five-cent coin until the introduction of the euro in 2002. The word can still refer to the 5 euro cent coin, which has almost exactly the same diameter and colour despite being over twice the value of the older coin.

== Holy Roman Empire ==
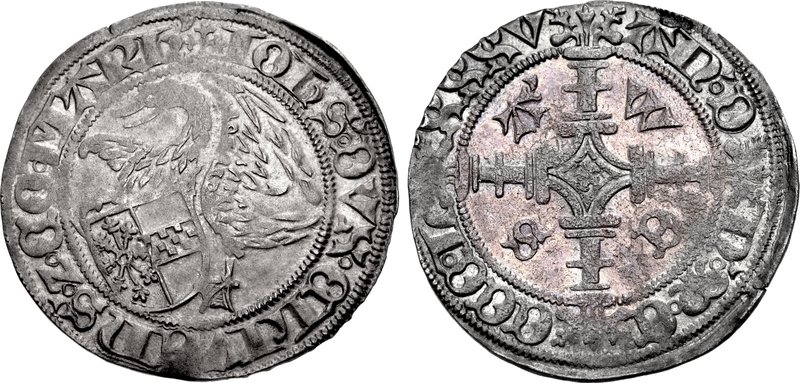
Schwanenstüber, 1485, Duchy of Cleves

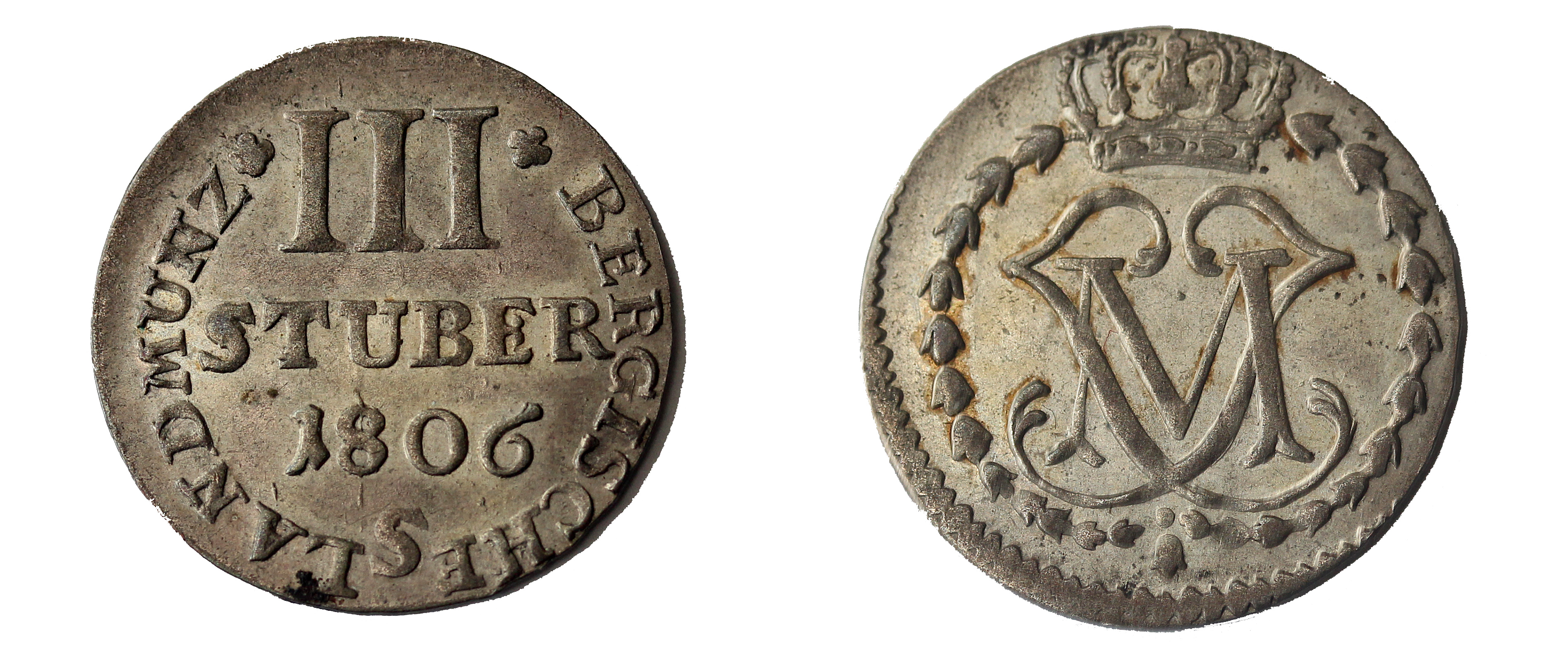
3 Stüber, Duchy of Berg, 1806

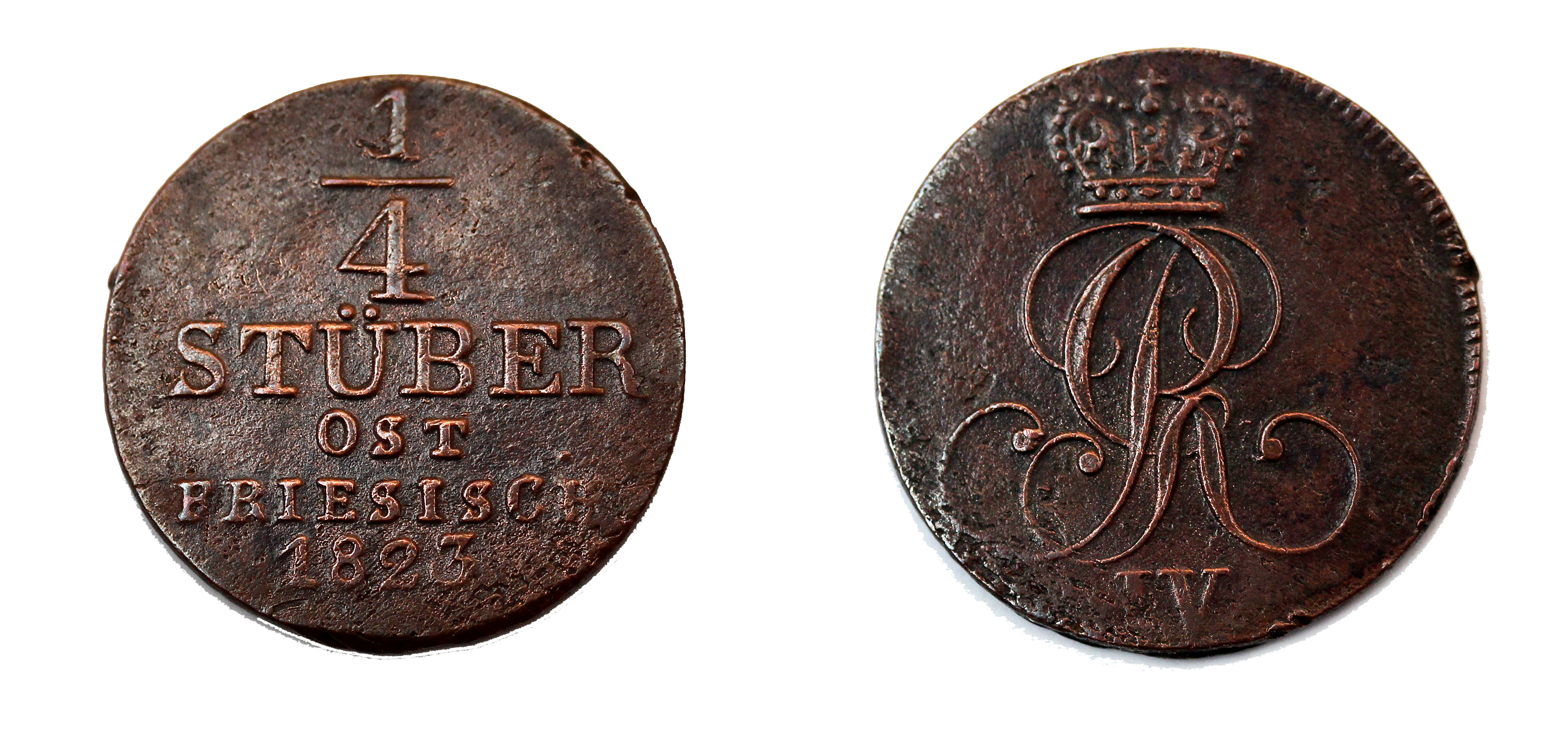
1/4 Stüber, Hanover for East Frisia, 1823

The Stüber (abbreviation: stbr.) or Stüver was a small groschen coin that was minted in north-west Germany, especially in the territories of today's North Rhine-Westphalia and in the County of East Frisia roughly from the end of the 15th century to the early 19th century.

On the Lower Rhine, these coins mostly had a value of 1 1/3 albus or 16 hellers, in Cleves, 21 hellers. One Rechnungstaler corresponded to 60 Stüber.

== European colonies ==
From 1660, the Dutch East India Company (VOC) began to strike copper stuiver coins for local use in Dutch Ceylon. At first, the coins were simply stamped on both sides with their denomination but from 1783, the VOC monogram and date were added. The coins were minted at Colombo, Jaffna, Galle and Trincomalee. These coins were issued till British occupation in 1796. The stiver (Sinhala: තුට්ටුව) was a currency denomination (1/48 Ceylonese rixdollar) in use across the 18th and 19th century Sri Lanka and Caribbean, especially among the Dutch, Danish, and Swedish islands. It was also a denomination that formed part of the currency system of Demerara-Essequibo (later British Guiana, now Guyana). In the British colonies, a stiver had a value of twopence. The currency was also mentioned in the famous poem by Robert Browning, The Pied Piper of Hamelin: "With you, don't think I'll bate [abate, reduce my demands by] a stiver! And folks who put me in a passion may find me pipe after another fashion."

== Austria ==
The name Stüber was also considered for a coin that would have been a sub-division of the Austrian schilling introduced in 1924; In the end, however, the name Groschen was chosen.

== Literature ==
- Heinz Fengler, Gerhard Gierow, Willy Unger: Numismatik. Berlin 1988.
- Helmut Kahnt: Das große Münzlexikon von A bis Z. Regenstauf 2005.
- Hans Spaeth: Der Münzfund von Kirchhellen. Ein Beitrag zur Systematik des Emmericher Stüber. Kreß & Hornung, Munich, 1941.

== See also ==
- 5 Cent WWII (Dutch coin)
- 5 Cent 1948 (Dutch coin)
