= 25 cents (World War II Dutch coin) =

- Netherlands
- Value: 25 Dutch cents
- Mass: 5 g
- Diameter: 26 mm
- Thickness: 1.5 mm
- Edge: Plain
- Composition: 100% Zn
- Years of minting: 1941–1943

Obverse
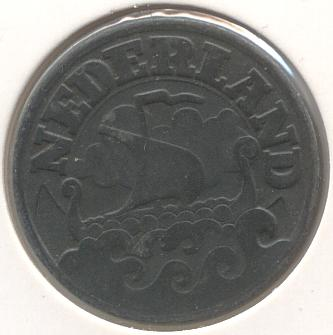
- Design: Saling ship with waves. Lettering: NEDERLAND

Reverse
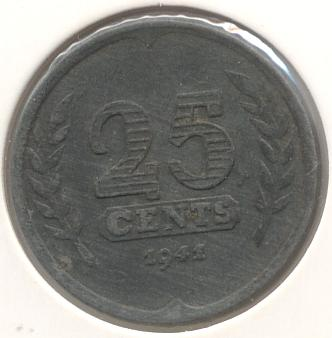
- Design: Denomination with sprigs. Lettering; 25 CENTS 1941

The 25-cent piece was the highest-denomination coin minted in the Netherlands during World War II. Struck between 1941 and 1943, the 25-cent coin was worth 1/4, or 0.25, of a Dutch guilder. It was made entirely of zinc, and designed by Nico de Haas, a Dutch national-socialist. The respective mintage was of 34,600,000 (1941), (1942), 13,600,000 (1943).
