= Ootje Oxenaar =

Dutch graphic designer (1929–2017)

- Born: Robert Deodaat Emile Oxenaar; 7 October 1929; The Hague, Netherlands
- Died: 13 June 2017 (aged 87); Manomet, Massachusetts, U.S.
- Education: Royal Academy of Art (The Hague)
- Known for: Visual Artist, Graphic Designer, Banknote Designer, Art and Design Commissioner, Professor

Robert Deodaat Emile "Ootje" Oxenaar (7 October 1929 – 13 June 2017) was a Dutch graphic artist, visual artist, commissioner, and professor.

== Biography ==
Oxenaar was a student at the Royal Academy of Art, The Hague and graduated in 1953 with honours. He later was a lecturer at the Royal Academy of Fine Arts in The Hague between 1958 and 1970 and taught as Professor of Visual Communication at the Delft University of Technology between 1978 and 1992.

As Head of the Art and Design advisory bureau (DEV/K+V) at the Dutch Postal and Telecommunications (PTT / KPN) from 1976 to 1994, he was responsible for the commissioning of art and design for the largest Dutch public concern, and served as aesthetic advisor to the Dutch National Bank, the Ministry of Justice in the Netherlands and the Danish Ministry of Transport. His influence on the next generation of designers was extensive as a commissioner, teacher, and international lecturer, in the Netherlands, Europe, and the US.

From 1964 to 1987, Oxenaar was commissioned for two series of banknotes by The Nederlandsche Bank (DNB) and was responsible for the revolutionary design of the 'Snip' (100), the Sunflower (50) and Lighthouse (250) banknotes which were internationally celebrated as the most beautiful and least counterfeited money in the world. His banknotes stayed in circulation from 1964 until being replaced by the Euro in 2002.

R.D.E. Oxenaar was also a prolific designer of acclaimed posters, books, and postage stamps. His graphic design work is represented in various collections, including Centre Georges-Pompidou in Paris, Gemeentemuseum Den Haag, Museum of Modern Art (MoMA) and Stedelijk Museum Amsterdam. Oxenaar's work is preserved in the Nederlands Archief Grafisch Ontwerpers, Utrecht (NAGO).

Oxenaar was member of the Alliance Graphique International (AGI) and an honorary member of the Association of Dutch Designers (BNO).

In 2000 Oxenaar emigrated to the United States where he continued his studio practice and taught in the Graphic Design Department at Rhode Island School of Design (RISD), Providence.

Oxenaar was knighted in the Order of Orange Nassau, and the recipient of the Medal of Honour for Art and Science in the House Order of Orange bestowed by Queen Beatrix in 2004.

Oxenaar was married to Dawn Barrett, designer and former Dean of Architecture and Design at Rhode Island School of Design, and President of Massachusetts College of Art and Design. Together they had two children.

== List of banknotes by Ootje Oxenaar ==
Banknotes of Ootje Oxenaar
Pick No.	Value	Dimensions	Main Colour	Main motif	Watermark	Date of issue	Date of circulation	Date of withdrawal
90	ƒ5	76 × 136 mm	Green	Joost van den Vondel		26 April 1966	19 December 1966	1 May 1995
91	ƒ10	76 × 142 mm	Blue	Frans Hals	Cornucopia	25 April 1968	4 January 1971	28 January 2002
92	ƒ25	76 × 148 mm	Red	Jan Pieterszoon Sweelinck	Waves	10 February 1971	15 December 1972	1 May 1995
93	ƒ100	76 × 154 mm	Brown	Michiel de Ruyter		14 May 1970	15 December 1972	23 July 1986
94	ƒ1 000	76 × 160 mm	Dark Green	Baruch Spinoza	Pyramid on bowl and slab	30 March 1972	15 January 1973	28 January 2002
95	ƒ5	76 × 136 mm	Green	Joost van den Vondel	Inwell, quill pen and scroll	28 March 1973	14 June 1976	1 May 1995
96	ƒ50	76 × 148 mm	Orange	Sunflower	Bee	4 January 1982	7 September 1982	28 January 2002
97	ƒ100	76 × 154 mm	Brown	Common snipe and Great snipe	Great snipe	28 July 1977	16 March 1981	28 January 2002
98	ƒ250	76 × 160 mm	Purple	Lighthouse	Rabbit	25 July 1985	7 January 1986	28 January 2002

== Bibliography ==
- Kuijpers, Els (2011). Ootje Oxenaar: designer and commissioner (English ed.). Rotterdam: 010 Publishers. ISBN 978-90-6450-720-5.
