= 5 cents (World War II Dutch coin) =

Coin minted during the German occupation of the Netherlands

- Netherlands
- Value: 5 Dutch cents
- Mass: 2.6 g
- Diameter: 18 mm
- Edge: Plain
- Composition: 100% Zn
- Years of minting: 1941-1943

Obverse
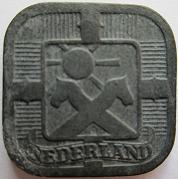
- Design: Two Saksan horseheads under a shining sun, in a square. Lettering: NEDERLAND

Reverse
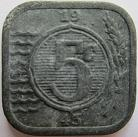
- Design: Denomination, nine waves, and grain. Lettering; 5c 1941

The zinc 5-cent coin was minted in the Netherlands between 1941 and 1943 during World War II. It was worth 1/20, or .05, of the guilder, and designed by Nico de Haas, a Dutch national-socialist.

== Mintage ==
The following table lists the number of coins minted:

Year	Mintage
1941	32,200,000
1942	11,800,000
1943	7,000,000

Preceded by Square stuiver 1913–1941	World War II 1941–1943	Succeeded by Wilhelmina; 5th portrait 1948
