= Bruno Ninaber van Eyben =

Dutch jewellery and industrial designer (born 1950)

- Born: 3 November 1950 (age 75); Boxtel, Netherlands
- Occupation: Industrial designer
- Website: www.ninaber.nl

Bruno Ninaber van Eyben (born 3 November 1950) is a Dutch jewellery and industrial designer. He designed the last series of Dutch guilder coins and the obverse side of all circulating Dutch euro coins.

== Personal life ==
Bruno Ninaber van Eyben was born on 3 November 1950 in Boxtel in the Netherlands. He currently lives in Delft.

== Designer ==
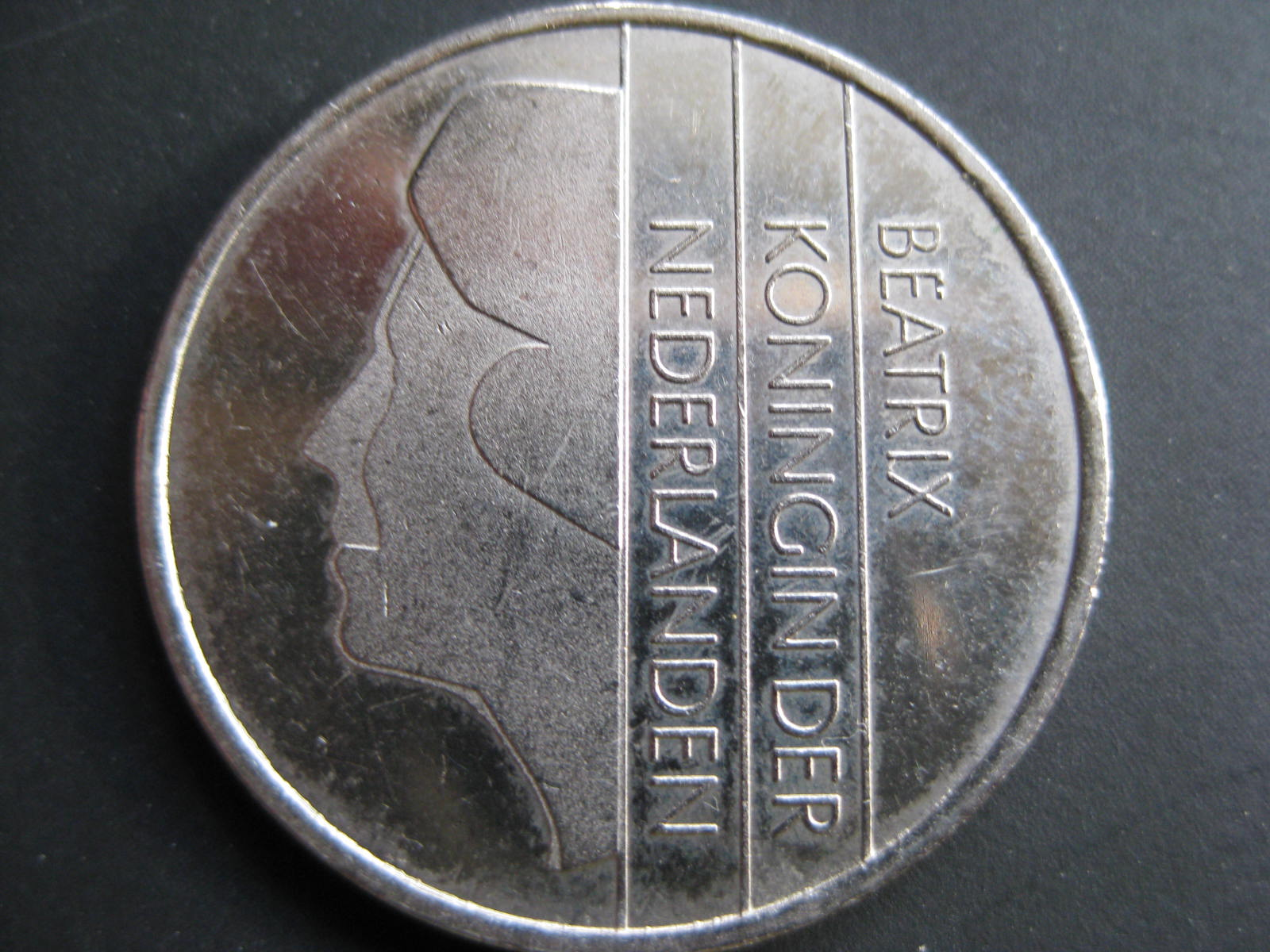
The obverse side of the Dutch guilder, designed by Bruno Ninaber van Eyben, shows Queen Beatrix

In 1971, Bruno Ninaber van Eyben graduated cum laude from the College of Art in Maastricht as a jewellery designer. In the 1970s, he designed a bracelet watch (1973), a pendant watch (1976), and a fluorescent lighting system (1977). In 1979, he received the Kho Liang Ie Award, a Dutch award for industrial design.

In 1980, he designed the last series of Dutch guilder coins, which were in circulation from 1982 until the introduction of the euro in 2002. In 1997, he started his own studio called Bruno Ninaber van Eyben design+production in Delft. In May 1998, he won the contest for the design of the reverse side of the Dutch euro coins.

Since 2003, he has been a professor of Design at the Delft University of Technology.
