= Privy mark =

Identifying mark on coinage

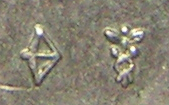
Privy mark (left) of drs. Chr. van Draanen and mint mark on a Dutch coin.

A privy mark was originally a small mark or differentiation in the design of a coin for the purpose of identifying the mint, moneyer, some other aspect of the coin's origin, or to prevent counterfeiting. The origin of the term privy marks is an old French word "prive," which was derived from the Latin word "privatus" meaning set apart or private. [They are] typically used to commemorate a special event, anniversary or to add a layer of security. These marks can vary in design and are often placed in a discrete part of the coin, such as next to the date or mintmark.

One of the first instances of a privy mark used as a counterfeit measure was during the 17th century in a plan proposed by Sir Edward Ford to mint farthings, halfpence and three-farthings.

The main distinction between a privy mark and a mint mark lies in their purposes. Unlike a mint mark, which indicates the coin's place or source of minting, a privy mark may also indicate where a coin was minted and serves as a design and marketing element to honor a significant occasion or denote its inclusion in a specific collection. Some privy marked coins—such as the Canadian Silver Privy Marked Maple Leaf—may sell at a premium.

== See also ==
- Mint mark
