= Rixdollar =

Dutch colonial empire currency, also other European silver currency

Rixdollar is the English term for silver coinage used throughout the European continent (German: Reichsthaler, Dutch: rijksdaalder, Danish: rigsdaler, Swedish: riksdaler, French: risdale).

The same term was also used of currency in Cape Colony and Ceylon. However, the Rixdollar only existed as a coin in Ceylon. Unissued remainder banknotes for the Cape of Good Hope denominated in Rixdollars exist, but these are very rare. Rixdollars were used throughout 17th century America in most Dutch colonies.
