= Netherlands Indies guilder =

Unit of account of the Dutch East Indies

Nederlands-Indische gulden (Dutch); Roepiah Hindia-Belanda (Malay); fl.
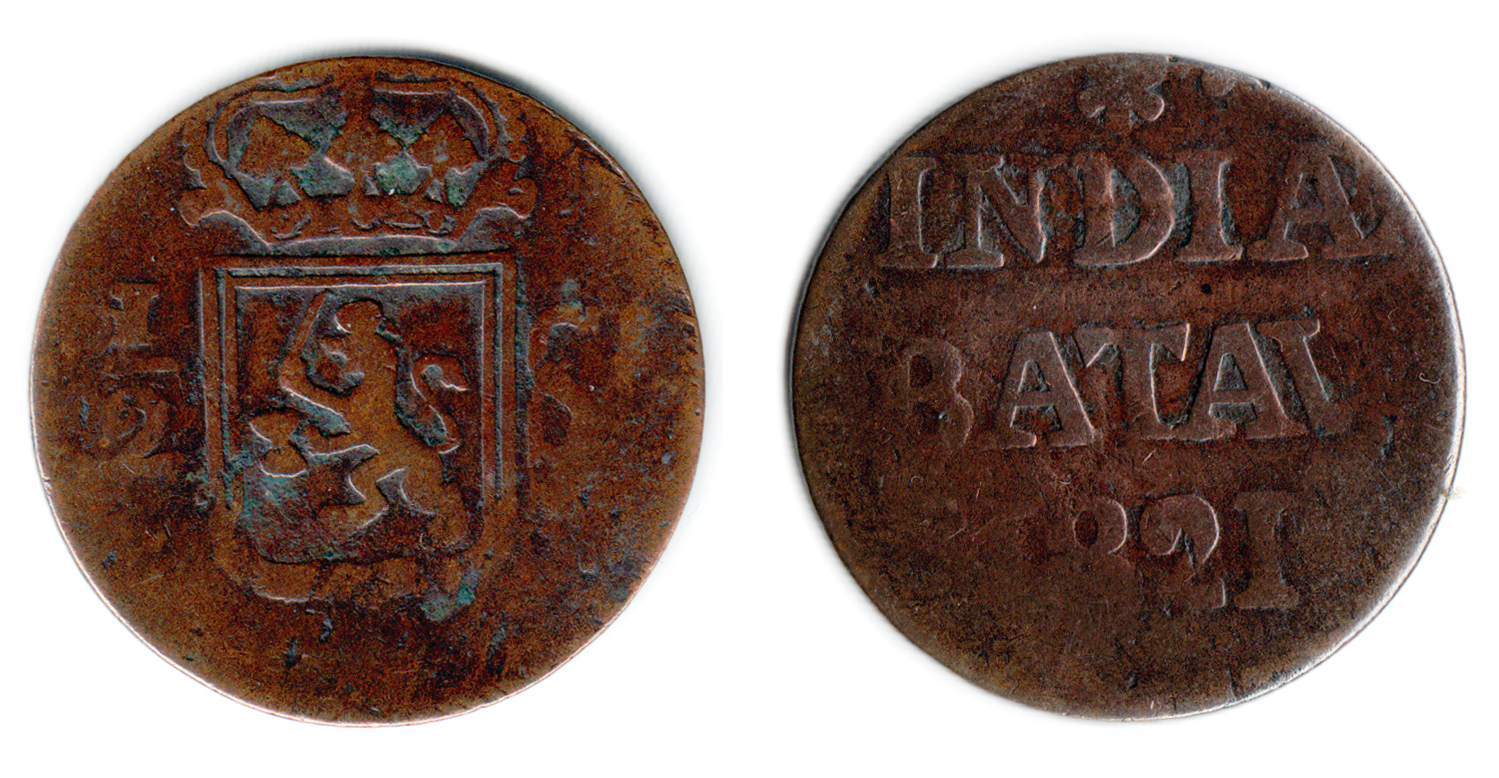
1821 Indiae Batav 1/2 stuiver
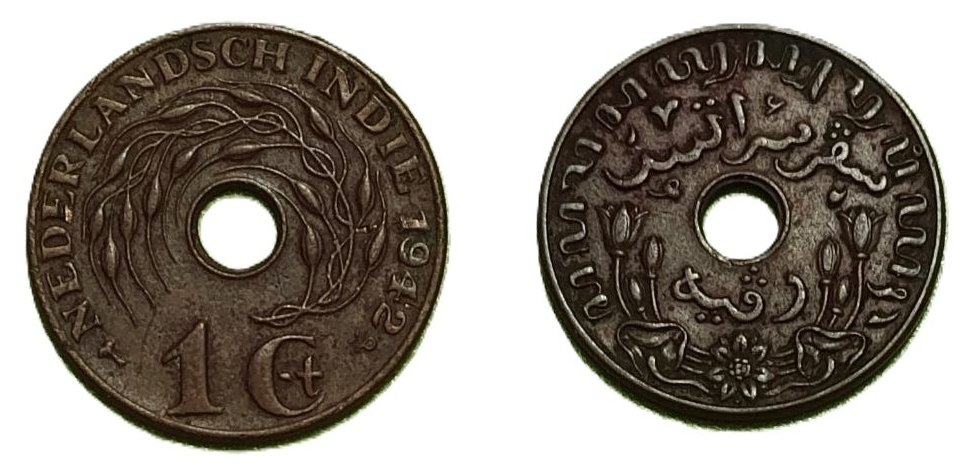
1942 Nederlandsch Indie 1 cent

Units of account
- Base unit: guilder
- Plural: guilders
- Symbol: ƒ
- Subunit
- 1/100: cent
- Plural
- cent: cents
- Symbol
- cent: c

Denominations
- Banknotes
- Freq. used: ƒ1/2 , ƒ1 , ƒ2 1/2 , ƒ5, ƒ10, ƒ25, ƒ50, ƒ100
- Coins
- Freq. used: 1/2c, 1c, 2 1/2c, 1/10ƒ, 1/4ƒ

Demographics
- Date of introduction: 1602
- Replaced by: Netherlands Indies roepiah (1942); Indonesian rupiah (1953)
- User(s): Netherlands Indies

Issuance
- Central bank: Dutch government De Javasche Bank
- This infobox shows the latest status before this currency was rendered obsolete.

The Netherlands Indies guilder (Dutch: Nederlands-Indische gulden, Malay-Van Ophuijsen spelling: Roepiah Hindia-Belanda) was the unit of account of the Dutch East Indies from 1602 under the United East India Company (Dutch: Vereenigde Oost-Indische Compagnie; VOC), following Dutch practice first adopted in the 15th century (guilder coins were not minted in the Netherlands between 1558 and 1681 and none circulated in the Indies until a century later). A variety of Dutch, Spanish and Asian coins were in official and common usage. After the collapse of the VOC at the end of the 18th century, control of the islands reverted to the Dutch government, which issued silver 'Netherlands Indies' guilder and fractional silver and copper coins until Indonesian independence in 1945.

== History ==
=== Prior to European contact ===
A number of forms of payment were found throughout the archipelago prior to European contact.

Stamped gold and silver masa and kupang date from the 9th century, with later coins substantially debased, with 13th-century silver masa containing only copper, while gold coins were very light. It is possible that this reflected a move towards the use of lower value coins for every day transactions.

The rise of the Majapahit empire from the 13th century saw the masa disappear from use, replaced with the 'picis', or copper Chinese cash in the 14th century, which had been produced in vast numbers in China, and were kept in strings of 100 or 1000 coins. 14th century documentation shows the cash coins in widespread use, which spread to nearby islands including Sumatra (although not the Islamic Aceh, which minted its own Arabic gold mas coins).

Trade with China was banned by China for substantial portions of the next two centuries, and so lighter copies were made by local Chinese merchants (out of locally available lead or tin rather than the more desirable copper, which needed to come from China). In the Islamic Sultanate of Palembang, these coins eventually (from the 17th century) became the 'pitis', a holed coin with Arabic writing.

=== 16th century ===
European trade with the Indies began in the 16th century, with the Spanish eight real coin, or Spanish Dollar, the predominant world trade coin, used in Portuguese expeditions to the East to bring valuable spices back to Europe. Chinese and other Asian traders were also using silver coins including the Indian Rupee and Eight Real.

The low-valued picis had wildly fluctuating value, but were worth around 10,000 lead picis to the piece of eight around the turn of the 17th century. Due to lack of supply of the genuine Chinese copper picis, they were worth six times as much as the lead coin by this time.

=== 17th century—United East India Company take control ===
Trade companies in two provinces of the Netherlands began trading expeditions to the Indies in the late 16th century, and were authorised to issue their own trade coins for use on these expeditions: the United Amsterdam Company in 1601 and the Middelburg Company in 1602. Each issued 8 Real coins, while the United Amsterdam Company also issued 4, 2, 1, 1/2 and 1/4 Real coins.

The 1601 coin was the first trade dollar issued by any European power in the East, but the unfamiliar coins were rejected in favour of the well-known 8 Real coins produced by Spain and its possessions, which were accepted all over the world. The Spanish coins remained the preferred large silver (trade) coin in the Indies until the 19th century.

In 1602, the United East India Company (VOC) was formed from six trading companies in the Netherlands, and granted a trade monopoly over the Indies. In 1619 the company established its capital at Jakarta, which it called Batavia. It gradually spread its influence over Java, and established control over Sumatra in 1667 by treaty.

The company's directors, sitting in Amsterdam, adopted a unit of account system, based on a notional guilder, divided into 20 notional stuivers. This followed Dutch practice, and reflected the tendency for coins to get debased over time, and hence the nominal value of a given weight of silver to increase. The rijksdaalder, with 25.7 g actual silver weight, was declared the Dutch national coin in 1606, and valued at 47 stuivers, a rate increased to 48 stuivers in 1608. The stuiver and two stuiver coins had a slightly lower silver weight than implied by this conversion rate, reflecting their utility as small change. The weight of silver equal to one guilder unit was derived from the value in stuivers of the weight of the rijksdaalder coin. This accounting practice correctly reflected inflation over time. However the VOC's accounting guilder of 20 stuivers was fixed at the 1608 valuation of the 25.7g rijksdaalder at 48 stuiver.

In practice, the rijksdaalder proved less desirable than the better-known Spanish 8 Real coin, and as the rijksdaalder contained more silver, they disappeared from circulation according to Gresham's law. As a result, the VOC shipped the Spanish coin in large quantities, and it was the standard large coin of the Indies, used in official transactions, and given the same 48 stuiver value as the rijksdaalder.

Small change intended for local use did not need to be accepted outside the Indies, so Dutch silver 1 stuiver, 2 stuiver (dubbeltjes, known as 'uang'), and 6 stuiver (schillings) coins were imported. The less valuable lead picis cash coins continued to circulate. The materials for these were supplied by the Dutch. However they had no official exchange value. With 411 tons of lead supplied between 1633 and 1640, at least a billion coins were produced in that period alone (weighing only 0.7 g each, against the 3.5 g of copper in the original Chinese cash). Due to oversupply, their production then became unprofitable, but resumed later. These coins remained in demand until the mid-18th century, and production only ended in 1763.

VOC officials discovered that large silver coins were being removed from circulation and exported, something they believed reflected a higher (by about 20%) price for silver in Asia. As a result, in 1640 the rijksdaalder (valued at 50 stuivers in the Netherlands) and the Spanish 8 Real were both increased in value to 60 stuiver coins, thereby making it unprofitable to exchange small change for large coins.

In 1644 the VOC instructed a Chinese resident of Batavia named Conjok to mint copper coinage in denominations of a half and quarter stuiver to address the shortage of low denomination money. The VOC administrators in the Netherlands ordered this minting to cease after only five weeks, so not many coins were minted. The first VOC silver coins were issued in 1645 by Dutch goldsmith Jan Ferman along with Conjok, in denominations of 48, 24 and 12 stuivers, otherwise known as the Batavian Crown, Half and Quarter Crown. These were made from Japanese silver bars as an emergency measure to address the lack of large silver coins due to the locals selling the large Dutch silver coins to Chinese traders for a profit. The Crown weighed 7/8 of a Dutch lion thaler, which was then worth 48 stuivers. Due to counterfeiting, the coins were withdrawn two years later, in 1647. These coins, the first to bear the VOC monogram, and the last until 1724, are now very scarce.

The Directors of the VOC in Amsterdam disapproved of the increased valuation of the rijksdaalder and 8 Real coins, and it was ended in 1651. The Batavian administrators continued to argue for it, and in 1655 the 25% devaluation was restored. However Amsterdam ordered that the small coins be devalued by 25%, and large coins by 20% (in relation to the Netherlands, where the 8 Real was worth 50 stuivers). In the Indies the Dutch stuiver coin was thus worth 1.25 stuiver, and the rijksdaalder and Eight Real 60 stuiver.

To subdivide the Indies stuiver, in 1658 an official issue of the lari known as Tangs—'fish hook' coins made of copper (based on money in use in South Asia)—was attempted. A tang was equal to a quarter 'Indies stuiver', with five equalling the Dutch stuiver coin. The tang were to be officially stamped to prevent clipping, but this was unsuccessful as the copper proved too hard to work. A revised order authorising production in pewter followed in 1660. As only one specimen is known to survive, it seems that this was not a successful issue.

Batavian officials in 1658 restored the ratio of 60:1 between stuiver coin and the Eight Real coin, introducing the concept of 'light' and 'heavy' stuiver. The Eight Real was worth sixty 'heavy stuivers' and the stuiver coin one 'heavy stuiver', while in 'light' stuivers, things were valued 25% higher, so a stuiver coin was worth 1.25 'light' stuivers, and the rijksdaalder was worth 75 'light' stuivers.

These concepts were essentially a misdirection of the Amsterdam administration designed to enable the Batavian officials to make private profits at the VOC's expense. VOC officials manipulated the system, paying 'light' money in Batavia and receiving heavy in Amsterdam, at the expense of the VOC. The system caused great confusion, but 'light' money was not abolished until 1742 locally, and in 1766 in the VOC accounts.

With thirty 2-stuiver coins containing more silver than an 8 Real, the two-stuiver coins soon disappeared from circulation, for melting at a profit.

In addition to the 8 Real, a number of other large coins were in use. These included the Dutch silver ducat (which replaced the rijksdaalder from 1659, and contained slightly less silver than the 8 Real, though it was valued the same), the Dutch lion thaler and cross thaler and the ducaton. Gold coinage included the Dutch gold ducat, as well as the Japanese koban gold plaque and ichi-bu gold coin—all of which were at various times in the late 17th century subject to countermarking, a measure designed to keep genuine, high-quality coins in use, but which were all ended as the countermarks could also be falsified.

In the last decade of the 17th century, the Indian silver rupee was introduced to the Indies by the Dutch, who initially (from 1693) counterstamped the coins, and valued them at 30 stuivers, an excessive value given the silver weight of only 11.44 g, and led to large numbers of rupees being imported. Other late 17th century countermarking efforts included a 1686 initiative to counterstamp imported ducatons (which were thereby given greater value), rijksdaalders and half ducatons. This measure ended in 1692. Another counterstamping measure was of the silver stuiver coins of Zeeland, which were counterstamped from 1687 for a number of years.

=== 1724—introduction of the duit ===
The VOC wished to introduce copper coinage, replacing the picis (the supply of which had been interrupted by the Japanese), and began to import Dutch duit in 1724 from the province of Holland. These were valued at 4 duit to the heavy stuiver (i.e. the Dutch stuiver coin), twice the value that they had in the Netherlands. This created an obvious arbitrage opportunity, and the coins were withdrawn in 1725.

Although two of the Dutch provinces had granted their VOC Companies permission to mint coins in the name of Batavia in 1624, the Dutch Parliament withheld its assent to this, and no such VOC coinage was issued until 1726, when there were two different classes of duits: those circulating in the Netherlands, valued at 1/8 stuiver, and those circulating in the Indies at 1/4 stuiver. By declaring that only duits bearing the 'VOC' monogram would be legal tender in the Indies, the VOC could keep its (clearly highly profitable) monopoly on these coins, though the high value of duits relative to their intrinsic worth did mean that duit forgeries were common in the Indies.

Holland and Zeeland issued the first VOC copper duit coins, bearing their respective arms, and those two provinces along with West Friesland also issued VOC ducatons (one ounce silver coins). The Dutch Parliament objected to the ducatons, arguing that the designs were unapproved, and threatened a fine of 1,000 ducatons per ducaton issued. The provinces backed down, and all specimens were melted down.

A new design for VOC ducatons was then submitted and assent given, with the first VOC ducatons issued in 1728 by, and bearing the arms of, each of the six provinces that constituted the companies of the VOC.

VOC ducatons were minted in many of the years between 1728 and 1751 by one or more of these six provinces. Several million coins were minted in total. Far more VOC duits were minted than that. As with the ducaton, they were modelled on the Dutch duits that were the first to be shipped to the Indies, but unlike the 1726 ducatons, they were not recalled, and thus the first VOC duits date from that year.

Duits were issued by Utrecht (most years from 1742 to 1794), Holland (most years from 1726 to 1793), Gelderland (1731 and 1732, then most years from 1771 to 1794), Zeeland (most years from 1726 to 1794), and West Friesland (most years from 1729 to 1794). Each coin bore the crowned arms of the respective province on the obverse, and the VOC monogram, date and the respective mintmarks; minor changes were made to the design of the duits over the period of issue. Silver and gold presentation strikes exist.

Half duit coins, featuring the same designs (except Utretcht's, which lacked the lion supporters on the Utrecht shield seen on the full duit) but with half the weight, were much less popular, and were minted only by Utrecht (between 1752 and 1770), Holland (1749 to 1754, and 1769–1770), Gelderland (1788 and 1789), Zeeland (1770–1772 and 1789), and West Friesland (1769 and 1770). No double duits were minted at all.

Along with the imported duits, in 1764, 1765 and 1783, duits were produced under authority of the Company in Java, with one side inscribed 'DUYT JAVAS [date]', and the other the same text in Arabic. These coins lacked both VOC monogram and arms.

The duit gradually became more popular over the 18th century. Ten million were sent to the Indies in the 1770s alone. They circulated alongside the picis for most of the 18th century, and by 1800 the duit had superseded the inconvenient picis in Java.

During the second half of the 18th century, old clipped silver stuivers were valued at 4 duits, and new ones at 5 duits.

=== Batavian Mint ===
==== Gold Javan ducat ====
The Batavian mint opened in 1744, following a treaty with Pakubuwono II, first Susuhunan of Mataram, which for the first time gave the VOC the right to mint coinage. Between 1744 and 1808, however, total coin production was valued at only around ƒ4 million.

The mint's first product was the Javan gold ducats or dirhams, produced 1744–1746, valued at four silver rupees, and made of 4.3 g of fine gold, with writing only in Arabic.

Double ducats (also gold) were minted 1746–1748. Very few were issued.

After 1748, minting of the Javan ducat ended, due to counterfeiting.

From 1753, imported gold Dutch ducats began to be counterstamped in Batavia with the Arabic letters 'DJAWA', and valued at ƒ6 and 12 stuivers, against ƒ6 for unstamped coins—a measure designed to discourage private import/export of the coins. Counterstamping ended in 1761 when its counterfeiting was noticed.

==== Silver Javan rupee ====
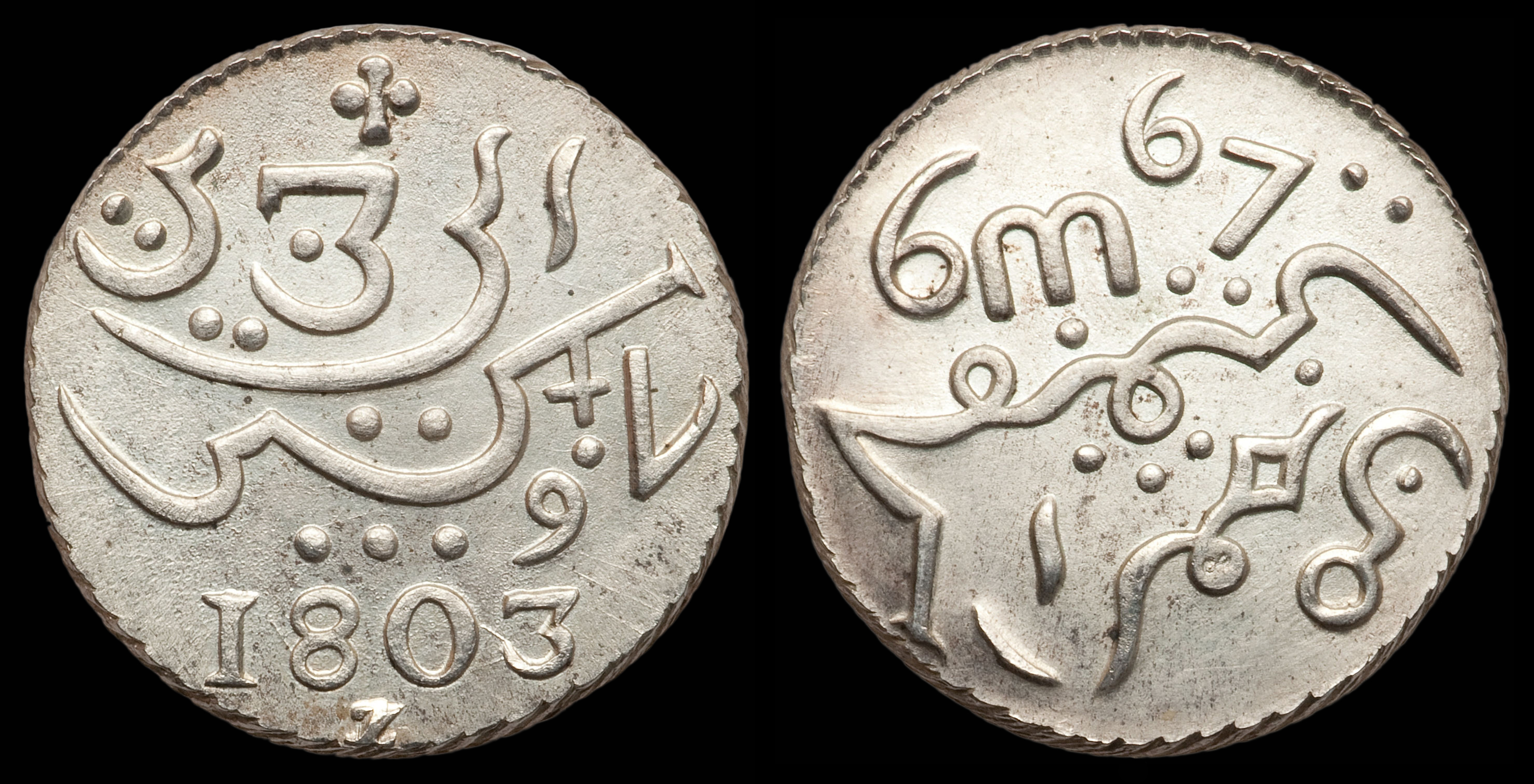
Netherlands Indies silver Java rupee 1803.

As the silver Indian rupee was a popular coin locally (reduced in value from 30 to 27 stuivers in 1735), a local version of it was issued in 1747, with Arabic text (reading 'Dirham [money] of the Dutch Company' and 'For the island Java the Great'), and only the date in Roman script, valued at 30 stuivers, identical in weight to the Surat rupee of the Mughal Empire. This continued only until in 1750, as it did not generate much profit. Subsequently, as with imported gold coinage, some imported rupees were counterstamped between 1753 and 1761, and given a 30 stuiver value.

The Batavian mint once again struck the silver rupee from 1764 to 1767, valued at 30 stuivers, but in early 1768 production ceased as enough silver coinage had been produced. Production resumed from 1783 to early 1789, and again from 1795 until 1798. The counterstamping of European gold ducatons was not a successful venture, and accordingly in 1766 gold single, double, and quadruple rupees, of 4, 8, and 16 grams of 20 carat gold, were produced. They were struck from the same dies used to make contemporary silver rupees. But due to counterfeiting, the coins were withdrawn from circulation in 1768. The coins were also referred to as 'quarter', 'half', and 'whole' rupees, as 16 silver rupees were worth a 'whole' rupee, on the same way that 16 Silver Indian Rupees equated to 1 Gold Mohur. Whole and half gold rupees were issued in 1783–1785, in a few thousand of each denomination.

Production of whole and half rupees resumed in 1796–1798. Although the VOC was nationalised in 1800, production of silver and gold rupees continued, and half gold rupees were issued 1800–1803 and 1807, with silver rupees issued 1800–1808, and half silver rupees also issued in 1805 and 1806.

=== Paper money ===
The VOC merged its deposit (De Bank Courant, established 1752) and lending banks (De Bank van Leening, established 1746) in 1752 as De Bank Courant en Bank van Leening, and began issuing paper money denominated in rijksdaalders, and earning 1/4% interest per month (reduced later to 1/8% and then to 1/12%). This bank paper became popular for its convenience.

Due to a lack of silver in the Indies caused by the war between the Dutch and English, the VOC began to issue credit paper in 1782. This credit paper was used to underwrite the bank paper, but due to lack of coin, the paper money lost its value, falling 20% by 1789.

The bank was finally closed down by the VOC on 7 April 1794 due to lack of enough capital to meet its obligations, with all notes due for exchange within 2 months.

=== Silver VOC coinage ===
Aside from the numerous varieties of VOC duit, the other major development of 18th-century Indies coinage occurred from 1786, when European powers started issuing colonial silver coinage in greater quantity, finally satisfying local demand (which led to fluctuating local values between large and small silver coins and between silver and copper). The denominations were 10 stuiver (1/2 guilder), 1 guilder and 3 guilder. Dates range from 1786 to 1791. The Dutch ducaton was valued at 80 stuiver, the various Indian and local rupees at 30 stuiver, and the 8 Real at 64 stuiver.

=== Copper bonk stuiver ===
Starting from 1796, the mint in Batavia began to produce heavy 'copper bonk' (bonk being Dutch for 'large piece') coinage formed from long copper bars imported from Japan, stamped with the denomination and date were produced. The coins exhibited significant variation in weight, and were crudely made. Denominations were 1 and 2 stuivers, with a weight of approximately 23 and 46 grams respectively (equivalent to the weight of 4 and 8 individual duit). Unlike similar money produced for Ceylon, they lacked the VOC monogram.

=== Stuiver coins ===
The Batavian mint began in 1799 the production of 1 stuiver coinage, formed of the lead-bronze of melted cannons, and weighing about 12 g each. These are dated 1799 and 1800.

=== Batavian Republic ===
The VOC was nationalised by the Netherlands (the Batavian Republic) in 1800, and a Council for Eastern Possessions was established to administer it. It was determined that the Indies had a great shortage of copper coinage, and so the minting of duits resumed at four mints in the Netherlands. Three of these used old VOC designs with new dates (from 1802 to 1806), while the fourth, the designated central mint of the new Republic at Enkhuizen, bore the inscription 'INDIA BATAV' where the VOC monogram had been, and with the arms of the Crowned States instead of the individual province's arms. These coins bore a value: 5 [1/2 duit coins equals] ƒ1/32 on the half duit, and 5 [equals] ƒ1/16 on the duit—the coins had been originally intended for use in the Cape of Good Hope, but due to the loss of that colony, where the duit was higher valued, they were sent to the Indies instead, at an initial value of 6 to the ƒ1/16. These latter duits were issued dated 1802–1809.

Silver coins of the Batavian East Indies, all dated 1802, were of ƒ1/16, ƒ1/8, ƒ1/4, ƒ1/2 and ƒ1 —the stuiver now formed purely in copper.

Aside from duit coins, the production of copper bonk stuiver continued under the Batavian Republic, but 1803 saw the weight of the stuiver reduced to 19 g, thus devaluing the stuiver from ƒ1/20 to ƒ1/24. Also 8 stuiver bonks were produced in 1803, as well as 1/2 stuiver bonks in 1804 and 1805, the latter being withdrawn in 1805 as a result of its short copper content leading to counterfeiting by cutting up higher denominations.

A private enterprise established in 1806 saw yet more VOC-branded duits in issue, these bearing the monogram on one side and the word JAVA and the date on the other.

=== Kingdom of Holland ===
With the Batavian Republic in the Netherlands having collapsed, the new administration of the Kingdom of Holland under the authority of Louis Napoleon, appointed Herman Willem Daendels as Governor-General. Daendels borrowed 736,00 rijksdaalders in the form of credit paper. These borrowings lacked backing with sufficient silver, and increased the money supply. The old De Bank Courant en Bank van Leening was reopened in 1809.

Daendels appropriated the private Javan duit-issuing enterprise in 1808, gradually replacing the VOC monogram with the simple letters 'LN'. In the period 1808–1810 both forms of duit were minted, while 1811 duits only exist bearing the LN monogram.

In addition to the duits, 1/2 stuiver and stuiver pieces were minted locally in copper in 1810 and 1811, while many foreign coins were counterstamped LN.

The only coins to be imported from Holland during this period were 1/2 duit and duit coins of the 'INDIA BATAV' pattern. The counterstamps foreign coins are forgeries made in the beginning of the 1900s.

=== British rule ===
The Dutch administration, since 1810 led by Governor-General Jan Willem Janssens, was replaced following the British invasion of Java in 1811, and the appointment of Stamford Raffles as Governor-General.

Raffles initially re-established the 8 Real (rather than the rijksdaalder) as the standard coin, recalling 8.5 million rijksdaalder of banknotes for silver. Spanish Dollar bankpaper was issued in 1812.

Subsequently, the British minted silver rupees (of the same weight as previous issues, and still worth 30 stuivers or 120 duit) and half rupees, the latter seen as a convenient new denomination for payment, from 1811 to 1817 bearing Javanese and Arabic text and dates, as well as gold half mohurs (rupees) of 1813–1816, this activity continuing for a couple of years after return to Netherlands authority. After the introduction of the rupee, the British began issuing Javan rupee bank paper instead of Real

A shortage of copper currency was found; copper duits were produced in 1811–1812 bearing the British East India Company's mark 'VEIC', 'JAVA', and the date. A lack of raw copper led to an experiment with melted cannon; this succeeded only in destroying the dies. A request by Raffles to Calcutta mint to produce 50 million duit could not be met, and so the British produced 50 million tin duits in 1813 and 1814, at roughly half the weight of the copper duits. These coins were not widely accepted and over a million were returned, and on the return to Dutch control, the Dutch refused to recognise the coins.

A request for copper three and six stuiver coins could not be met due to the inadequacy of the mint machinery, and instead stuivers (1814 and 1815) and copper half stuivers (1811–1815) were produced.

=== Dutch rule (restored) ===
Dutch rule was restored in 1814–1816 as a result of the treaty between the Netherlands and Britain returning the former Dutch possessions. The first coins to be minted were at the Surabaya mint: duits (1814–1826) and half duits (1814–1822) of the 'INDIA BATAV' design. The half duits were updated to read 1/8 ST (stuiver), minted 1822–1826, while 1/4 ST coins were minted 1822–1826. As no double duit designs existed of modern design, that coin only appeared as 1/2 ST, from 1818 to 1828. Starting from 1822, 'INDIA BATAV' was replaced with 'NEDERL INDIE' on all coins.

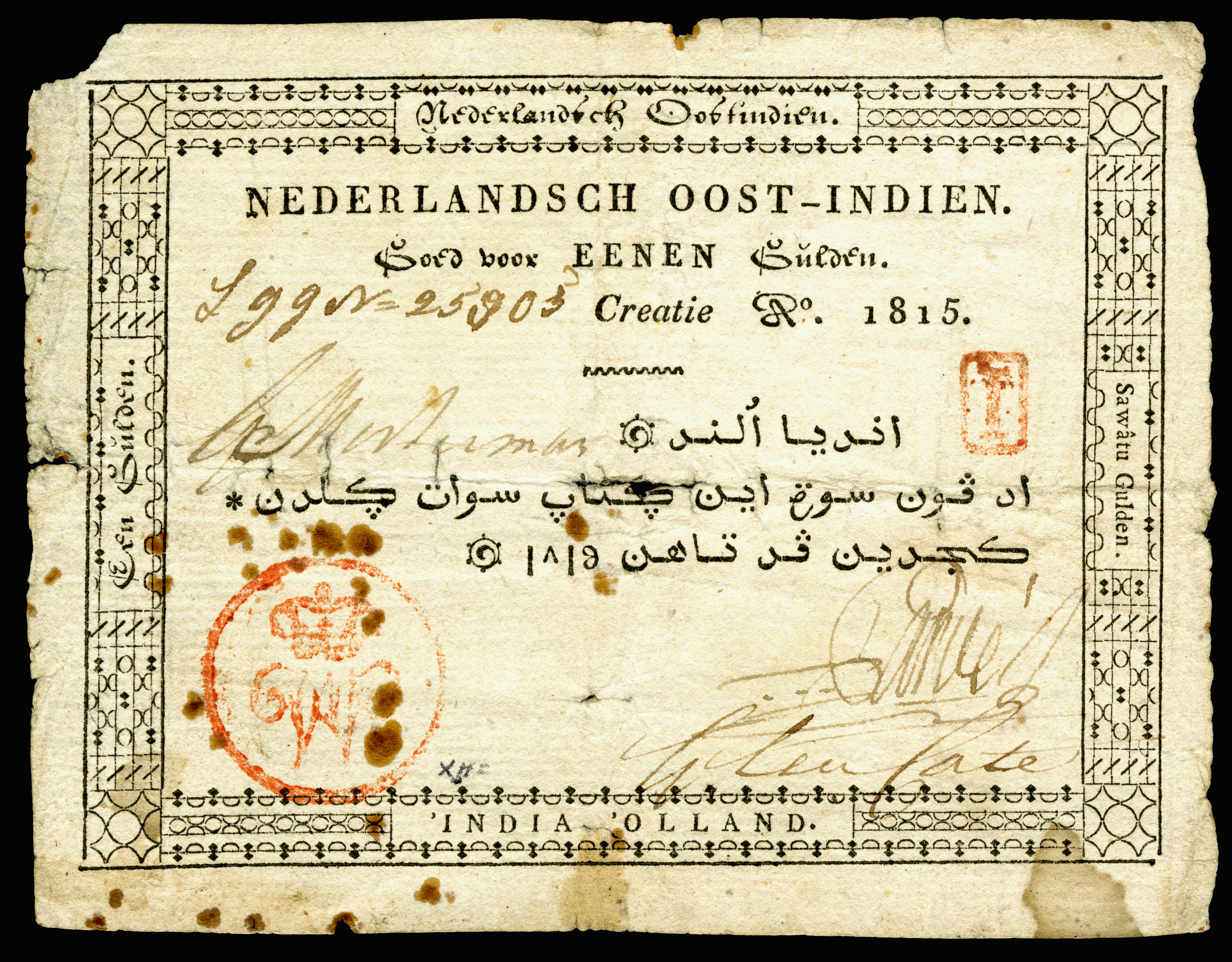
One guilder from the first Dutch government issued paper money in the Netherlands Indies (1815).

The Indies government in 1815 issued a series of credit paper, with denominations of ƒ1, ƒ5, ƒ10, ƒ25, ƒ50, ƒ100, ƒ300, ƒ600 and ƒ1000. De Bank Courant en Bank van Leening, which was woefully short of capital, was nationalised in 1817. The Dutch closed the bank in 1818, giving people six months to exchange their banknotes before they were declared worthless.

There had long been a shortage of copper coinage in the Indies, and as a consequence Chinese and Japanese copper coins were in general circulation. French centime coins had been imported in 1811, but subsequently withdrawn; in 1818 to address the shortage, copper bonks were once again issued in 1/2, 1, and 2 stuiver denominations. Although ƒ400,000-worth were produced, they had been severely debased at 15 g of copper to the stuiver, and they were eventually withdrawn in 1826.

The Surabaya mint, closed in 1828, was reopened as a consequence of the high demand for coinage created by the Cultivation System. Duit and double duit coins, which had, on the initiative of the mint, the decimal denominations 1c (cent) and 2c, were minted 1833–1841; in total around one billion 1 cent and half a billion 2-cent coins were minted, which, alongside the minting of 1790-dated 'Utrecht' VOC duits (which were minted locally, as the VOC duits were popular with the population, using imported dies of the 18th century design but with different mintmarks) in 1827, 1834, 1835, 1840, 1841, 1842 and 1843. The only ever VOC double duits, also dated 1790, were minted 1840–1843. With demand finally satiated, in 1843 the Batavia and Surabaya mints were closed permanently, and all subsequent Indies coinage was imported.

The first silver coinage minted for the colony were ƒ99,000 coins minted in Utrecht in 1821 (several million more were minted in 1839 and 1840). ƒ1/4 and ƒ1/2 coins were minted in 1826 and 1827 in numbers over a million, with the former also minted in 1840.

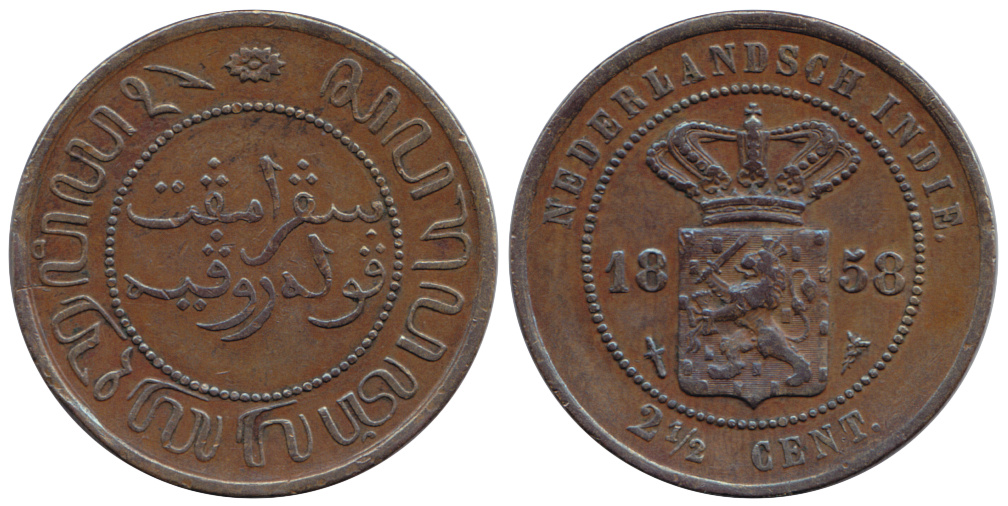
Copper 2 1/2 cent coin, 1858.

Coinage was finally fully decimalised in 1854, with copper 1/2c, 1c and 2 1/2c and silver ƒ1/20, ƒ1/10 and ƒ1/4 (although the 1821–1840 coinage continued to circulate). The new coinage bore Arabic script alongside Dutch language, which earlier Dutch-minted had not done. The ƒ1/20 was only issued in 1854 and 1855, because it was too small to be convenient, but all other denominations continued to be issued until 1945, with copper changing to bronze from 1914, the addition of silver ƒ1 and ƒ2 1/2 coins in 1943 (in earlier years regular Dutch coins of ƒ1/2, ƒ1 and ƒ2 1/2 had circulated alongside the Indies ones), and a copper-nickel 5-cent that was issued in 1913, 1921 and 1922. No coins in any denomination were minted between 1861 and 1881. The last coins are dated 1941–1945 and were minted in the USA while the Dutch were tied up in World War II and the Japanese were ruling the Indies.

=== De Javasche Bank ===
King William I of the Netherlands granted the right to create a bank in the Indies in 1826. The bank, known as "De Javasche Bank" (DJB), was opened in Batavia on 24 January 1828, with exclusive rights to operate for 10 years, until 31 December 1837. Authorised capital was 8000 shares of ƒ500, to be sold in four tranches of 2000 shares each.

Its first issue of bank paper was made on 11 March 1828, after the bank had received subscriptions in gold and silver for 2043 shares. The notes were in denominations of ƒ25 up to ƒ1000 (the bank was not allowed to issue notes below ƒ10), totalling ƒ1.12 million of issued paper. The bank opened branches in Semarang and Surabaya in 1829.

Due to a lack of bullion reserves, towards the end of the expiry of the first rights, kopergeld ('copper money notes') were issued. These were redeemable on the basis of 'tegen honderd duiten de guilder'—or 100 duit to the guilder.

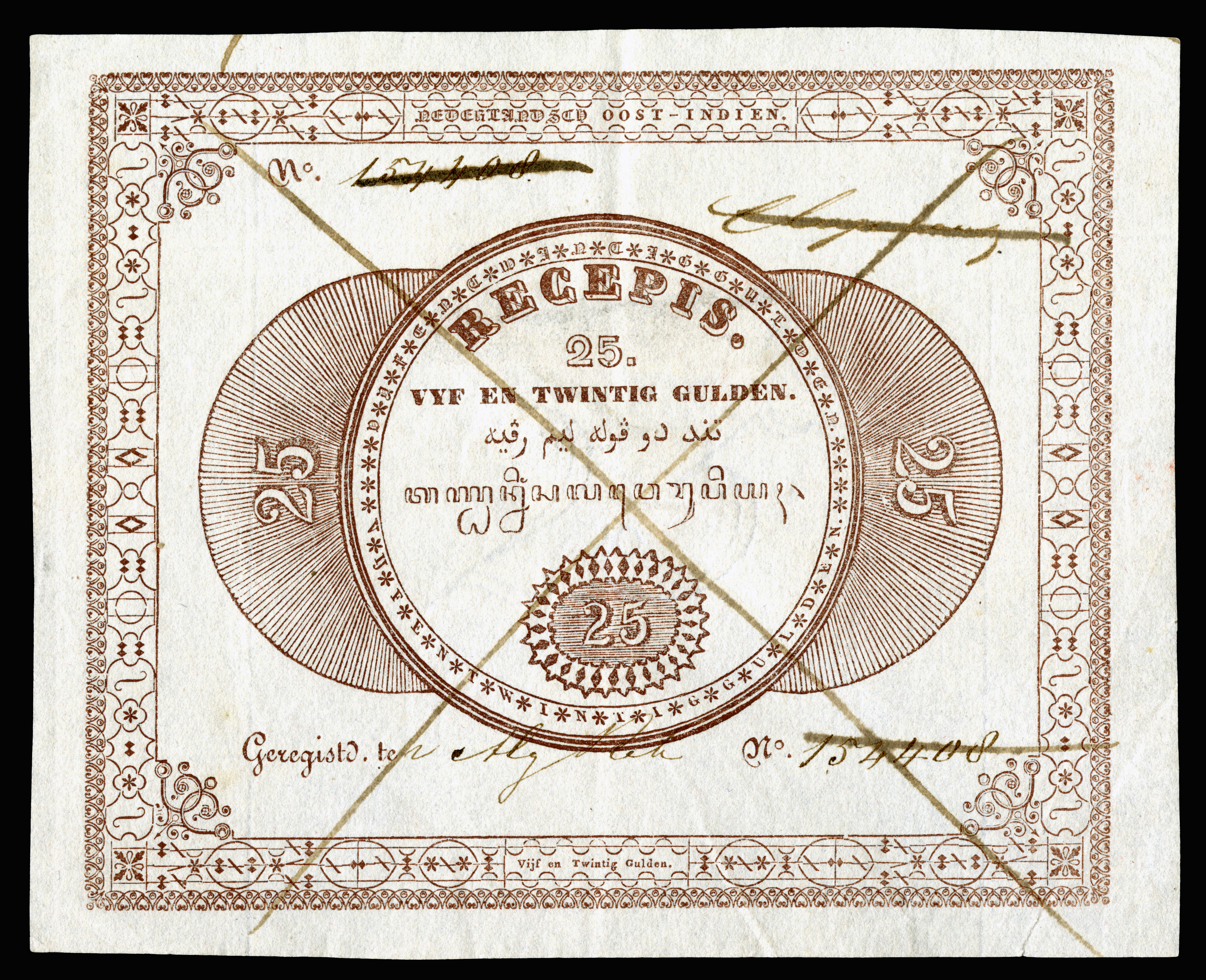
ƒ25 "recepis" issued c. 1846.

The bank's rights were renewed for a further ten years from 1838, with the second tranche of shares sold. Further copper notes were issued in 1842–1845. Due to a lack of silver coinage in circulation, a series of "recepis" for silver were issued for which the copper notes were exchanged at a rate of 6 copper guilder to 5 recepis guilder. The recepis were also exchangeable for other commercial paper, although not legal tender (only the bank's 1828 notes were legal tender).

The banks rights were renewed again from 1848 to 1858, with no further capital acquired. On 8 May 1854, the government announced that Dutch currency (of 1847 and later) was legal tender in the Indies. The bank's rights were temporarily extended until 31 March 1860, and the silver recipes were deemed exchangeable with any valid payment instrument.

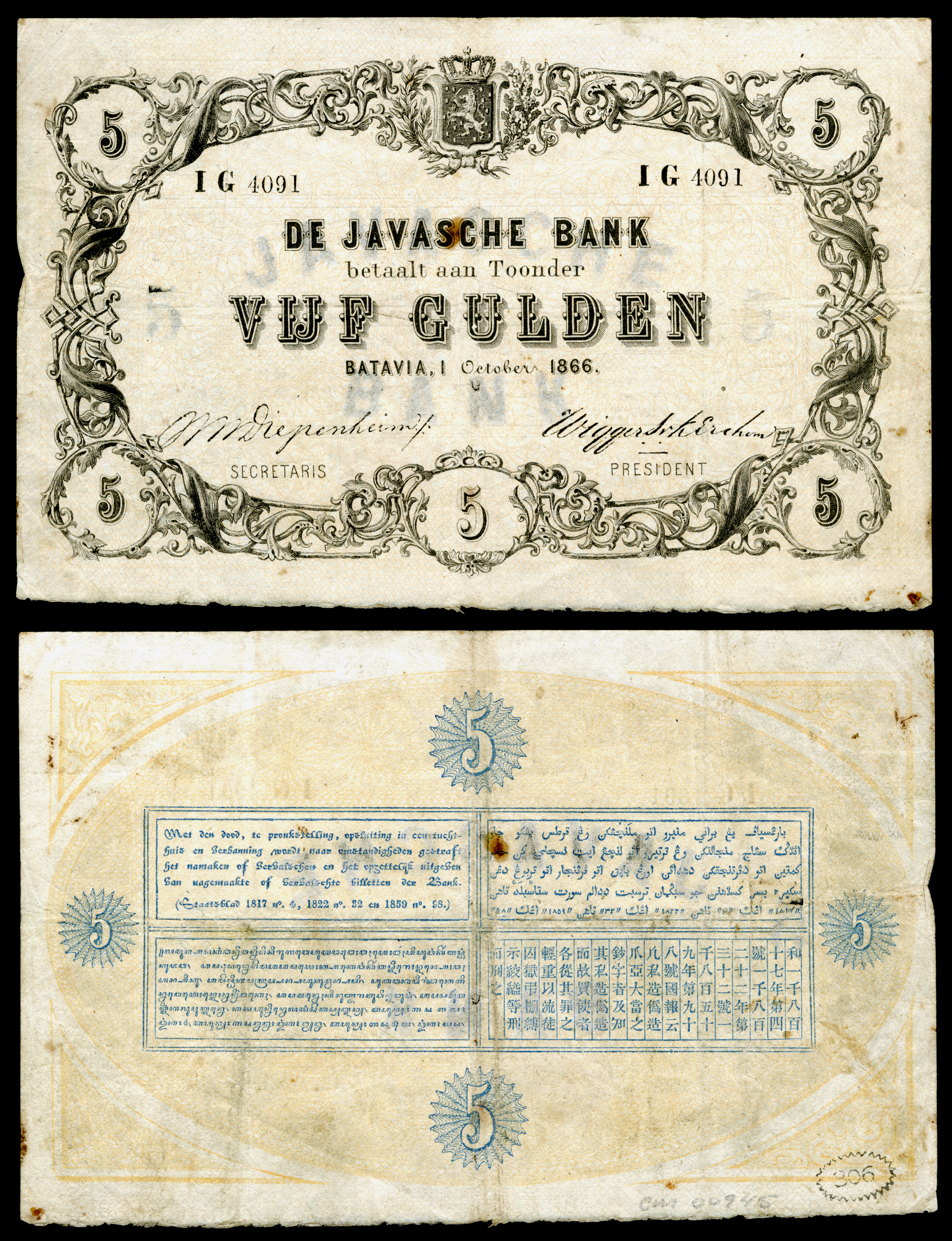
De Javasche Bank-ƒ5 (1866)

The bank's fourth exclusive rights were granted from 1860 to 1870, increasing the bank's capital to the full ƒ4 million, permitting the bank to open branches outside Java, and extending the range of bank paper issuable down to ƒ10 as well as allowing larger denominations. It was provided that the bank should guarantee two-thirds of the value of its banknotes with valid payment instruments. Thus the second series of bank notes was issued in 1861 in denominations of ƒ10, ƒ25, ƒ50, ƒ100, ƒ500 and ƒ1000, and the 1846 silver recipes were withdrawn. DJB opened branches in Padang (August 1864), Surakarta (November 1867), Makassar (December 1864), Cirebon (August 1866) and Pasuruan (November 1867). In 1864 a new design of banknotes was introduced, including new ƒ5, ƒ200 and ƒ300 denominations.

The bank's rights were once again renewed, from 1870 to 1881, and capital was increased to six million guilder. The Yogyakarta branch was opened in 1878.

The bank's rights were extended 1881 to 1891, and it was reincorporated as a new company, with the same capital of six million guilder in 1881.

The bank's rights were extended for 15 years from 1891 to 1906, at which point an office was opened (in 1891) in Amsterdam. New banknote designs were introduced from 1897 depicting JP Coen. The bank's rights were extended again from 1906 to 1921.

Due to metal supply issues, the government was first authorised after World War 1 to issue treasury notes (denominations below ƒ5, which were in the issue of the central bank), which it did in 1919. The same metal supply issue arose in 1940, during World War 2, with low value notes of ƒ1/2, ƒ1 and ƒ2 1/2.

The series of Exclusive Rights were brought to an end in 1922, with De Javasche Bank Act, and the bank's capital was increased by 50% to ƒ9 million. The bank was prohibited from issuing notes of less than ƒ5, and all banknote designs were to be officially published. A new series of banknotes was issued, recalling all old bank paper. The notes again depicted JP Coen. They ranged from ƒ5 to ƒ1000, and were issued from 1925 to 1931. New notes showing wayang dancers began to be issued from 1934, in ƒ5 and ƒ10 denominations, and from 1939 to 1939 in denominations from ƒ5 to ƒ1000, but due to the economic conditions of the time, few of the higher denominations were never issued.

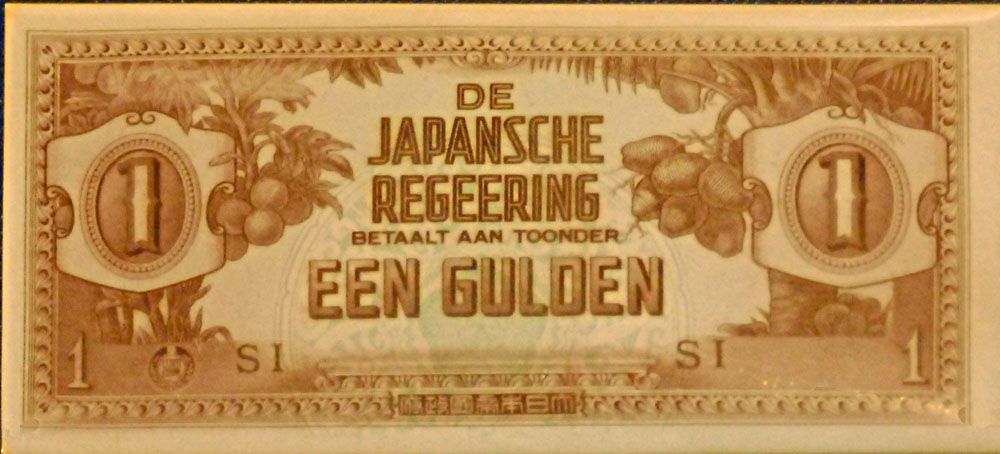
One guilder, Japanese occupation currency, Dutch East Indies

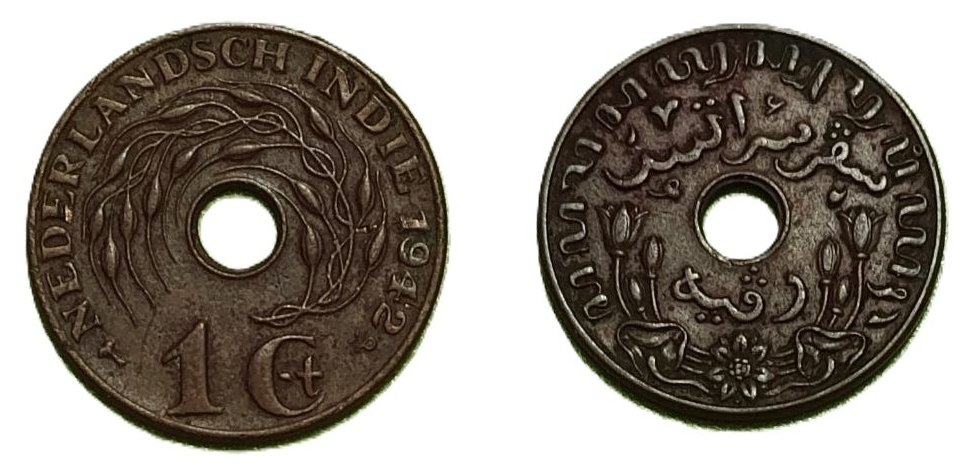
The last of Dutch East Indies 1 cent coin, from 1942, before they were driven out by the Japanese. Uses Javanese script, Jawi script, and Latin

In 1942, the Japanese successfully invaded the Indies, bringing with their invasion fleet their own version of the guilder, in denominations of 1c, 5c and 10c, ƒ1/2, ƒ1, ƒ5 and ƒ10.

By 1944 they had decided that engendering a collective Asian nationalism would be the key to keeping control, and they replaced the Dutch-style guilder notes by the Netherlands Indies roepiah, an Indonesian-language version of the guilder.

The Dutch government in exile ordered notes for issue on their return to Indonesia, and these were printed in the US in 1942, dated 1943. They began to be issued in the eastern islands of the archipelago (which the Dutch captured early on) from 1944 to 1945. Because of Dutch fears about damage to De Javasche Bank from the war, they were issued under the authority of the Dutch government instead, hence they were known as the 'NICA guilder' (Netherlands Indies Civil Administration guilder). In Java and Sumatra, Indonesian nationalists were insurgent, and the Dutch were initially confined to only a few cities. In both islands the Japanese invasion money continued to circulate among both Indonesian and Dutch, until supplies ran out.

The issue in 1946 of the first Indonesian rupiah by the provisional Republican government in Jakarta resulted in conflict between the rival currencies and administrations. The Dutch money was not tolerated by the Indonesian nationalists, who insisted on the use of only Indonesian money.

After 1946 De Javasche Bank resumed note production, with 5, 10 and 25 guilder notes. These bore in Indonesian language the word "roepiah". The NICA guilder, on the other hand, bore the image of the Dutch Queen, and was far from sensitive to nationalist feeling. Further notes simply saying "Indonesia" were issued in 10 and 25 sen denominations in 1947.

Between 1946 and 1948 the Dutch succeeded in expanding the area of land under their control, but international feeling was against them, so in November 1949, peace was brokered. One of the conditions was that "De Javasche Bank" remained as the central bank of the new nation of "Republik Indonesia Serikat" (United States of Indonesia). Thus the first internationally recognised currency of the new nation of Indonesia still bore the words "guilder", and "De Javasche Bank", reusing the 1946 (even retaining the date, 1946) De Javasche Bank notes, changing only the colour, and with additional denominations of ƒ50, ƒ100, ƒ500 and ƒ1000. Further De Javasche Bank notes, in a new design, were dated "1948", with ƒ1/2, ƒ1 and ƒ2 1/2 denominations, and were also issued upon Indonesian independence, along with new 'Republik Indonesia Serikat' notes in Rp5 and Rp10 (not guilder) denominations.

The feeling for "Indonesianisation" was strong, and so De Javasche Bank was nationalised and renamed as "Bank Indonesia" over the period 1951 to 1953, and Bank Indonesia rupiah notes began to replace the guilder from 1953.

== See also ==
- Indonesian rupiah
