= Deut =

Deut may refer to:

- Deut (coin), an historical north German and Dutch coin
- Deut, another name for Kang Kek Iew
- An abbreviation for the Book of Deuteronomy
