= Top TV (disambiguation) =

Top TV may refer to:

- StarSat (formerly TopTV until 31 October 2013), a South African direct broadcast satellite television service
- Top TV (Indonesia), a subscription television product merged into MNC Vision
- Top TV Network, a network of 5 television stations in East Indonesia
- TOP TV, former name of a Bulgarian television channel
