= Cenderawasih =

Cenderawasih or cendrawasih may refer to:

- Paradisaea, a genus of birds of paradise known in Indonesian as "cenderawasih"
- Cendrawasih (dance), a Balinese dance inspired by the bird of paradise
- Cenderawasih Bay, a large bay in Western Papua, Indonesia
- Cenderawasih languages, a group of languages spoken around the bay
- Cenderawasih Pos, the major newspaper of Papua, Indonesia
- Cenderawasih University, Papua, Indonesia
- Cendrawasih Papua F.C., a football club of Indonesia
