= Jayapura =

Capital and largest city of Papua, Indonesia

- City
- City of Jayapura; Kota Jayapura
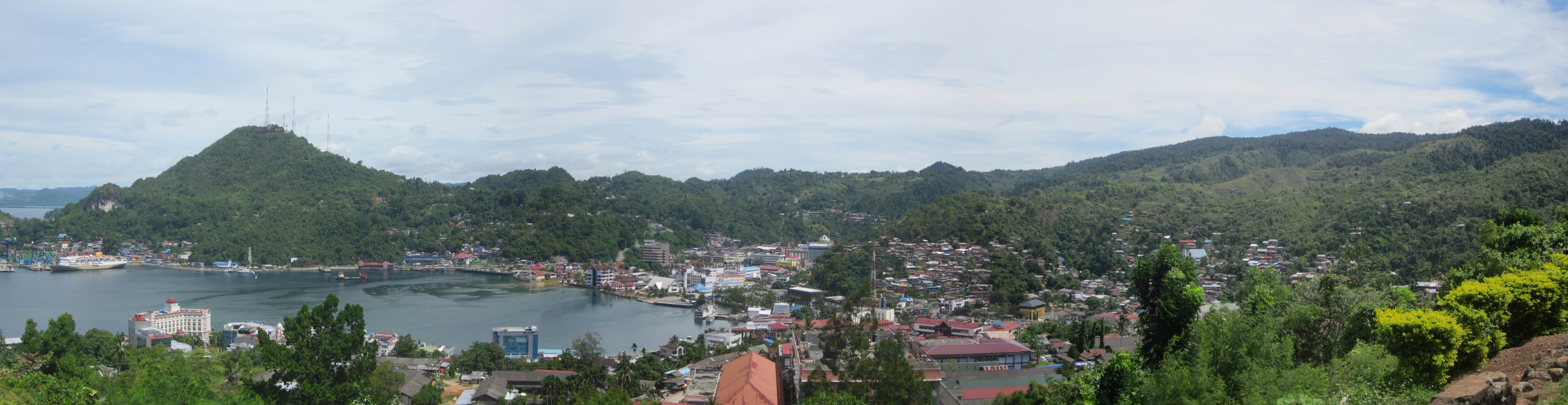
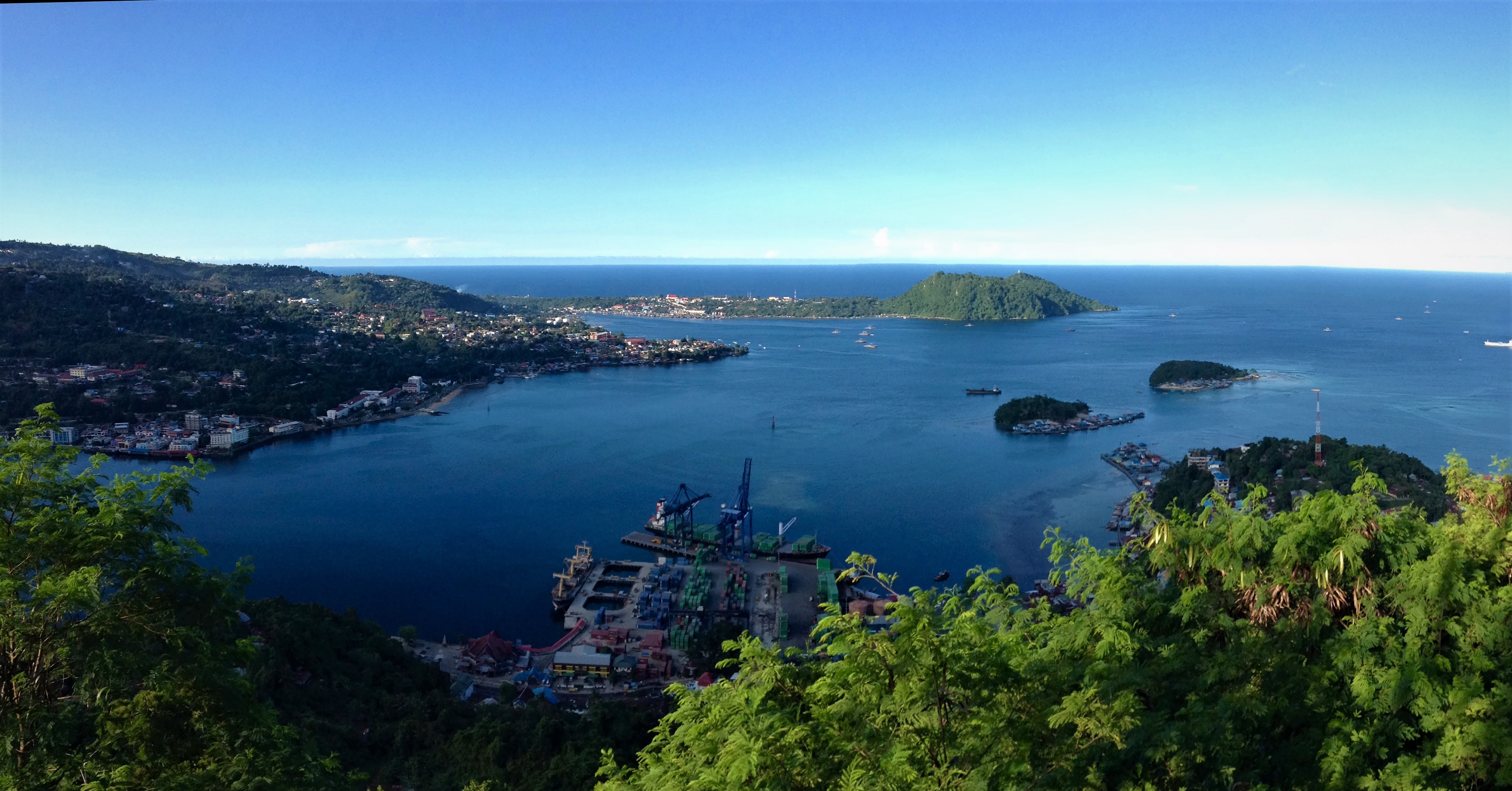
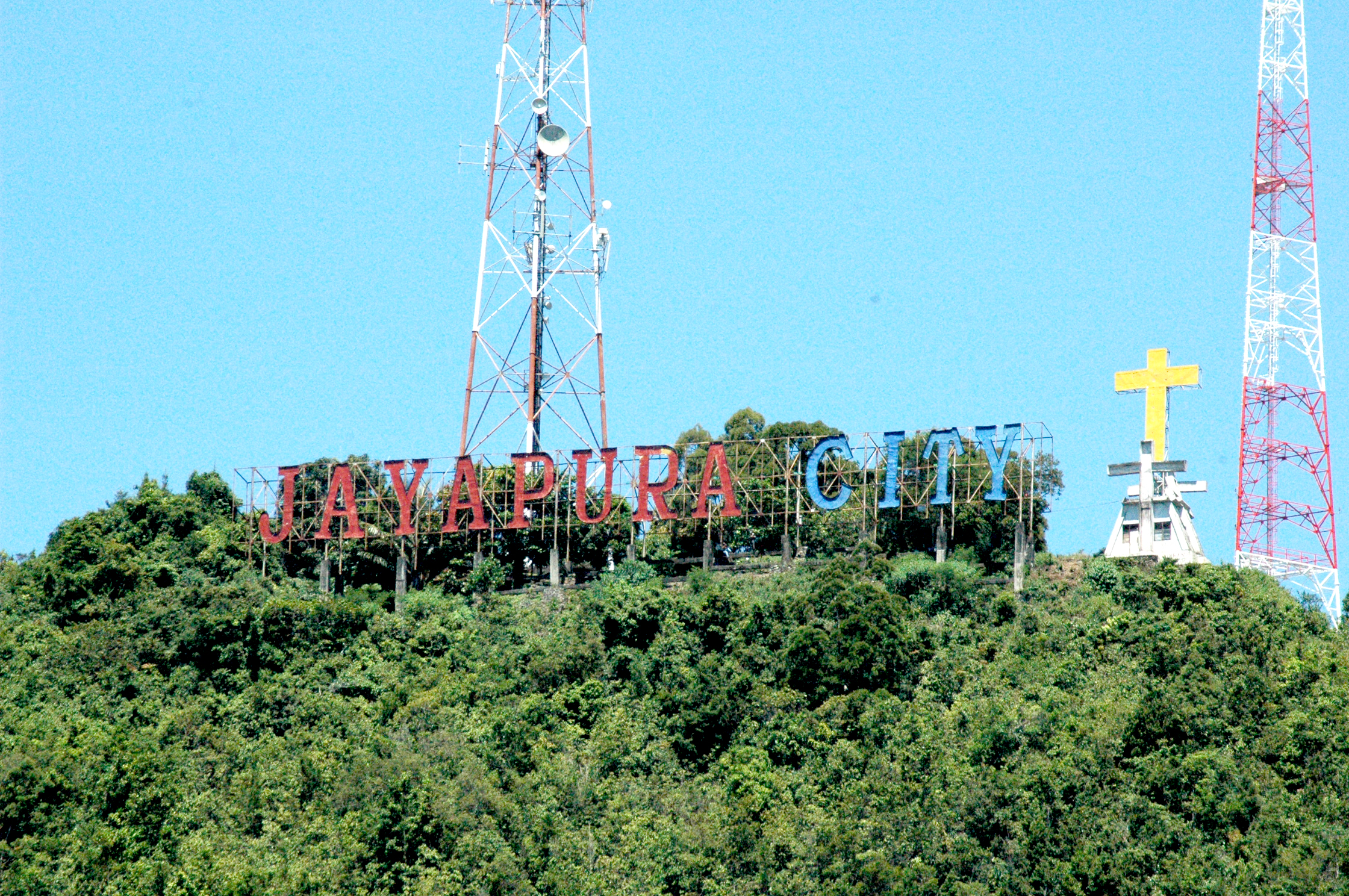
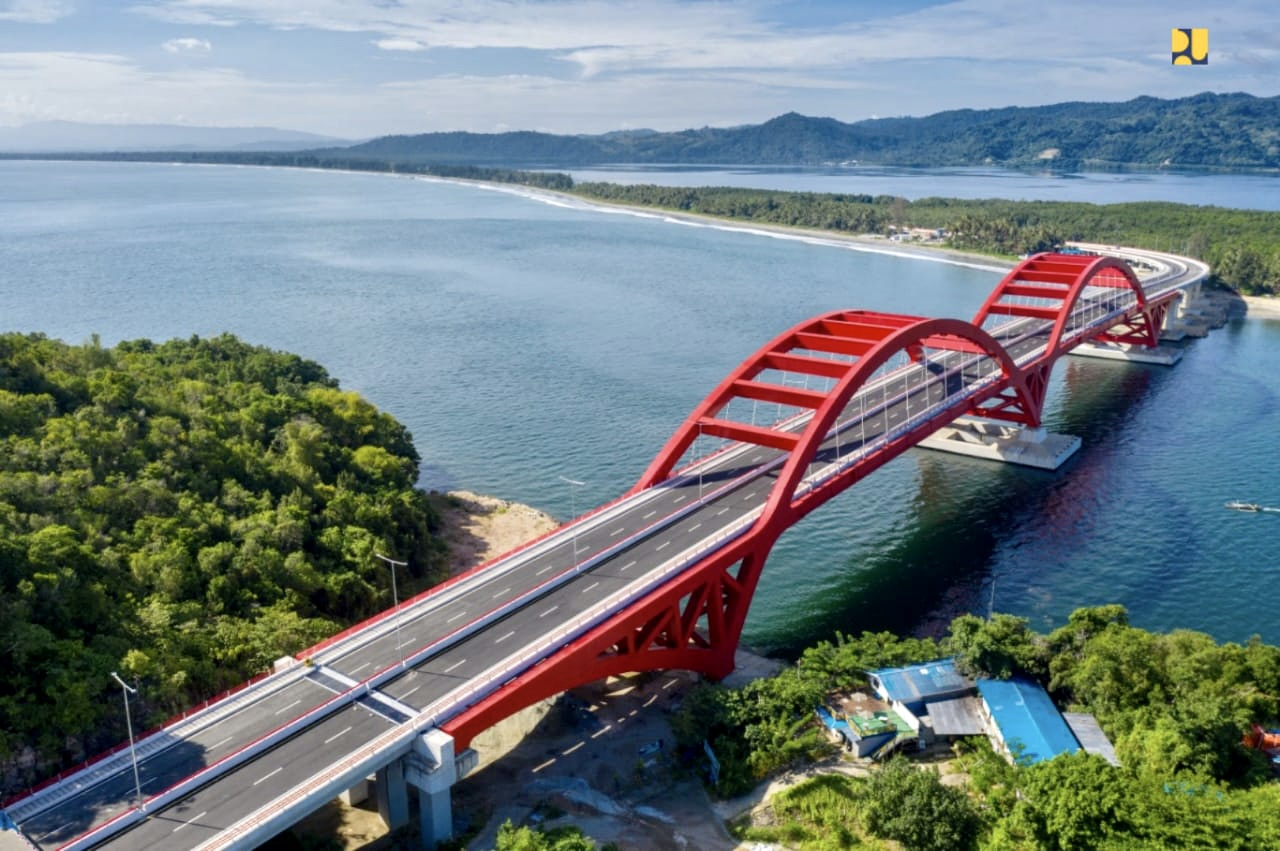
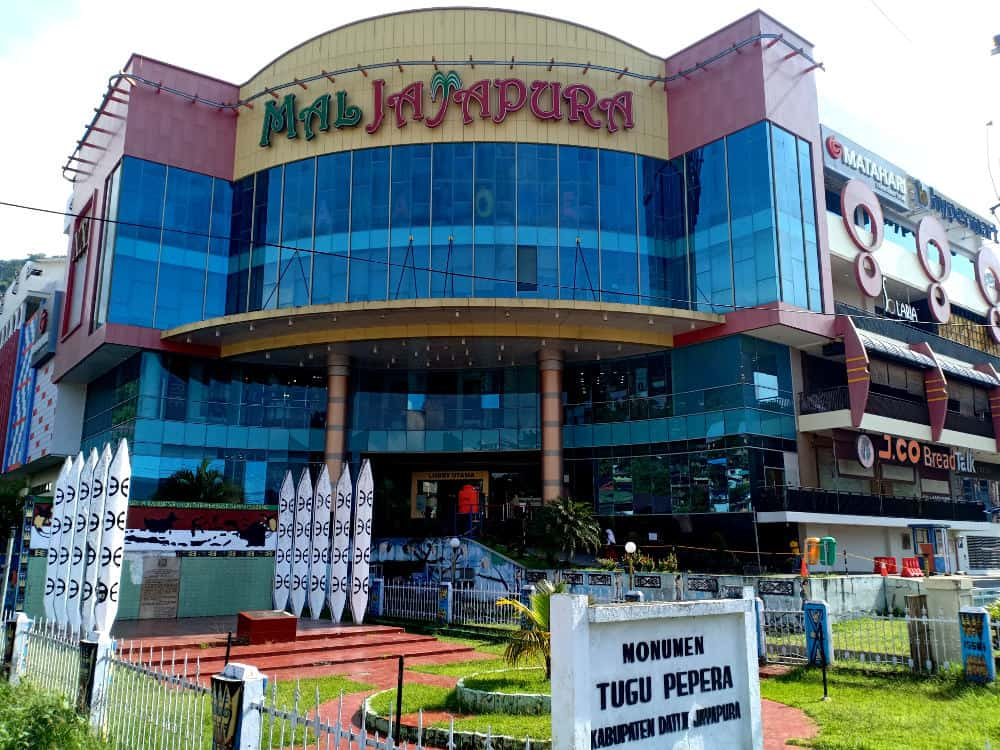
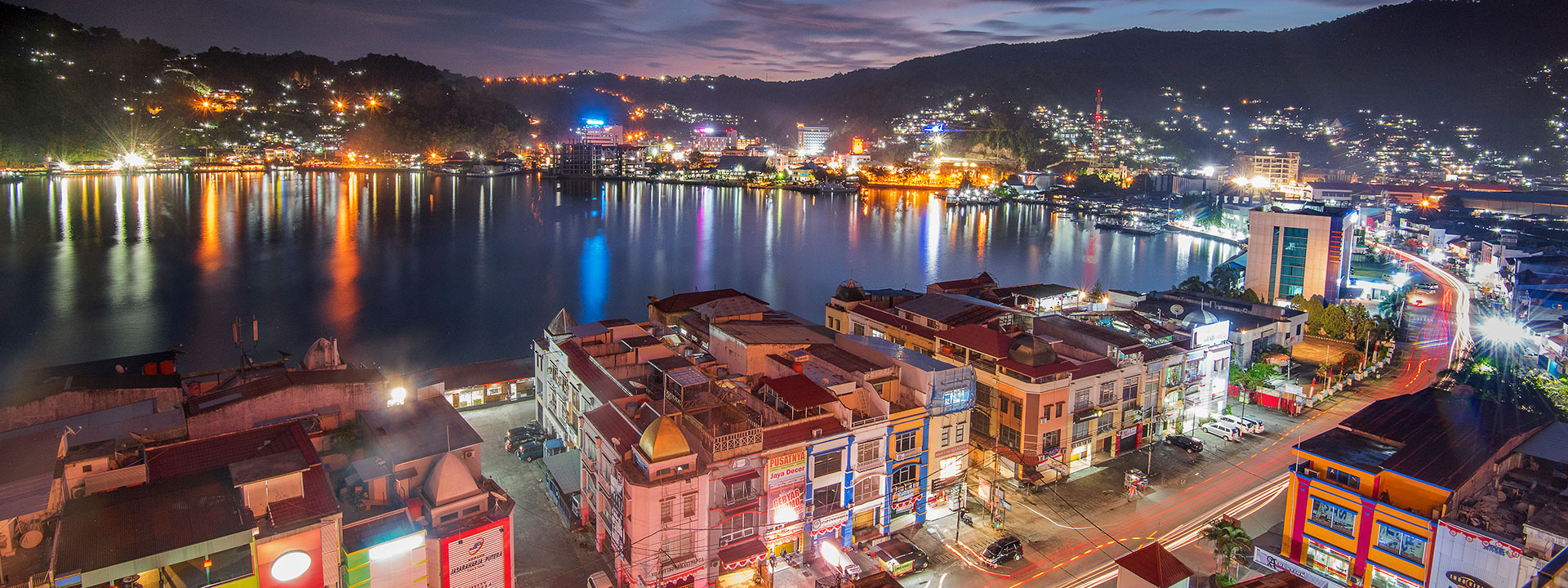
- Panoramic view of Jayapura Jayapura Port within Humboldt Bay Jayapura City signboard Youtefa Bridge Mal Jayapura Mal Jayapura, and Jayapura City view at night

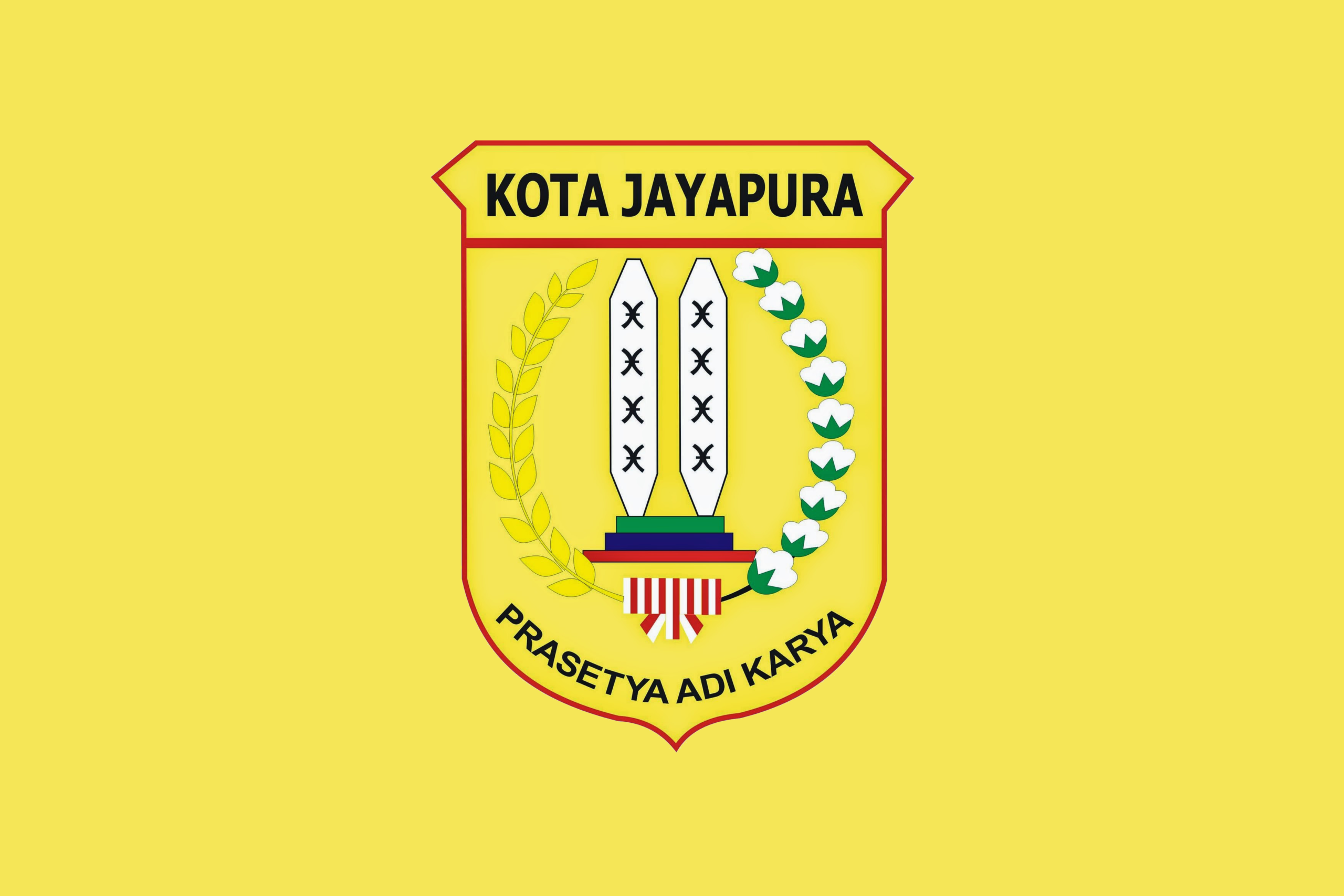
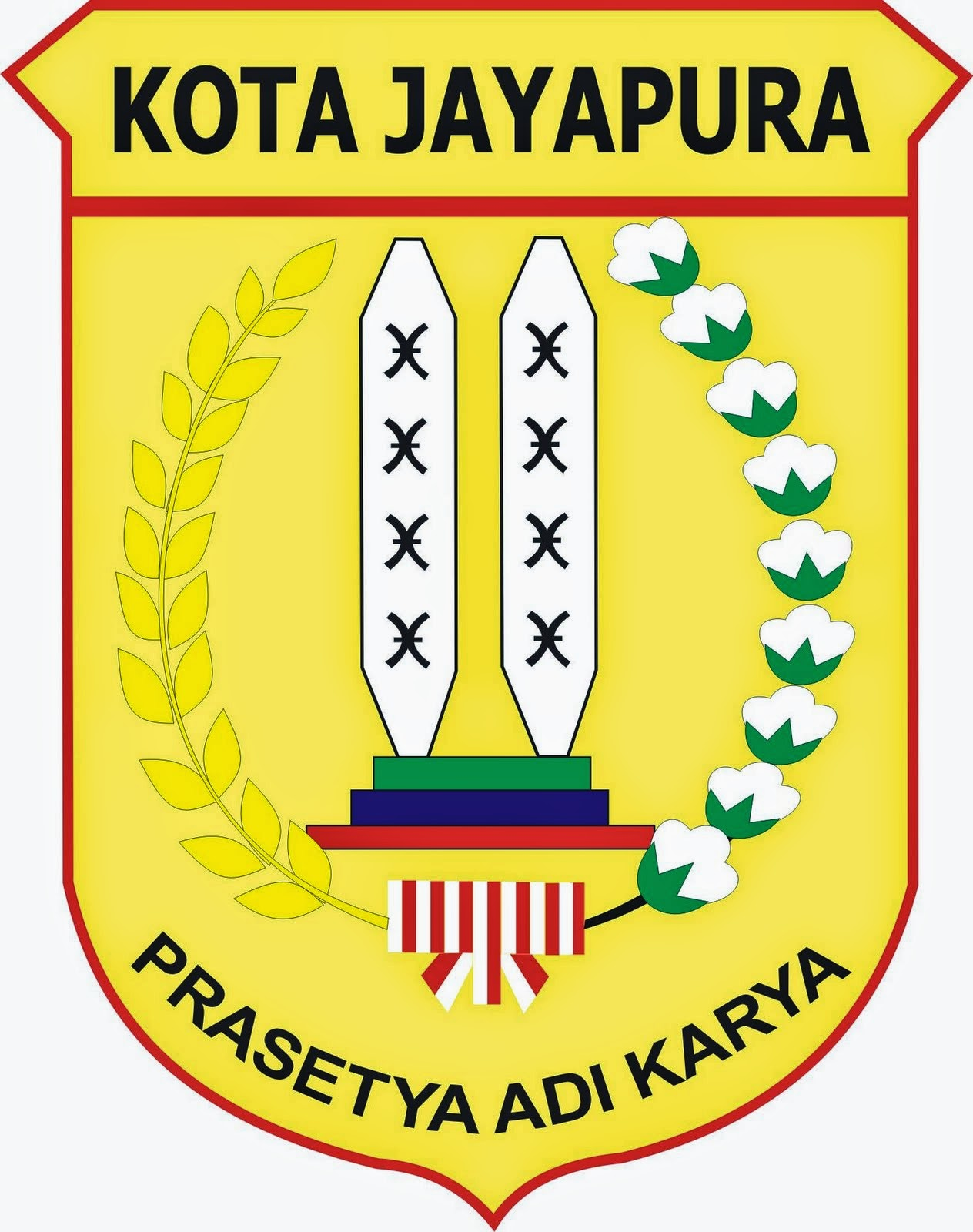
- Flag Coat of arms
- Motto(s): Hen Tecahi Yo Onomi, T'mar Ni Hanased (One Heart Builds a City for God's Glory)
- Location in Papua Province
- Interactive map of Jayapura
- Location in Indonesian Papua Location in Indonesia
- Coordinates: 2°31′58.8″S 140°43′1.2″E
- Country: Indonesia
- Province: Papua
- Founded: 7 March 1910 (as Hollandia)
- Incorporated: 2 August 1993

Government
  - Mayor: Abisai Rollo (Golkar)
  - Vice Mayor: Rustan Saru
  - Legislature: Jayapura City House of Representatives

Area
  - Total: 835.48 km^{2} (322.58 sq mi)
- Elevation: 287 m (942 ft)

Population (mid 2024 estimate)
  - Total: 410,852
  - Density: 491.76/km^{2} (1,273.6/sq mi)
- Time zone: UTC+9 (Indonesia Eastern Time)
- Area code: (+62) 967
- Climate: Af
- HDI: ▲0.801 (Very High)
- Website: jayapurakota.go.id

Jayapura is the capital and largest city of the Indonesian province of Papua on the island of New Guinea. It is situated on the northern coast of the island and covers an area of 835.48 km^{2} (322.58 sq mi). The city borders the Pacific Ocean and Yos Sudarso Bay to the north, the country of Papua New Guinea to the east, Keerom Regency to the south, and Jayapura Regency to the west.

With a population of 410,852 according to the official estimates for mid 2024 (comprising 218,356 males and 192,416 females), Jayapura is the second most populous city in the entire island of New Guinea, after Port Moresby, the capital of Papua New Guinea. During the 2010–2020 decade it was also the fastest-growing city in Indonesia, with the population increasing by 55.23% between 2010 and 2020.

Jayapura is the fourth largest city by economy in Eastern Indonesia—after Makassar, Denpasar, and Manado—with an estimated 2016 GDP at Rp19.48 trillion. Jayapura has a very high Human Development Index (HDI) at 0.801.

== Etymology ==
Jayapura is Sanskrit for "city of victory" (जय jaya: "victory"; पुर pura: "city") and was named by Suharto as part of the de-Sukarnoization.

During the Dutch colonial era the city was called Hollandia, based on the Holland region. In 1945, the Dutch made Hollandia the capital of then Netherlands New Guinea. After the territory was handed over to the United Nations Temporary Executive Authority, on 1 October 1962, the city went by a dual Dutch/Indonesian name: Hollandia/Kota Baru (New Town). When Indonesia took control over the city on 1 May 1963, it became solely Kota Baru. In 1964, the city was briefly renamed Sukarnapura, after then-President Sukarno, until the end of 1968, when it acquired its present name.

Nowadays, there are calls from some citizens, government officials and academicians, to rename the city to better reflect the locals like the naming of Youtefa Bridge. Some suggestions include Kota Tabi as the city is in the customary region of Tabi, Port Numbay, or just Numbay as "Port" is English and not a native word. The word "Numbay" comes from the river Numbay which flows to the city. It has the meaning "clear water" while "Tabi" means "sunrise" in the local Kayo Pulau language.

== History ==
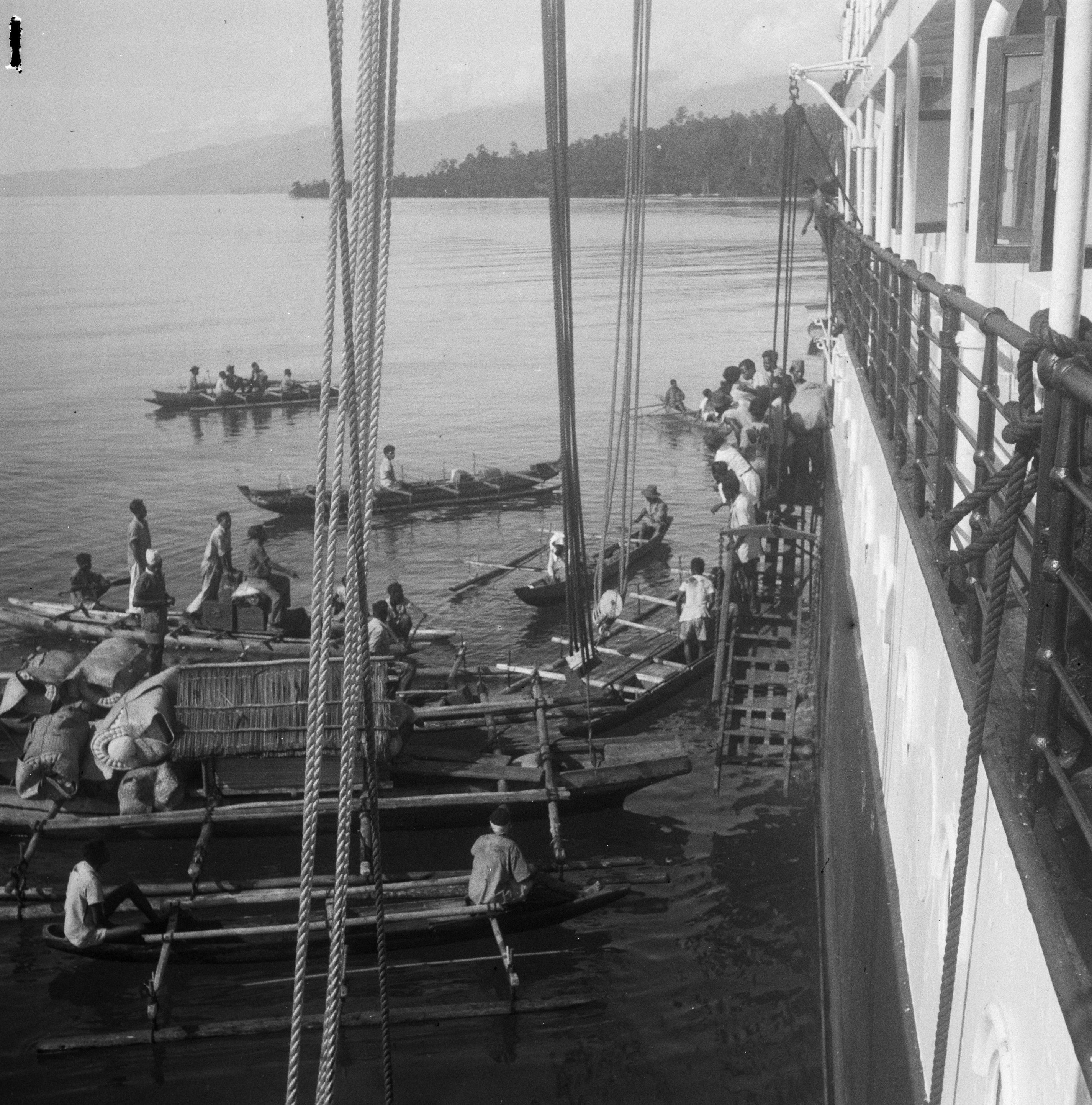
Hollandia Haven or Hollandia (now Jayapura) port in 1947

Before its inclusion into the colonial government of the Dutch Indies, the location of present-day Jayapura was known as Numbay. Before the arrival of the Dutch there was an active trade in Numbay, centered on the Island of Metui Debi and the area where the former Gereja Pengharapan ("Church of the Favor of God") stood on Sam Ratulangi Road, being most active between 1897 and 1905. The mode of the trade was through barter for spices, cassava, salted fish and bird-of-paradise. The society of Numbay, or Tabi in general, was led by an ondoafi (chief of the tribe). By 1849, the Numbay region was a tributary of the Tidore Sultanate.

On 28 September 1909, a detachment of the Dutch navy under Captain F.J.P. Sachse came ashore at Humboldt Bay near the mouth of the Numbay river. Their task was the systematic exploration of northern New Guinea and the search for a natural border between the Dutch and German spheres on New Guinea. Their camp along the river was called Kloofkamp, a name still in use as the name of an old district of Jayapura. Forty coconut trees were cut down for the establishment of the camp. They were bought from the owners at a cost of one rijksdaalder per palm.

On 7 March 1910, the Dutch flag was raised and the settlement was named Hollandia. On the other side of the bay there was already a German camp, Germania-Huk (German Corner), which is now uninhabited and part of Indonesian territory. Hollandia was the capital of a district of the same name in the northeast of West New Guinea. The name Hollandia was used until 1962.

The northern part of Netherlands New Guinea was occupied by Japanese forces in 1942. Allied forces drove out the Japanese after Operations Reckless and Persecution, the amphibious landings near Hollandia, from 21 April 1944. The area's Naval Base Hollandia, served as General Douglas MacArthur's headquarters until the conquest of the Philippines in March 1945. Over twenty U.S. bases were established and half a million US personnel moved through the area.

In mid-January 1960, 29-year-old Australian ocean rower and eccentric bushman Michael 'Tarzan' Fomenko was kept in Hollandia by Dutch authorities while they liaised with Australian authorities on what to do with him. Fomenko had arrived in Dutch New Guinea in December 1959 in a dugout canoe which he had paddled from Queensland through the Torres Strait for some months prior.

Jayapura was struck by the Aitape tsunami after the 1998 Papua New Guinea earthquake.

== Geography and climate ==
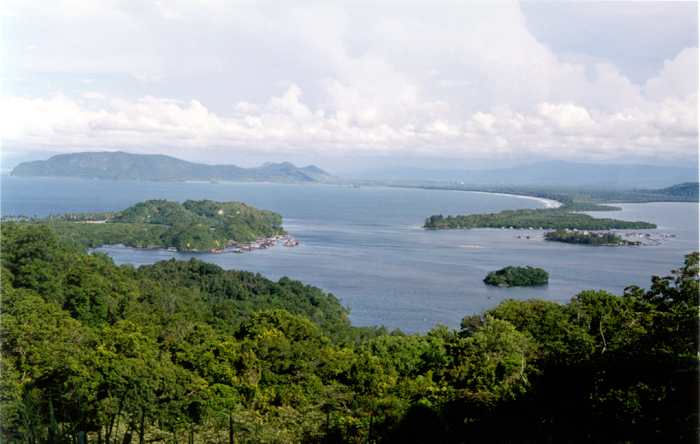
Looking east to Yos Sudarso Bay, showing the floating village of Tobati (left) and Engros (right), just to the south of Jayapura.

The topography of Jayapura varies from valleys to hills, plateaus, and mountains up to 700 metres (2,300 ft) above sea level. Jayapura overlooks the Yos Sudarso Bay. Jayapura is about 83,548 hectares (206,450 acres) in land area, and is divided into five districts. Around 30% of the area is inhabited, with the remainder consisting of a rough terrain, swamps, and protected forest.

The district of Muara Tami, which covers the eastern half (52.4%) of the city's area, up to the national border with Papua New Guinea, is relatively unpopulated with only 4.6% of the population, and serves as an outlet for the Tami River ("Muara Tami" means "mouth of the Tami") and other rivers originating in Keerom Regency to the south and emptying into the Pacific to the north. It comprises the administrative villages of Holtekam (in the northwest and thus closest to the urban area of Jayapura city), Kampung Mosso (in the east, bordering on Papua New Guinea), Koya Barat, Koya Tengah, Koya Timur, Skow Mabo, Skow Sae and Skow Yambe, of which Koya Barat and Koya Timur have the status of urban kelurahan and the others are classed as rural desa.

Jayapura has a tropical rainforest climate (Af) with heavy rainfall year-round.

Climate data for Jayapura (2000–2020)
Month	Jan	Feb	Mar	Apr	May	Jun	Jul	Aug	Sep	Oct	Nov	Dec	Year
Mean daily maximum °C (°F)	32.2 (90.0)	32.1 (89.8)	32.1 (89.8)	32.4 (90.3)	32.4 (90.3)	31.9 (89.4)	31.6 (88.9)	32.0 (89.6)	32.2 (90.0)	32.8 (91.0)	32.6 (90.7)	32.4 (90.3)	32.2 (90.0)
Mean daily minimum °C (°F)	23.9 (75.0)	23.8 (74.8)	24.0 (75.2)	24.0 (75.2)	24.0 (75.2)	23.8 (74.8)	23.5 (74.3)	23.5 (74.3)	23.4 (74.1)	23.8 (74.8)	23.9 (75.0)	24.1 (75.4)	23.8 (74.8)
Average precipitation mm (inches)	178.5 (7.03)	224.6 (8.84)	222.9 (8.78)	168.5 (6.63)	188.0 (7.40)	148.6 (5.85)	103.2 (4.06)	129.6 (5.10)	143.8 (5.66)	104.7 (4.12)	144.5 (5.69)	156.7 (6.17)	1,913.6 (75.33)
Average precipitation days	11.9	12.3	13.0	11.9	9.3	9.6	8.8	9.4	8.7	9.4	11.1	12.3	127.7
Source: Meteomanz

== Administrative districts ==
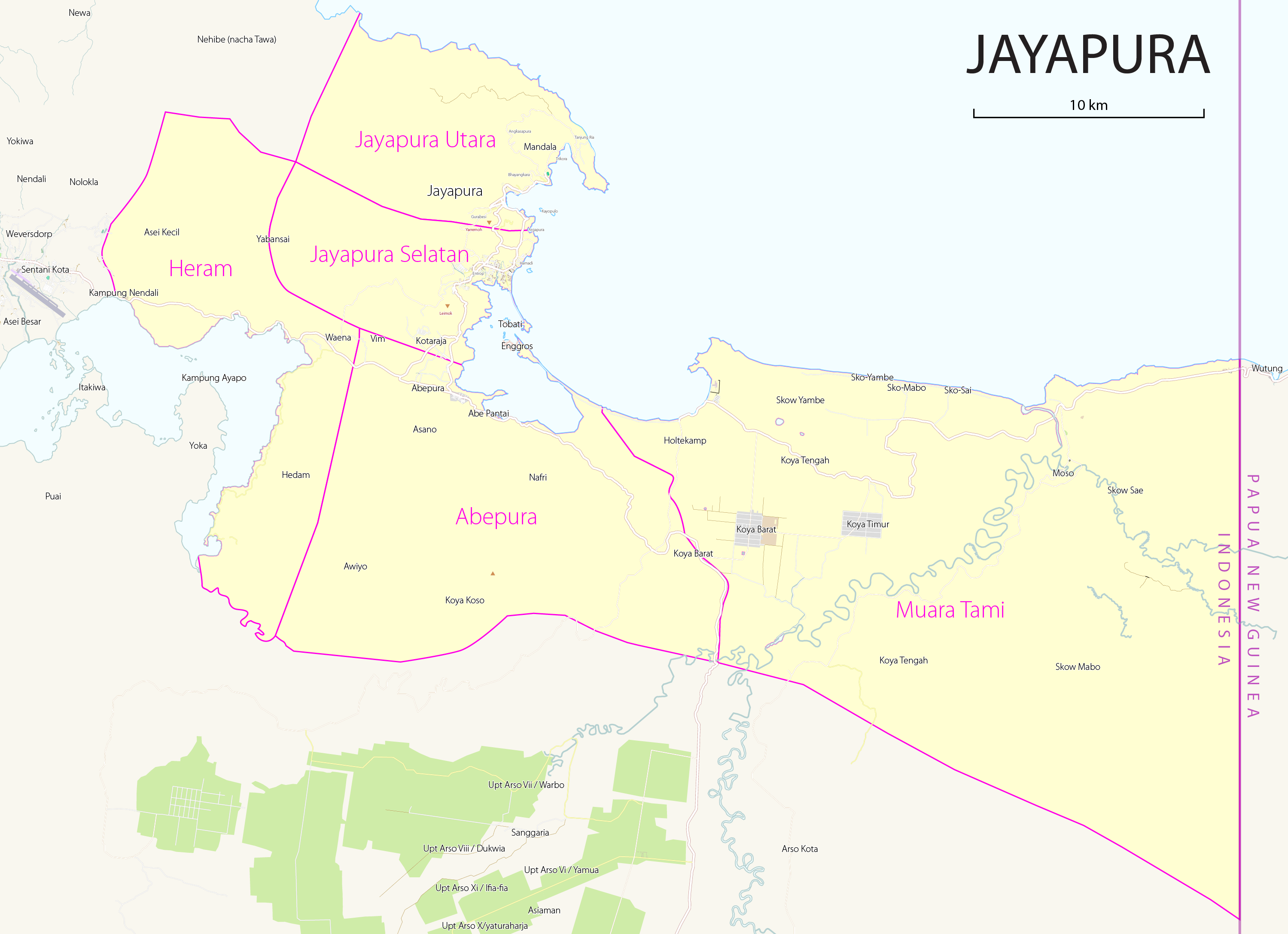
Districts (distrik) of Jayapura

The city comprises five districts (distrik), tabulated below with their areas and their populations at the 2010 Census and the 2020 Census, together with the official estimates as of mid 2024. The table also lists the locations of the district headquarters, the number of administrative villages in each district (totaling 25 urban kelurahan and 14 rural kampung), and its post codes.

Kode Wilayah	Name of District (distrik)	Area in km^{2}	Pop'n 2010 Census	Pop'n 2020 Census^{(a)}	Pop'n mid 2024 Estimate	Admin centre	No. of kelurahan	No. of kampung	Post codes
91.71.04	Muara Tami	438.02	11,137	13,325	18,803	Skouw Mabo	2	6	99311–99318
91.71.03	Abepura	245.85	73,157	86,251	126,690	Kota Baru	8	3	99321–99329
91.71.05	Heram	40.64	40,435	47,532	69,661	Waena	3	2	99311–99314
91.71.02	Jayapura Selatan (South Jayapura)	43.86	66,937	79,554	101,403	Entrop	5	2	99220–99229
91.71.01	Jayapura Utara (North Jayapura)	67.11	65,039	77,098	94,295	Tanjung Ria	7	1	99111–99118
	Jayapura Totals	835.48	256,705	303,760	410,852		25	14	

Note: (a) the original 2020 Census figures were quoted as 303,760; this was drastically revised to 398,478, but the figures for the individual five districts have not been revised.

== Demographics ==
As the capital of Papua Province, Jayapura City has seen a large number for citizens migrating from other regions of Indonesia. Ethnic Javanese, Sundanese, Makasar, Buginese, Torajanese, Manadonese, Bataks, Moluccans, Madurese and so on, among others ethnicities of the nation that caused a sizeable increase in the population over the last decade. The city has also seen many students coming in for higher education from various parts of the province.

=== Religion ===
Religion in Jayapura (2023)
1. Christianity (55.8%)
2. Islam (43.8%)
3. Buddhism (0.27%)
4. Hinduism (0.17%)

On 12 May 1949, the Roman Catholic Apostolic Prefecture of Hollandia was established in the city. In 1963, it was renamed as the Apostolic Vicariate of Kota Baru. In 1964, it was again renamed as the Apostolic Vicariate of Sukarnapura. It was promoted in 1966 as the Diocese of Sukarnapura, renamed in 1969 as the Diocese of Djajapura and since 1973 spelled as Diocese of Jayapura.

== Economy ==
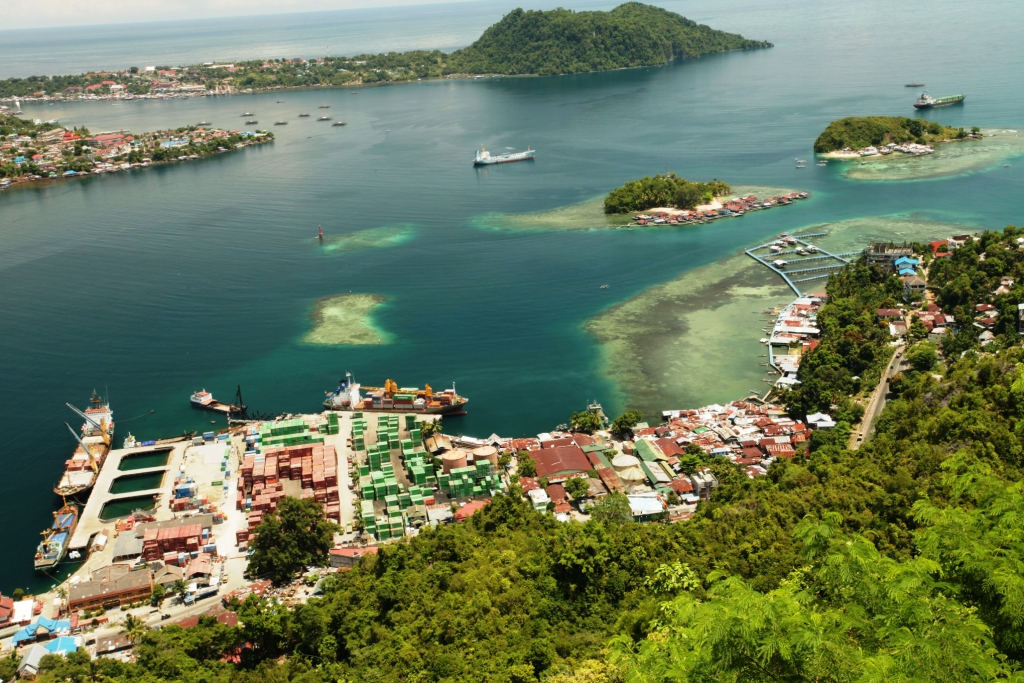
Jayapura port activities around Jayapura Bay, 2011

The highest economic growth of Jayapura city compared to other districts/municipalities in the province of Papua has had implications for the increased income and purchasing power of the people. The economic growth is largely contributed from the tertiary sector, where trade and services and finance dominate its contribution to the formation of GRDP.

The sharp gap/disparity of income, and the high rate of poverty (28.44% at less than $3.10/day PPP) and unemployment rate with low labor force participation rate (57.26%). Another weakness is the not yet optimal use of agriculture (in the broad sense) as one of the supporters of the regional economy that has a competitive advantage. Tourism developments, marked by the growing tourism industry and domestic and foreign tourist arrivals in Jayapura City, have provided opportunities for various sectors to flourish, especially income generation for the indigenous people of Port Numbay in Jayapura city.

With the development of trade and service activities supported by the increasing availability of trade and service facilities that lead to increased private investment in the trade and tourism services sector and other sectors. This condition also needs to be supported by the protection policy for the indigenous people of Port Numbay to be prioritized in taking the opportunity to compete healthily, especially in the field of trade, investment and tourism sector.

The economic condition of the indigenous people of Port Numbay, particularly in the context of economic competition in the city of Jayapura, is still at a low level with the lack of capital and skills possessed and with increasingly depleted natural resources.

Due to a reliance on subsistence economy skills and knowledge, such as sago concocting abilities and sea fishing, some indigenous people of Port Numbay have been left behind economically, when compared to other ethnic groups from Jayapura City. These other ethnic groups rely on the more profitable trade and service economic model, which profits off of the subsistence economy. However, by using the customary rights area along the coast, which serves as a tourist destination, some inhabitants of Port Numbay Original have competed in the service sector on a small scale with limited capital.This is done by indigenous villagers Kayu Batu on Base-G beach in North Jayapura, Hamadi beach in South Jayapura and on Holtekam beach, Skow Mabo and Skow in Muara Tami district.

While competition in the field of trade is still limited to the natives of Port Numbay because it is still in small scale and is subsistence economy. Among other things, the sale of crops such as marine fish, long-term crops such as coconut, areca nut and others that more levels of economic competition with other ethnic Jayapura in the same merchandise, and with a larger scale.

== Transport ==
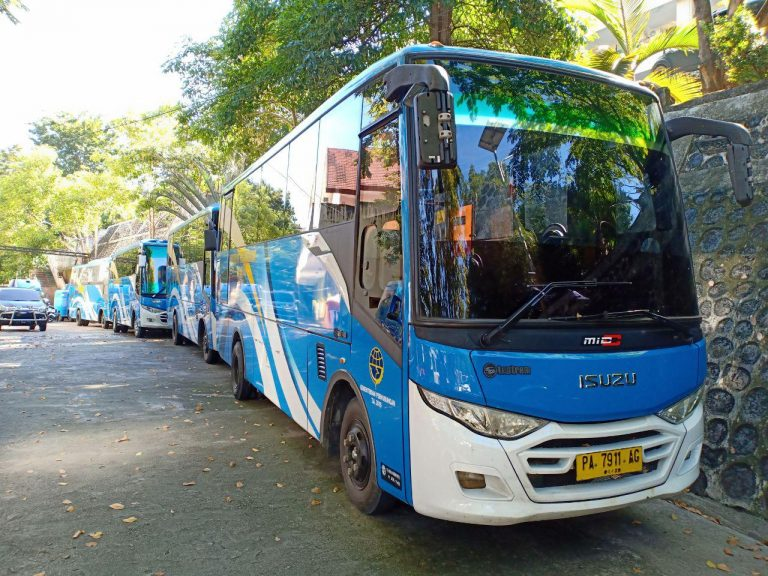
Transmetro Jayapura buses

Jayapura is served by Sentani International Airport, located at Sentani town in Jayapura Regency some 40 km west of the city, and near Lake Sentani.

A highway connects the city eastwards to Skouw, a village near the border with Papua New Guinea and continues beyond the border to Vanimo. The city has connection to other towns and cities such as Sarmi and Wamena via the Trans-Papua Highway.

Bus terminals in Jayapura include Terminal Entrop and Terminal Mesran. Trans Jayapura bus rapid transit, operated by the city government via Pikoum cooperative, is operating within the city since 2019 with four corridors starting from both terminals.

The government is currently planning to build a railway from Jayapura to Sarmi, a distance of some 400 km. Further plans could subsequently extend this to connect Jayapura with Manokwari and Sorong. The project is planned for completion by 2030.

== Sport ==
Jayapura is the home of the Persipura, a professional football club that has produced many famous Papuan-Indonesian footballers and have won the Liga Indonesia/Indonesia Super League four times in the 2005, 2008–09, 2010–11 and the 2012–13 seasons. Persipura plays its home matches in the Mandala Stadium as well as Hollandia Rugby Club Jayapura.

== Media ==
The main newspaper in Papua, Cenderawasih Pos, is published in Jayapura. Other notable local newspaper and online media such as Koran Jubi is also based in the city.

Jayapura also served by several radio and television station, including public stations RRI Jayapura and TVRI Papua as well as privately owned Jaya TV. Most national television networks coverage could be received in the city.

== Twin towns and sister cities ==
Jayapura's sister cities are:

- Vanimo, Papua New Guinea

== See also ==
- Cenderawasih University
- Sentani Airport
