= Ceylonese rixdollar =

Erstwhile currency of British Ceylon

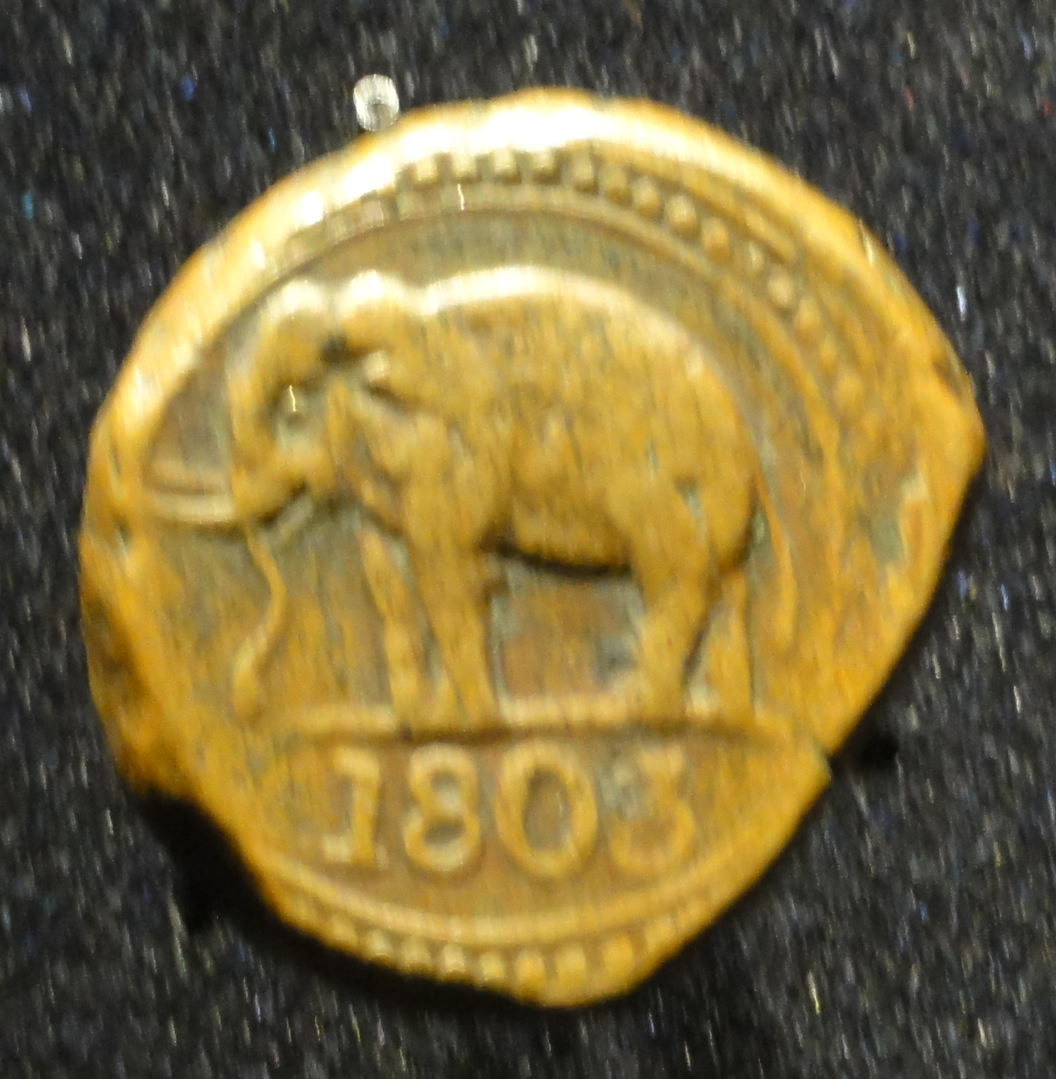
Copper 4-stiver coin, 1803

The rixdollar was the currency of British Ceylon until 1828. It was subdivided into 48 stivers, each of 4 duit. Units called the fanam and larin were also used, worth 4 and 9½ stiver, respectively. The currency derived from the Dutch rijksdaalder and stuiver, although the rijksdaalder was worth 50 stuiver.

Initially containing over 25 grams fine silver worth 4 shillings and sixpence in the 17th century, the rixdollar was debased several times so that it was worth just one-third this amount by the 19th century. In 1825 it was replaced by sterling coin at a rate of 1 rixdollar = 1 1/2 shillings, less than the Indian rupee which was worth about 1 11/12 shillings.

== Coins ==
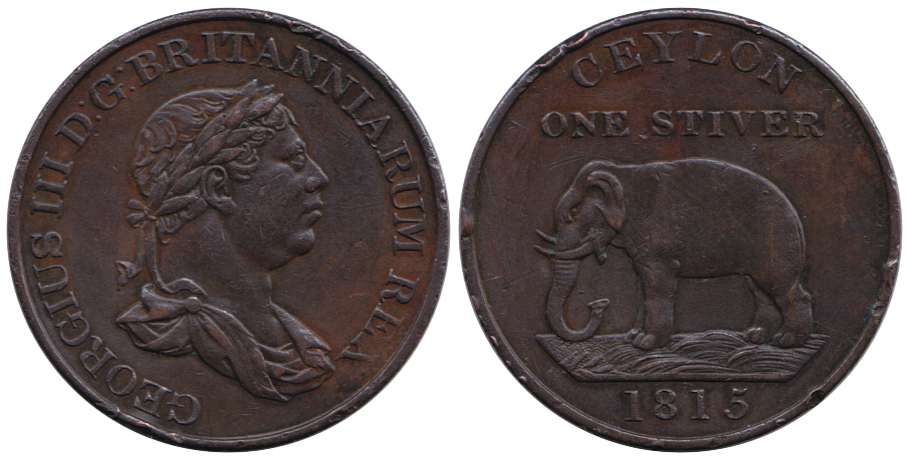
Copper one stiver coin, 1815

The Netherlands United East India Company (VOC) issued coins during the 18th century in denominations of 1/8 and 1 duit, 1/4, 1, 2 and 4 3/4 stuiver and 1 rixdollar.

After the British took over Ceylon, dump coins (crudely struck copper pieces) were introduced in 1801 in denominations of 1/48, 1/24 and 1/12 rixdollar. In 1802, milled, copper coins for 1/192, 1/96 and 1/48 rixdollar were added, although the dump coins continued to be produced until 1816. Silver coins were introduced in 1803 for 24, 48 and 96 stivers.

In 1815, copper 1/2, 1 and 2 stuiver coins were issued, equal in value to the 1/96, 1/48 and 1/24 rixdollar denominations. Silver rixdollar coins were issued in 1821.

== Banknotes ==
The Government of Ceylon issued notes denominated in rixdollars, including 5 rixdollar notes in 1809 and 2 rixdollars in 1826.

== Notes ==
- Krause, Chester L.; Clifford Mishler (1978). Standard Catalog of World Coins: 1979 Edition. Colin R. Bruce II (senior editor) (5th ed.). Krause Publications. ISBN 0873410203.
- Pick, Albert (1994). Bruce, Colin R. II; Shafer, Neil (eds.). Standard Catalog of World Paper Money: General Issues (7th ed.). Krause Publications. ISBN 0-87341-207-9.
