= Youtefa Bridge =

Bridge in Jayapura, Indonesia

Youtefa Bridge Jembatan Youtefa
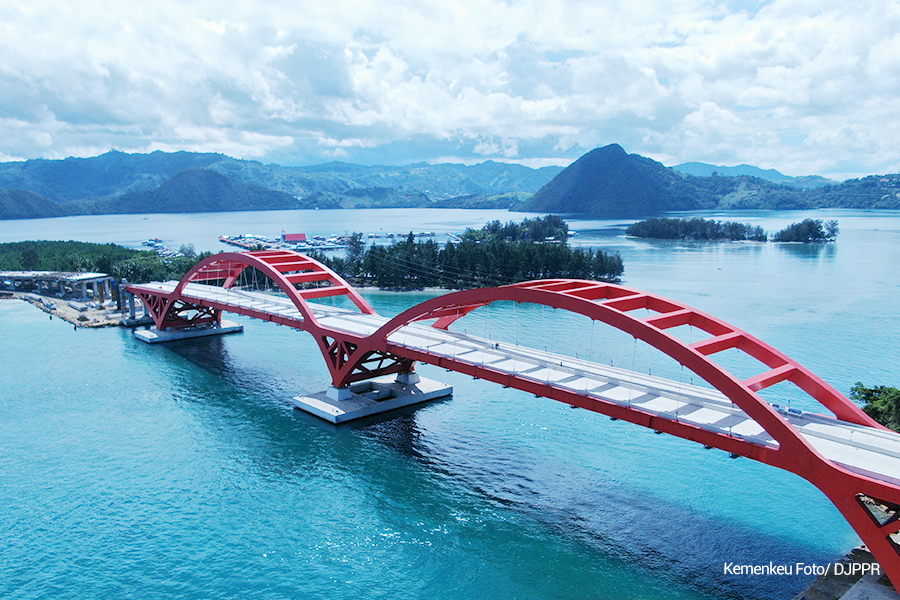
- The bridge in 2019
- Coordinates: 2°35′42″S 140°42′48″E
- Carries: Vehicles
- Crosses: Youtefa Bay
- Locale: Jayapura, Indonesia
- Other name: Holtekamp Bridge (former name)

Characteristics
- Design: Tied-arch bridge
- Total length: 732 metres (2,402 ft)
- Width: 21 metres (69 ft)
- Height: 20 metres (66 ft)
- Longest span: 150 metres (492 ft)

History
- Constructed by: • PT Pembangunan Perumahan (Persero) (leader) • PT Hutama Karya (Persero) • PT Nindya Karya (Persero)
- Fabrication by: PAL Indonesia
- Construction start: May 2015; 11 years ago
- Construction cost: IDR 1.87 trillion
- Inaugurated: 28 October 2019; 6 years ago

Location
- Interactive map of Youtefa Bridge

Youtefa Bridge (previously Holtekamp Bridge) is a steel arch type bridge over Youtefa Bay, Jayapura, Papua, Indonesia that connects Holtekamp in Muara Tami District with Hamadi in Jayapura Selatan District. The bridge cut the distance and travel time from Jayapura city center to Muara Tami District as well as Skouw State Border Post at Indonesia–Papua New Guinea border.

== History ==
The bridge construction was carried out by consortium of state-owned construction companies PT Pembangunan Perumahan Tbk, PT Hutama Karya (Persero), and PT Nindya Karya (Persero), with a total construction cost of IDR 1.87 trillion and support from the Ministry of Public Works and Housing worth IDR 1.3 trillion. The main span assembly of the Youtefa Bridge was not carried out at the bridge site, but at PAL Indonesia shipyard in Surabaya, East Java. Its production in Surabaya aims to improve safety aspects, enhance welding quality, and speed up the implementation time to 3 months. This is the first time where the arch bridge is made elsewhere and then brought to the location.

From Surabaya the bridge span, weighing 2000 tons and 112.5 m long, was sent by ship with a 3,200 kilometers journey in 19 days. Installation of the first span was carried out on February 21, 2018, while the second span was installed on March 15, 2018 with an installation time of about 6 hours. The bridge was inaugurated on 28 October 2019 by President Joko Widodo.

== Records ==
The Indonesian World Records Museum gave two records for the Youtefa Bridge construction project, namely the record for the delivery of a complete steel frame bridge with the furthest distance, and the record for the installation of the longest intact steel frame bridge.
