= Trans Jayapura =

Busway in Jayapura, Indonesia

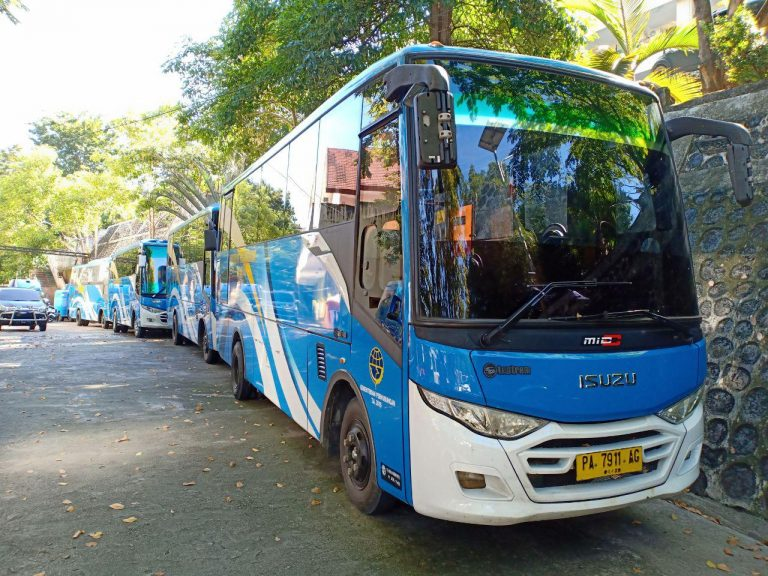

Overview
- Area served: Jayapura and Jayapura Regency
- Locale: Jayapura, Papua, Indonesia
- Transit type: Bus Rapid Transit
- Line number: 4 operational
- Number of stations: 4

Operation
- Began operation: 18 December 2019
- Number of vehicles: 5 units as of 2019

Trans Jayapura or Trans Metro Jayapura is a bus rapid transit (BRT) system in Jayapura city of Papua, Indonesia. Bus vehicles was received by city government since 2017, but the system was not operational until 2019. There are four routes: Terminal Mesran – Angkasa, Terminal Mesran – Pasir II, Terminal Entrop – Terminal Batas Kota (City Border) Waena, and Terminal Entrop – Terminal Skouw Perbatasan (Borders, to Indonesia-Papua New Guinea border post). In 2020, Ministry of Transportation lent the city government 200 units of bus for National Sports Week, which after the event would be taken back. As of 2019, the price of the ticket is IDR 3.500.

== Routes ==
Corridor	Route
1	Terminal Mesran – Angkasa
2	Terminal Mesran – Pasir II
3	Terminal Entrop – Terminal Batas Kota Waena
4	Terminal Entrop – Terminal Skouw Perbatasan
