= Top TV Network =

Top TV Network is brand of a network of 5 television stations in East Indonesia. The name Top TV Papua is a former name of Jaya TV Jayapura; local television station based in Jayapura, Papua which launched on February 5, 2007.

Top TV Papua is led by Dr. M. Yohanis Koroh, as President Director. In 2014, Top TV Papua merged with Jaya TV Manokwari into Jaya TV Jayapura.
