= Cenderawasih Pos =

Indonesian daily newspaper published in Jayapura

- Harian Pertama dan Terbesar di Papua (The First and Largest Daily in Papua)
- Type: Daily newspaper
- Format: Broadsheet
- Owner(s): Jawa Pos Group
- Founded: October 28, 1962; 62 years ago
- Language: Indonesian
- Headquarters: Graha Pena Papua Building; Jl. Balai Kota No. 07 Entrop, Jayapura, Papua
- City: Jayapura
- Country: Indonesia
- OCLC number: 920824404
- Website: www.ceposonline.com

Cenderawasih Pos (The Cenderawasih Post) is a daily newspaper published in Jayapura, Indonesia. The paper is the major paper of Jayapura and Papua province. It is owned by Jawa Pos Group and become a part of Jawa Pos News Network (JPNN).

Cenderawasih Pos was first published as SKM Cenderawasih on 28 October 1962; "SKM" itself means Surat Kabar Mingguan (weekly newspaper), indicating its periodical type. On 1 March 1993, Jawa Pos Group bought the paper, slightly changed its name and turned the paper into a daily publication. Since 2018, Cenderawasih Pos began its online presence.
