= Duit =

Dutch coin

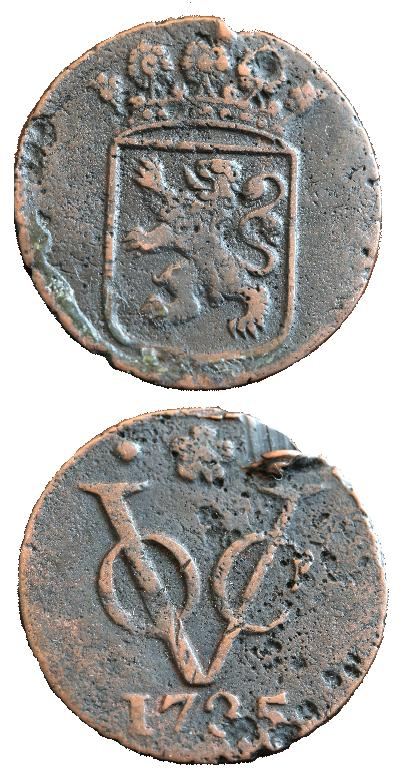
Copper duit coin from 1735, with the VOC monogram on the obverse and the crowned coat of arms of the Province of Holland on the reverse.

The duit (pronounced [ˈdœyt]) (plural: duiten; English: doit) was an old low-value Dutch copper coin. Struck in the 17th and 18th centuries in the territory of the Dutch Republic, it became an international currency. It held significant importance in both Dutch domestic and colonial trade, particularly in the Dutch East Indies (modern-day Indonesia). The coin had the nominal value of 1/8 stuiver.

== Etymology ==
Etymologically, the word duit comes from Middle Dutch and means a type of small coin.

== History ==
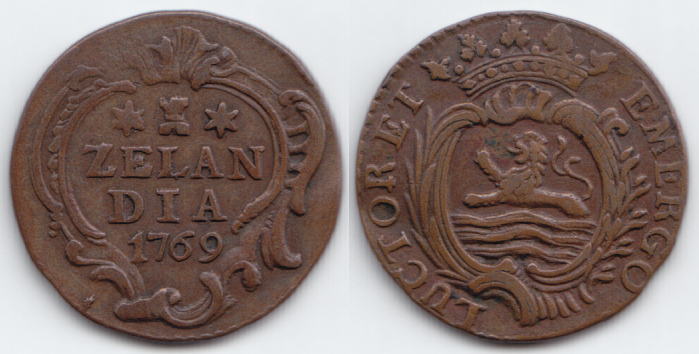
Duit from Zeeland (1769)

The Dutch East India Company (VOC) commissioned a special coin with a monogram engraved on it in order to prevent smuggling. The coin was first minted during the 17th century in the Dutch Republic and was issued in the Netherlands until the year 1816, when it was replaced by cents and ½ cents. Later it became an internationalized currency and was also issued in the Dutch East Indies, Dutch Ceylon, and Dutch Malabar. Only these types of coins were valid for use in colonial-era Indonesia, where it was issued by the Dutch East India Company from the beginning till the end of the 18th century. The biggest destination for duit coins was Java. The duit was also used in parts of the Americas while under Dutch rule, such as New Amsterdam (present-day New York City) and Suriname, and in Africa in the Dutch Cape Colony.

The coin's name was preserved in the Netherlands for a long time as vierduitstuk (or 'plak'), because it was worth 4 duiten = half a stuiver (or 2½ cents).

== Nominal value ==
According to its usage in the Netherlands, 8 duiten are equivalent to a stuiver and 160 duiten are equivalent to a guilder. When this value was applied in the Dutch East Indies colony in 1726, it was equivalent to a quarter of a stuiver (i.e. 4 duit = 1 stuiver).

== Weight and composition ==
Weight

Various standards existed, with official weights of:

- 4.24 grams from 1590
- 3.93 grams in later periods

Composition

Originally duit coins were minted in copper, but proof coinage of the duit was also minted in silver and gold.

== Dutch expressions ==
The Dutch language has many expressions, proverbs and sayings which feature the word duit, including:

- "Putting a doit in the bag" (Een duit in het zakje doen) – to contribute a little something
- "He is a doit-thief." (Hij is een duitendief) – he is a miser.
- "He has a lot of kaka, but not many doits." (Hij heeft veel kak, maar weinig duiten) – he is a braggart.
- "To have courage like a three-doit haddock" (Moed hebben als een schelvis van drie duiten) – to be cowardly
- "To give someone four doits back" (Iemand van vier duiten weerom geven) – to tell someone the truth

== Legacy ==
As the monetary unit was widespread throughout the Malay archipelago, the word duit eventually was absorbed into Malay vocabulary becoming a synonym for 'money' besides wang (Malaysian spelling) and uang (Indonesian spelling). Malaysia's own national contactless payment system is named DuitNow.

The Duit is also used in Dutch India making Duttu (துட்டு) a slang for low denomination money in Tamil.

The duit is also referred to as the "New York penny" due to its use as a Colonial monetary unit in Dutch New Amsterdam (later New York) and for years later, long after Dutch rule had passed.

The Duit circulated also in the duchy of Cleves and Guelders, which may be the reason why in the 18th century the expression kein Deut entered the German language, meaning not a bit.

== Bibliography ==
- Shimada, Ryūto (2006). The Intra-Asian Trade in Japanese Copper by the Dutch East India Company During the Eighteenth Century. Leiden: Brill. ISBN 90-04-15092-7. Archived from the original on 2024-02-08.
