= Dutch rijksdaalder =

Historical coin

Rijksdaalder (1622)

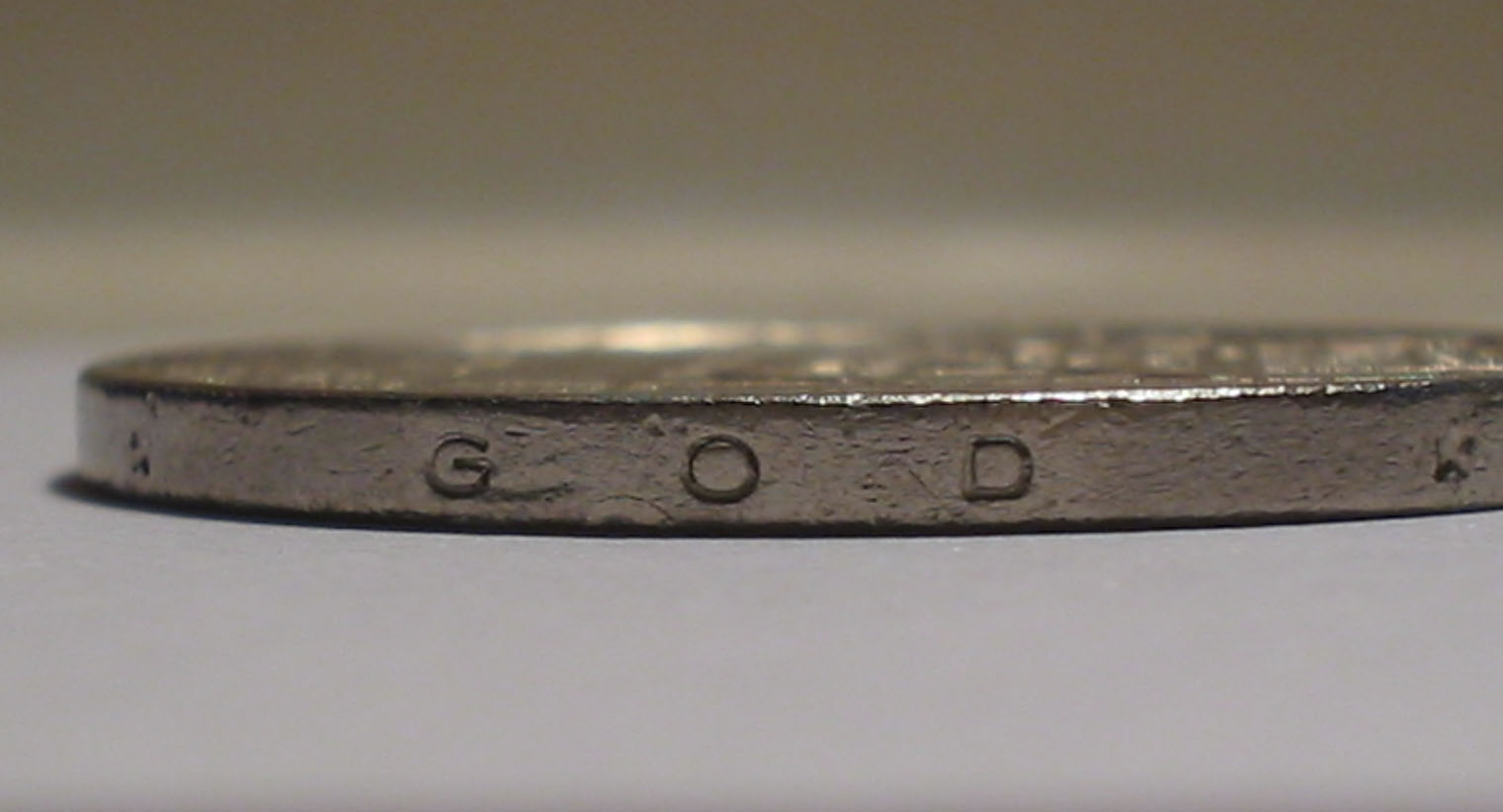
The phrase God zij met ons on the edge of a rijksdaalder

The rijksdaalder (Dutch pronunciation: [rɛiksˈdaːldər]; "Imperial dollar") was a Dutch coin first issued by the Republic of the Seven United Netherlands in the late 16th century during the Dutch Revolt which featured an armored half bust of William the Silent. It was the Dutch counterpart of the Reichsthaler of the Holy Roman Empire (weighing 29.232 grams of 0.889 fine silver) but weighed slightly less, at 29.03 g (448 grains) of 0.885 fine silver, reduced to 0.875 fine by the 17th century. Friesland, Gelderland, Holland, Kampen, Overijssel, Utrecht, West Friesland, Zeeland, and Zwolle minted armored half bust rijksdaalders until the end of the 17th century.

17th century rijksdaalder was set to be equal to from 48 to 50 stuivers (the Dutch equivalent of shillings) and circulated along with silver florins (28 stuivers), daalders (30 stuivers), leeuwendaalders (36 to 42 stuivers; 27.68 g, 0.743 fine), silver ducats (48 stuivers; 28.06 g, 0.868 fine), and ducatons (60 stuivers; 32.46 g, 0.938 fine) silver ducats and rijksdaalders were almost of the same size and quality. With the disappearance of the original armored half bust rijksdaalder design, silver ducats and later 2 1/2 guilders started to be called rijksdaalders.

Unification of the Dutch monetary system in the beginning of the 18th century introduced guilder and set rijksdaalders and silver ducats at 2 1/2 guilders. Following decimalization (in 1816), 2 1/2-guilder coins were no longer produced because a 3-guilder coin was thought to better fit in the series of denominations. This turned out to be a mistake (due to the high silver price) and from 1840 onward 2 1/2-guilder coins were produced again. Production stopped in 2002 due to the introduction of the euro. 2 1/2-guilder coins continued to be called by their nicknames rijksdaalder, riks, and knaak until the introduction of the euro.

The Royal Dutch Mint still mints a silver ducat "rijksdaalder" to this day.

== Mintage since 1840 ==
These are mintage figures for the 2 1/2-guilder denomination until introduction of the euro in 2002. It excludes the silver ducat which is still minted as a numismatic product even after 2002.

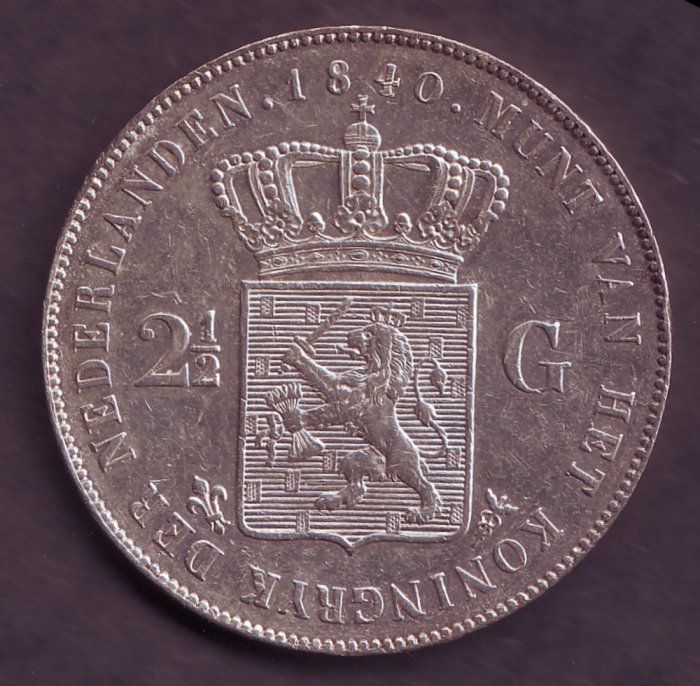
The first rijksdaalder of the Kingdom of the Netherlands, issued in 1840

Year	Mintage	Mint	Mint marks	Monarch	Notes
1840	44,409	Utrecht	Utrecht Mint, privy mark	William I	Diameter: 38mm; silver content: 94.5%
1841	53,542	Utrecht	Utrecht Mint, privy mark	William II	
1842	1,009,807	Utrecht	Utrecht Mint, privy mark	William II	
1843	642,659	Utrecht	Utrecht Mint, privy mark	William II	
1844	278,535	Utrecht	Utrecht Mint, privy mark	William II	
1845	3,928,381	Utrecht	Utrecht Mint, privy mark	William II	
1846	3,629,712	Utrecht	Utrecht Mint, privy mark	William II	
1847	9,465,005	Utrecht	Utrecht Mint, privy mark	William II	
1848	8,333,000	Utrecht	Utrecht Mint, privy mark	William II	
1849	2,049,000	Utrecht	Utrecht Mint, privy mark	William II	
1849	439,307	Utrecht	Utrecht Mint, privy mark	William III	
1850	5,008,210	Utrecht	Utrecht Mint, privy mark	William III	
1851	3,647,493	Utrecht	Utrecht Mint, privy mark	William III	
1852	4,547,764	Utrecht	Utrecht Mint, privy mark	William III	
1853	234,128	Utrecht	Utrecht Mint, privy mark	William III	
1854	4,334,526	Utrecht	Utrecht Mint, privy mark	William III	
1855	2,082,046	Utrecht	Utrecht Mint, privy mark	William III	
1856	909,345	Utrecht	Utrecht Mint, privy mark	William III	
1857	3,353,072	Utrecht	Utrecht Mint, privy mark	William III	
1858	8,357,486	Utrecht	Utrecht Mint, privy mark	William III	
1859	4,306,594	Utrecht	Utrecht Mint, privy mark	William III	
1860	847,104	Utrecht	Utrecht Mint, privy mark	William III	
1861	876,003	Utrecht	Utrecht Mint, privy mark	William III	
1862	3,304,118	Utrecht	Utrecht Mint, privy mark	William III	
1863	50,652	Utrecht	Utrecht Mint, privy mark	William III	
1864	2,033,644	Utrecht	Utrecht Mint, privy mark	William III	
1865	2,287,612	Utrecht	Utrecht Mint, privy mark	William III	
1866	3,652,608	Utrecht	Utrecht Mint, privy mark	William III	
1867	4,984,886	Utrecht	Utrecht Mint, privy mark	William III	
1868	4,040,021	Utrecht	Utrecht Mint, privy mark	William III	
1869	5,046,192	Utrecht	Utrecht Mint, privy mark	William III	
1870	6,639,847	Utrecht	Utrecht Mint, privy mark	William III	
1871	6,875,035	Utrecht	Utrecht Mint, privy mark	William III	
1872	13,416,378	Utrecht	Utrecht Mint, privy mark	William III	
1873	5,515,073	Utrecht	Utrecht Mint, privy mark	William III	
1874	12,795,726	Utrecht	Utrecht Mint, privy mark	William III	
1875–1897: No rijksdaalders minted				William III	
1898	100,000	Utrecht	Utrecht Mint, privy mark	Wilhelmina	
1899–1928: No rijksdaalders minted				Wilhelmina	
1929	4,400,000	Utrecht	Utrecht Mint, privy mark	Wilhelmina	Silver content reduced to 72.0%
1930	11,600,000	Utrecht	Utrecht Mint, privy mark	Wilhelmina	
1931	4,720,000	Utrecht	Utrecht Mint, privy mark	Wilhelmina	
1932	6,000,000	Utrecht	Utrecht Mint, privy mark	Wilhelmina	
1933	3,560,000	Utrecht	Utrecht Mint, privy mark	Wilhelmina	
1934–1936: No rijksdaalders minted				Wilhelmina	
1937	4,000,000	Utrecht	Utrecht Mint, privy mark	Wilhelmina	
1938	2,000,000	Utrecht	Utrecht Mint, privy mark	Wilhelmina	
1939	3,760,000	Utrecht	Utrecht Mint, privy mark	Wilhelmina	
1940	4,640,000	Utrecht	Utrecht Mint, privy mark	Wilhelmina	
1941–1942: No rijksdaalders minted				Wilhelmina	
1943	2,000,000	Denver	Letter D, privy mark	Wilhelmina	
1944–1958: No rijksdaalders minted				Wilhelmina	
1944–1958: No rijksdaalders minted				Juliana	
1959	7,200,000	Utrecht	Utrecht Mint, privy mark	Juliana	Diameter reduced to 33mm
1960	12,800,000	Utrecht	Utrecht Mint, privy mark	Juliana	
1961	10,000,000	Utrecht	Utrecht Mint, privy mark	Juliana	
1962	5,000,000	Utrecht	Utrecht Mint, privy mark	Juliana	
1963	4,000,000	Utrecht	Utrecht Mint, privy mark	Juliana	
1964	2,800,000	Utrecht	Utrecht Mint, privy mark	Juliana	
1965: No rijksdaalders minted				Juliana	
1966	5,000,000	Utrecht	Utrecht Mint, privy mark	Juliana	
1967–1968: No rijksdaalders minted				Juliana	
1969	15,720,000	Utrecht	Utrecht Mint, privy mark	Juliana	Silver content removed. Diameter reduced to 29mm
1970	22,000,000	Utrecht	Utrecht Mint, privy mark	Juliana	
1971	8,000,000	Utrecht	Utrecht Mint, privy mark	Juliana	
1972	20,000,000	Utrecht	Utrecht Mint, privy mark	Juliana	
1973–1977: No rijksdaalders minted				Juliana	
1978	5,000,000	Utrecht	Utrecht Mint, privy mark	Juliana	
1979	5,000,000	Utrecht	Utrecht Mint, privy mark	Juliana	Union of Utrecht circulating commemorative
1980	37,300,000	Utrecht	Utrecht Mint, privy mark	Juliana	
1980	30,500,000	Utrecht	Utrecht Mint, privy mark	Beatrix and Juliana	Abdication circulating commemorative
1981: No rijksdaalders minted				Beatrix	
1982	14,300,000	Utrecht	Utrecht Mint, privy mark	Beatrix	
1983	3,800,000	Utrecht	Utrecht Mint, privy mark	Beatrix	
1984	5,200,000	Utrecht	Utrecht Mint, privy mark	Beatrix	
1985	3,100,000	Utrecht	Utrecht Mint, privy mark	Beatrix	
1986	5,800,000	Utrecht	Utrecht Mint, privy mark	Beatrix	
1987	2,500,000	Utrecht	Utrecht Mint, privy mark	Beatrix	
1988	6,800,000	Utrecht	Utrecht Mint, privy mark	Beatrix	
1989	4,000,000	Utrecht	Utrecht Mint, privy mark	Beatrix	
1990	1,000,000	Utrecht	Utrecht Mint, privy mark	Beatrix	
1991	400,000	Utrecht	Utrecht Mint, privy mark	Beatrix	
1992	400,000	Utrecht	Utrecht Mint, privy mark	Beatrix	
1993	400,000	Utrecht	Utrecht Mint, privy mark	Beatrix	
1994	420,000	Utrecht	Utrecht Mint, privy mark	Beatrix	
1995	150,000	Utrecht	Utrecht Mint, privy mark	Beatrix	
1996	150,000	Utrecht	Utrecht Mint, privy mark	Beatrix	
1997	180,000	Utrecht	Utrecht Mint, privy mark	Beatrix	
1998	200,000	Utrecht	Utrecht Mint, privy mark	Beatrix	
1999	240,000	Utrecht	Utrecht Mint, privy mark	Beatrix	
2000	300,000	Utrecht	Utrecht Mint, privy mark	Beatrix	
2001	600,000	Utrecht	Utrecht Mint, privy mark	Beatrix	
2002	none	Discontinued due to introduction of the euro.			

== Former colonies ==
The Dutch rijksdaalder and its local 2 1/2-guilder coin (or banknote) counterparts circulated during Indonesia's Dutch colonial period from 1602 until 1949 when it was replaced by the rupiah that would retain the 2½ denomination until 1975 when the last Rp2½ (a banknote issued in 1968) was demonetized. It was locally known as the ringgit.

The Netherlands United East India Company (VOC) issued the rijksdaalder in the Cape Colony in the 17th century. The Dutch monetary system overseas of a rijksdaalder – or rixdollar – of 48 stuiver was continued in the Cape Province by the British in the early nineteenth century.

In Ceylon, the VOC issued coins during the 18th century in denominations of 1/8 and 1 duit, 1/4, 1, 2 and 4 3/4 stuiver and 1 rijksdaalder. The currency derived from the Dutch rijksdaalder, although again the Dutch rijksdaalder was worth 50 stuiver and the Ceylon version 48 stuiver. After the British took over Ceylon and the rixdollar was the currency of Ceylon until 1828. The rixdollar was then replaced by the British pound at a rate of 1 rixdollar = 1 shilling 6 pence (£1 = 13 1/3 rixdollars).

In Suriname, the Surinamese Rijksdaalder circulated until 2004, when the Surinamese guilder was replaced by the Surinamese dollar; the 250-cent coin, however, became revalued to SRD 2.50 and remains in circulation. In the former Netherlands Antilles, the rijksdaalder circulated until 2011: in that year the Netherlands Antillean guilder was replaced by the American dollar in the SABA municipalities, and the Caribbean guilder replaced the Antillean guilder in Curaçao and Sint Maarten in 2025.

Aruba, which still uses their own currency, mints an Aruban ƒ 2 1/2 coin.

== Similar coins ==
The similarly named Reichsthaler, riksdaler and rigsdaler were used in Germany and Austria-Hungary, Sweden, Denmark, and Norway, respectively.
