= Craigie, South Ayrshire =

Coordinates: 55.5595°N 4.4933°W

Craigie
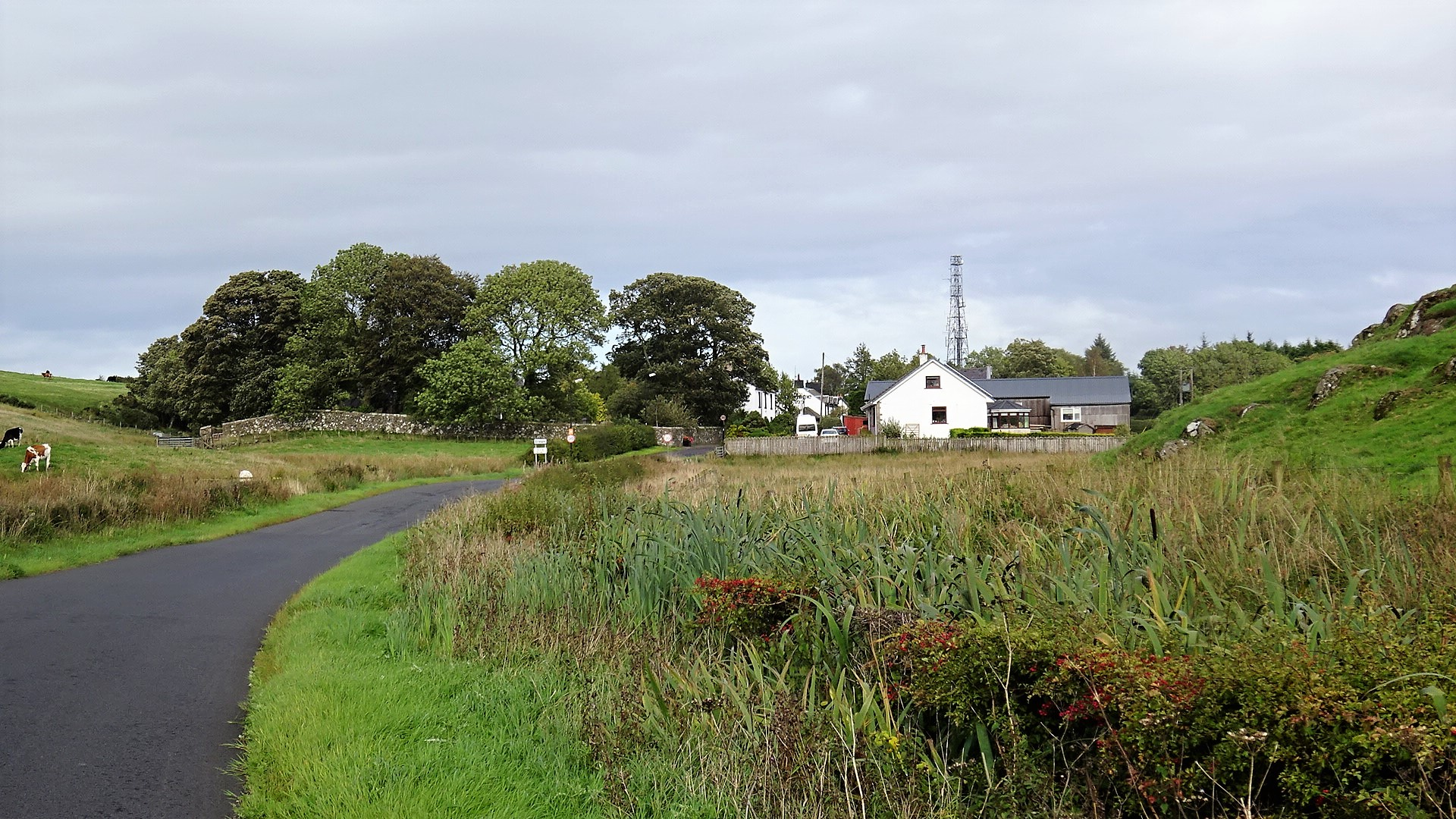
- Craigie Village

- Location within South Ayrshire
- OS grid reference: NS428323
- Council area: South Ayrshire
- Lieutenancy area: Ayrshire and Arran
- Country: Scotland
- Sovereign state: United Kingdom
- Police: Scotland
- Fire: Scottish
- Ambulance: Scottish

Craigie is a small village and parish of 6,579 acres (2,662 hectares) in the old district of Kyle, now South Ayrshire, four miles (six kilometres) south of Kilmarnock, Scotland. This is mainly a farming district, lacking in woodland, with a low population density, and only one village. In the 19th century, high quality lime was quarried here with at least three sites in use in 1832.

== History ==
=== The Church, Manse, and Village ===
The parish of Craigie includes part of the ancient parish of Barnweill, and was itself united to Riccarton until 1647. In 1745, a church is shown on Herman Moll's map of the south part of Ayrshire. William Roy's map of circa 1747 shows the church, the new manse or House of Craigie, above the curling pond and the old manse site, now Lodgebush House. The present church building dates from 1776 and the grounds contain the remains of the 1558 church into which a family memorial has been incorporated.

The 1857 OS map shows a network of footpaths running between the old and new manses, the new manse and the church, the church and Campcastle Farm, etc. The former school of 1874 is shown together with the Craigie Inn, then known as the Red Lion Inn. The village had a post office and the first postmaster is buried in the churchyard. A parish seminary or training college for ministers was established in a new building by the school board in the mid 19th century.

Writing in 1926 William Walls refers to the Annual Agricultural Show that was the social event of the year, a major spectacle being the famous Clydesdales bred by James Kilpatrick of Craigie Mains.

The parish has historically had the lowest population in Ayrshire with 786 in 1801, 779 in 1841, and 470 in 1931.

=== Craigie Castle ===
Craigie Castle in the old Barony of Craigie lies around four miles (six kilometres) southeast of Kilmarnock and 1 mile (1.5 kilometres) southeast of Craigie village. The castle is one of the earliest buildings in the county of Ayrshire. In the 12th century Walter fitz Alan, Steward of Scotland, held these lands and Walter Hose held his fief from the Steward. In 1177 Walter Hose of Cragyn (sic) had given the church of Cragyn to the monks of Paisley. John, probably Walter's son, inherited and his son Thomas had no heir, resulting in his sisters Christiana and Matilda inheriting. Walter de Lyndesay was the son of Christiana, the father being William Lyndesey of Crawfurd. The male line ended with John de Lyndesey, whose daughter married John Wallace of Riccarton.

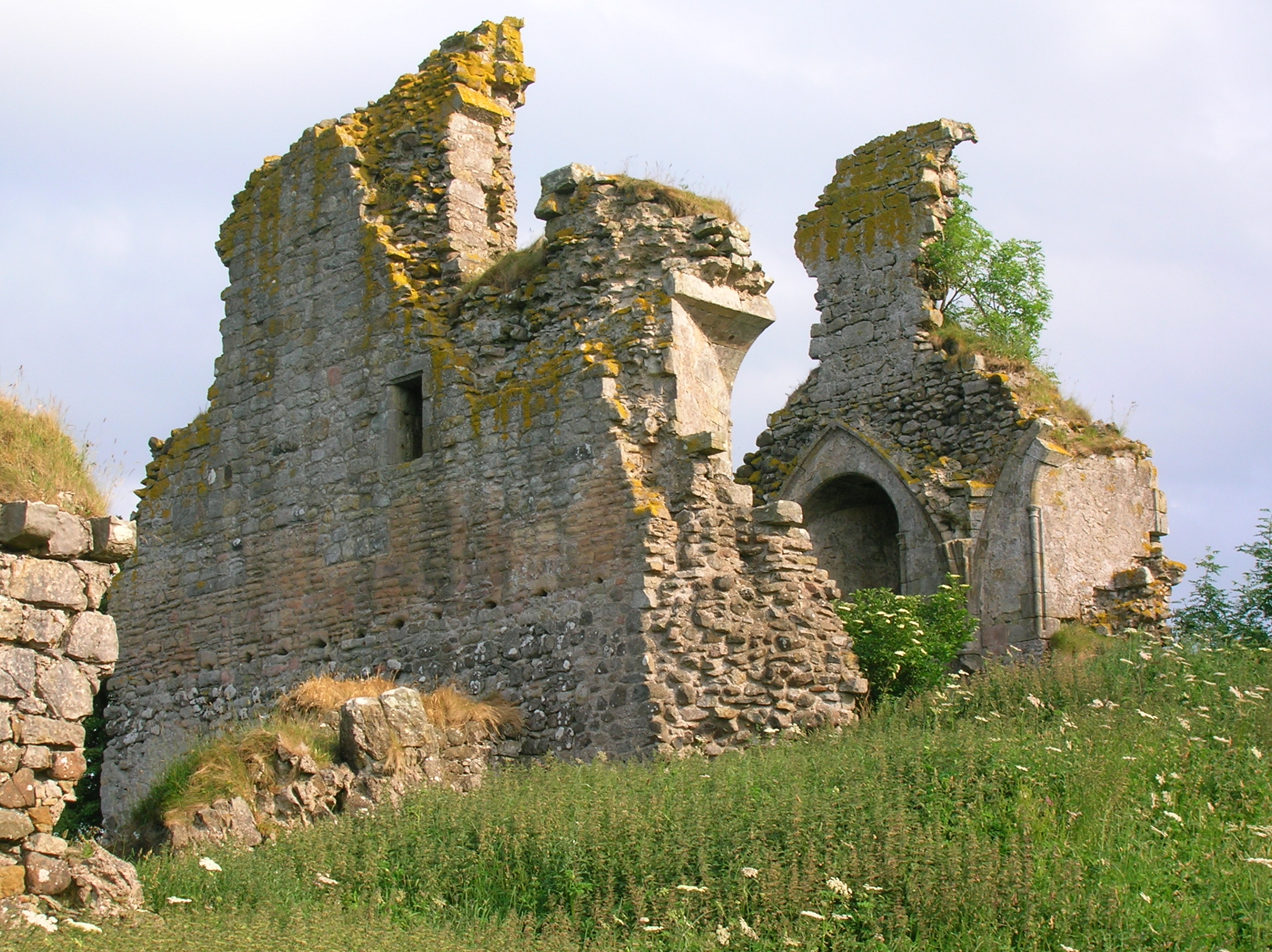
Craigie Castle.

John Wallace of Riccarton in the reign of David II was styled 'Wallayis of Richardtoun'. John married the heiress of Lindsay of Craigie circa 1371 and from this date Craigie was the chief residence of the family. The castle was abandoned and allowed to fall into ruins after 1600. The family moved to their castle at Newton on Ayr and later they built a mansion house on the banks of the River Ayr that they named Craigie.

The Lairds of Craigie cared little for the religious discipline of the presbyterians, and the Laird of Craigie, Sir Hugh Wallace, a supporter of the episcopalian sentiments of Charles I and II, allowed his tenants and servants to work on Sundays and he himself traveled openly upon the Sabbath day. The local ministers wrote to the Laird's local minister, Mr. Inglish, about such open and scandalous breaches of the Sabbath. The Laird ignored the ministers' advice and when he was publicly criticised in church he threw his sword at the minister, the sword sticking in the wood at the back of the pulpit. The minister told the Laird that God will reduce your great stone house to a pile of stones and no one will be able to repair it; and your son, of whom you have great hopes, will die a fool. Soon after the castle was in need of repair and when the stonemasons started work a great part of it fell down and almost buried them all. His son

=== Wallace's Monument ===
Wallace's Monument, Wallace Tower or the Barnweil Monument is a category-A-listed building located on Barnweil Hill (elevation 503 ft or 153 m).

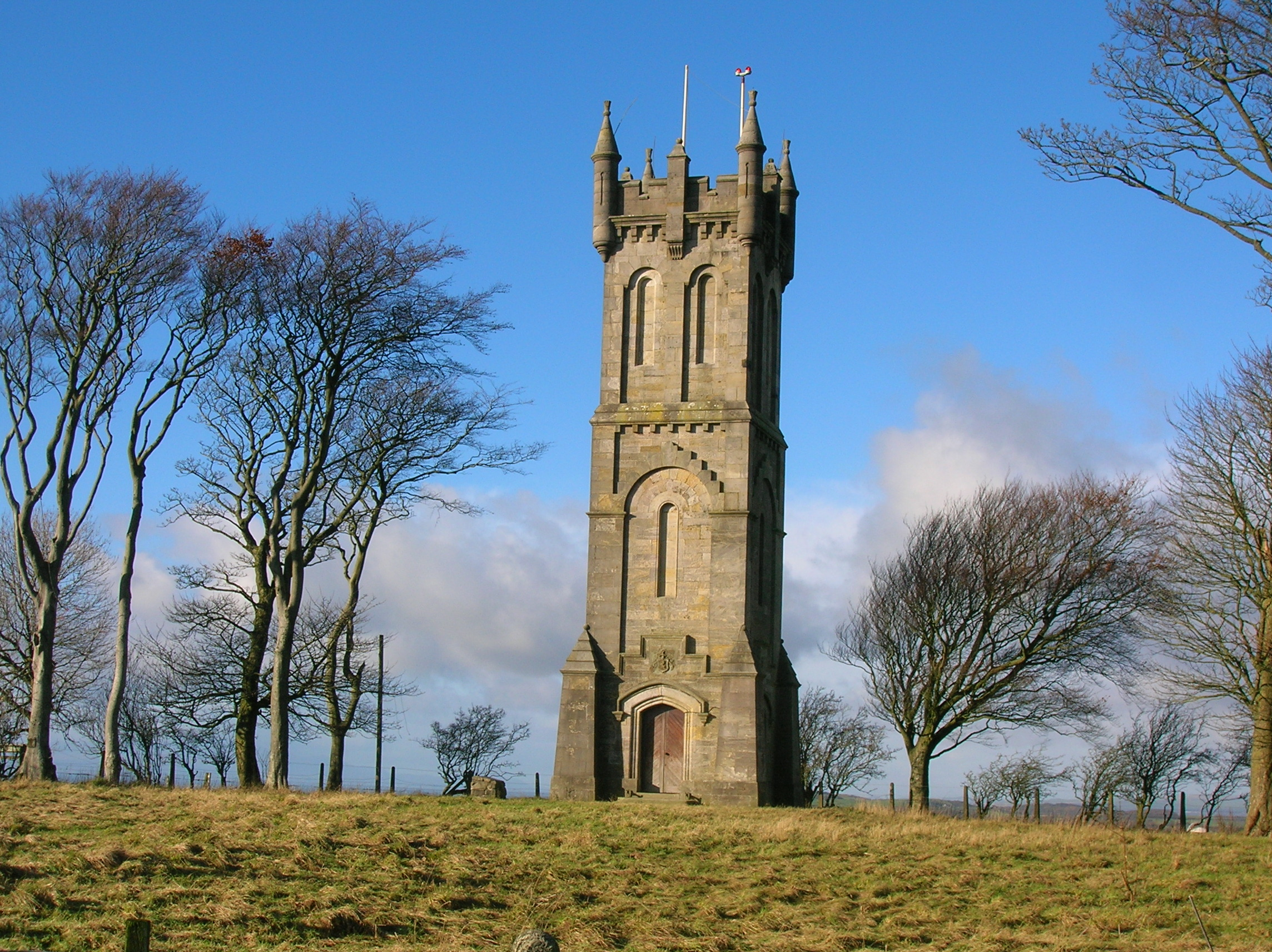
Wallace's Monument, Barnweil Hill

The picturesque Wallace's Monument is a Gothic structure in a prominent situation, built to commemorate William Wallace at the time of an upsurge in the Scottish desire for self-determination, predating the 1869 Wallace Monument at Stirling.

The story that the name Barnweil derives from an occasion when Wallace, standing on this elevated site, remarked that the Barns of Ayr (containing English soldiers) `burn weil' is an invention, the reason for the name being that it is situated close to the remains of the medieval parish church of Barnweil, a parish that suppressed in the 17th century.

=== Barnweil Church & village ===
Barnweil Church or kirk (NGR NS 40506 29903) is a ruined pre-reformation kirk situated on the slopes of Barnweil Hill about 3 km from Tarbolton. The church was known locally as the "Kirk in the Wood". It lies about 170m North North-East of Kirkhill Farm and was central to the Protestant Reformation in Ayrshire through its association with John Knox.

The village of Barnweil no longer exists, however old maps record the Townhead, Midtown and Townend of Barnweill dwellings in the vicinity along the length of the 'loaning' or roading. A manse for the church would have been located near by but the location has been lost.

=== Mansion houses ===
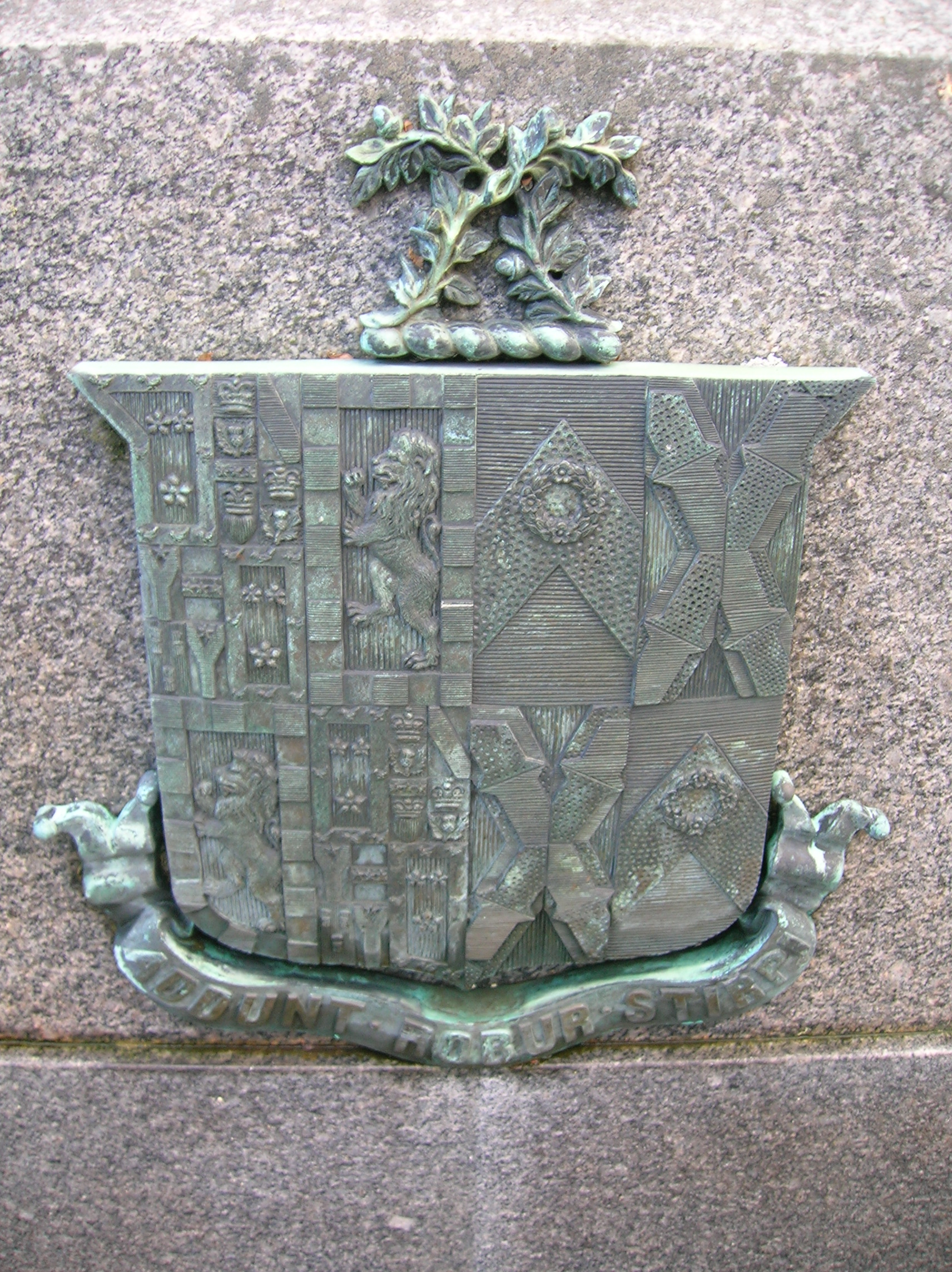
Findlay of Carnell coat of arms.

The estates in the parish were Carnell (Cairnhill), Barnweil, and Underwood. Underwood was held by the Kennedy family from 1785 and the mansion house dates from 1790. William Roxburgh, the botanist and surgeon, who was born here in 1759, his father probably working on the estate. The eighteenth century Barnweil House stands on the north-east slope of the hill.

Captain William Neill of Barnweil inherited Swindridgemuir House and estate near Dalry on the condition that he assumed the name 'Smith', thus becoming 'Smith-Neill' of Barnweil and Swinridgemuir. In 1850 Major James George Smith-Neill inherited the estates from his father, Colonel William Smith-Neill. In 1857, after the death of his father at Lucknow, Captain William James Smith-Neill of Barnweil, Swinridgemuir, and Kersland R.A. inherited the estates amounting to around 1,275 acres (516 hectares). J. W. Smith Neill CBE born in 1855, died in 1935 and his wife Evelyn died in 1947, both are buried in the Barnweil churchyard.

Carnell was once known as Cairnhill. Fiveways is a row of workers cottages that stands opposite to the main entrance to the mansion house; it once had a smithy. Carnell was held by the Wallaces, followed by the Cathcarts, then by the Hamiltons who built the present day Jacobean house and today (2018) by the Findlay family. A walled garden is present with a modern dower house. The Findlays and Hamiltons are buried at Craigie Church.

== Modern Craigie ==
As of today the only active remaining building is Craigie Village Hall. The village hall is the thriving hub of the village, hosting notably the Crossroads Young Farmers events, local art lessons and the community council meetings/events.

== Archaeology ==
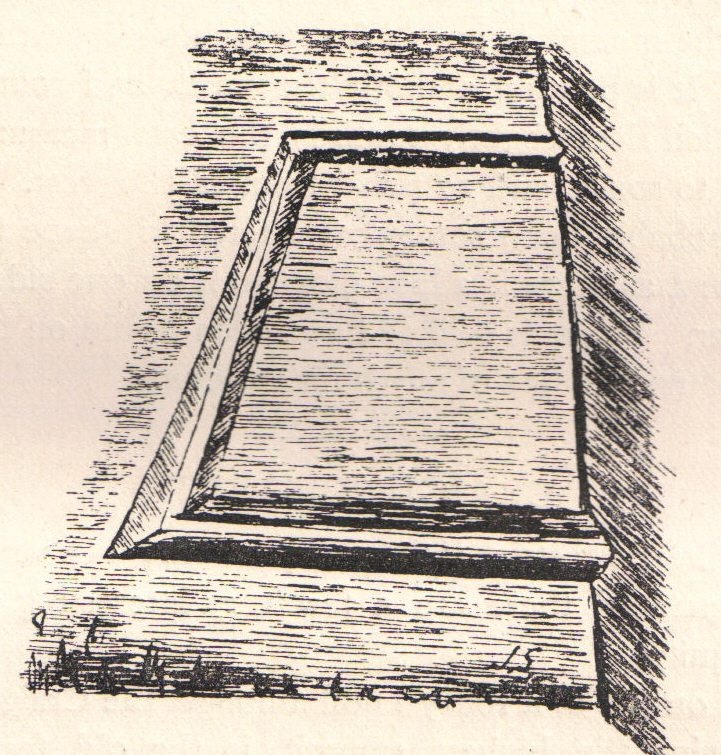
The moat of Barnweill Motte.

Near Meadowhead Farm is the location of Camp Castle, a probable Iron Age broch, roughly circular, sitting on a rocky knoll with a nearly five-metre (16 ft) thickness excavated in the early 1960s. The small Campcastle Farm once stood just to the west of the knoll.

Craigie Fort (NS428325) or oppidium had an entrance to the south and formed a large enclosure around the summit of the hill to the north of the village.

A fort once stood on the summit of Craigie Hill however it has been completely destroyed by the whinstone quarry workings.

A crannog was discovered, mostly formed from stones, in a boggy depression, once a lochan, to the south-west' of Craigie Castle in the 19th century together with a wooden oar.

A Roman fort stood in a prominent location on the slopes of Barnweil Hill and near by a Norman motte has left a rectangular ditch with an earth mound facing to the west.

In the Carnell woods stands a mound known as the Judgement Seat which may have been the moot hill where the barony court of Carnell once met. On Dollar Hill are the remains of an earth mound that may have been the gallows hill linked to the barony court where men were executed.

=== The White or Witch's Stone ===
This large stone lay in a field close to the church until the local farmer decided to exploit it and after blowing it up with gunpowder he was able to cart away 25 loads of stones, some of which were used to build the inn. The Witch's Stone is said to have appeared in the field following an incident where the church authorities had called a local witch to appear before them and in her anger she had lifted the stone and placed it on her apron, however as she flew towards the church with the intention of dropping it on the roof one of the apron strings broke and it landed instead in the field.

== Covenanters and Peden's Cave ==
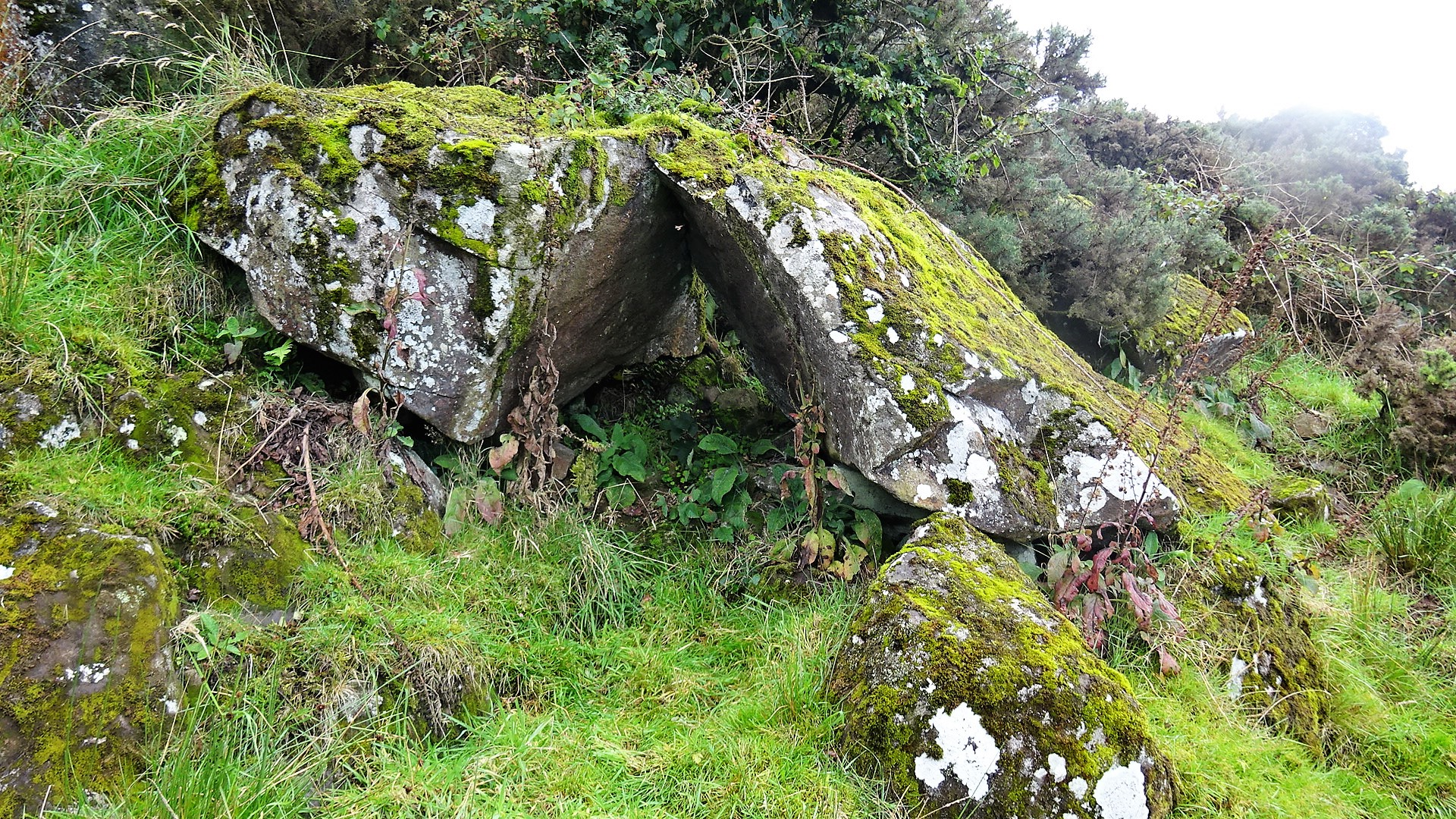
Peden's Cave near Craigie Hill

In October 1665 the Covenanter minister Alexander Peden is recorded as having preached at Craigie and a Peden's Cave has been recorded since the 19th century. The cave is formed from two large rocks leaning at an angle and shape reminiscent of a Gothic arch and leaving a cavity large enough for a person to shelter. The cave is located opposite the entrance lane to High and Low Langcraig Farms on a low knoll.

Peden preached at many outdoor conventicles and is said to have used a number of other caves as places of concealment during his years on the run from the King's troops, including Barskimming, one at Auchenbay near Ochiltree, another at the Nick of the Balloch, a further example near the Water of Girvan and his final cave hiding place may have been the Cleuch Glen in Sorn Parish which he reportedly asked to be made when he sensed that his illness was terminal, supposedly hiding beneath some straw when it was searched by soldiers. Peden was first buried at Auchinleck however his final resting place is at Cumnock.

== Notable people ==
- William Roxburgh (1751–1815), surgeon and botanist, born in Craigie
- Neil Snodgrass (1749-1849) civil engineer
- Rev Dr John Stirling (1776–1846), minister of the parish from 1806 to 1845 served as Moderator of the General Assembly in 1833.

== Curling & hunting ==
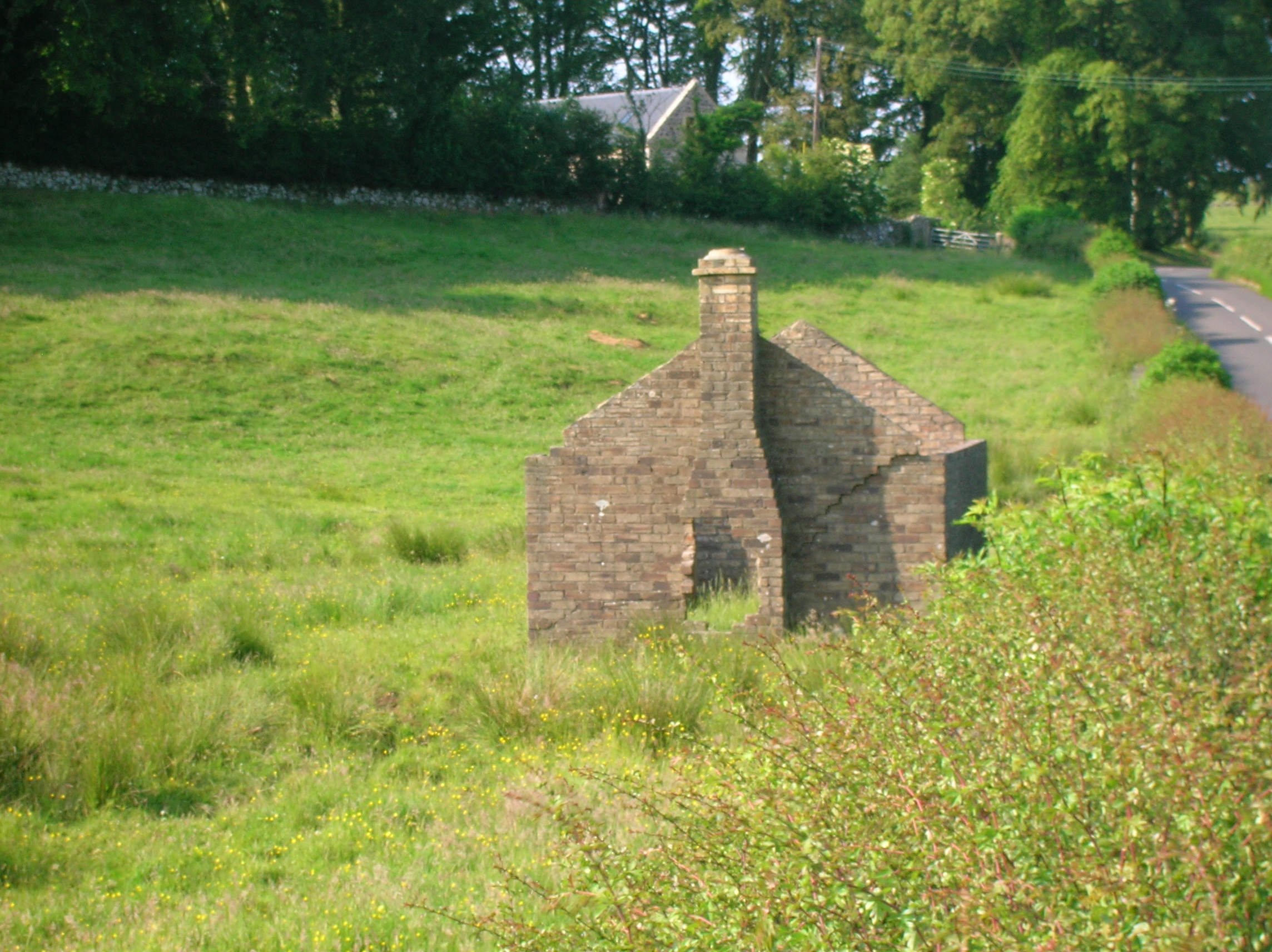
The Craigie Curling House in 2009 before it collapsed.

A ruined Curling house still stands below the old manse at the site of an old lochan in 1832 that was used as a curling pond with a brick dam added. It was a brick built rectangular building with a single fireplace and a corrugated iron roof. The dam and building were created in 1853. In 1902 the Tarbolton Curling Club played the Craigie Curling Club at Craigie and won by 74 to 64. Writing in 1926 a local recalled that when ice formed on the lochan the farmers, minister, teacher and neighbours all came to curl and the day's labour was forgotten.

The Eglinton Hunt came to Craigie Hill, Cover, Knowes and Glens with all the hunters dressed in red and the brush of the fox if caught was given to the first lady whilst the hounds devoured the corpse.

== Placenames ==
The settlement name means Rocky, an apt description of the village environs and the parish lands. The names Laigh, West and High Borland on old maps could refer to the presence of wild boar, however a 'Boor' also meant a serf and Norman lords often apportioned lands near their castles for their servants. The Borland or Bordland also meant the land that was granted to the feudal superior specifically to be used to furnish food for his castle or dwelling. A knoll on Craigie Hill is recorded as the Witch Knowe, a name that occurs throughout Ayrshire, without any local legend attached to it. Fiveways is a settlement for agricultural workers near the main entrance to Carnell House, clearly named after the lanes that meet here. Catcraig and Old Catcraig are common names however the element Cat has a wide and complex use. In this context it may derive from the Gaelic for summit Caid or refer to a cairn as in the Scots term Cat-heap.
