= Wallace's Monument, Ayrshire =

Wallace's Monument
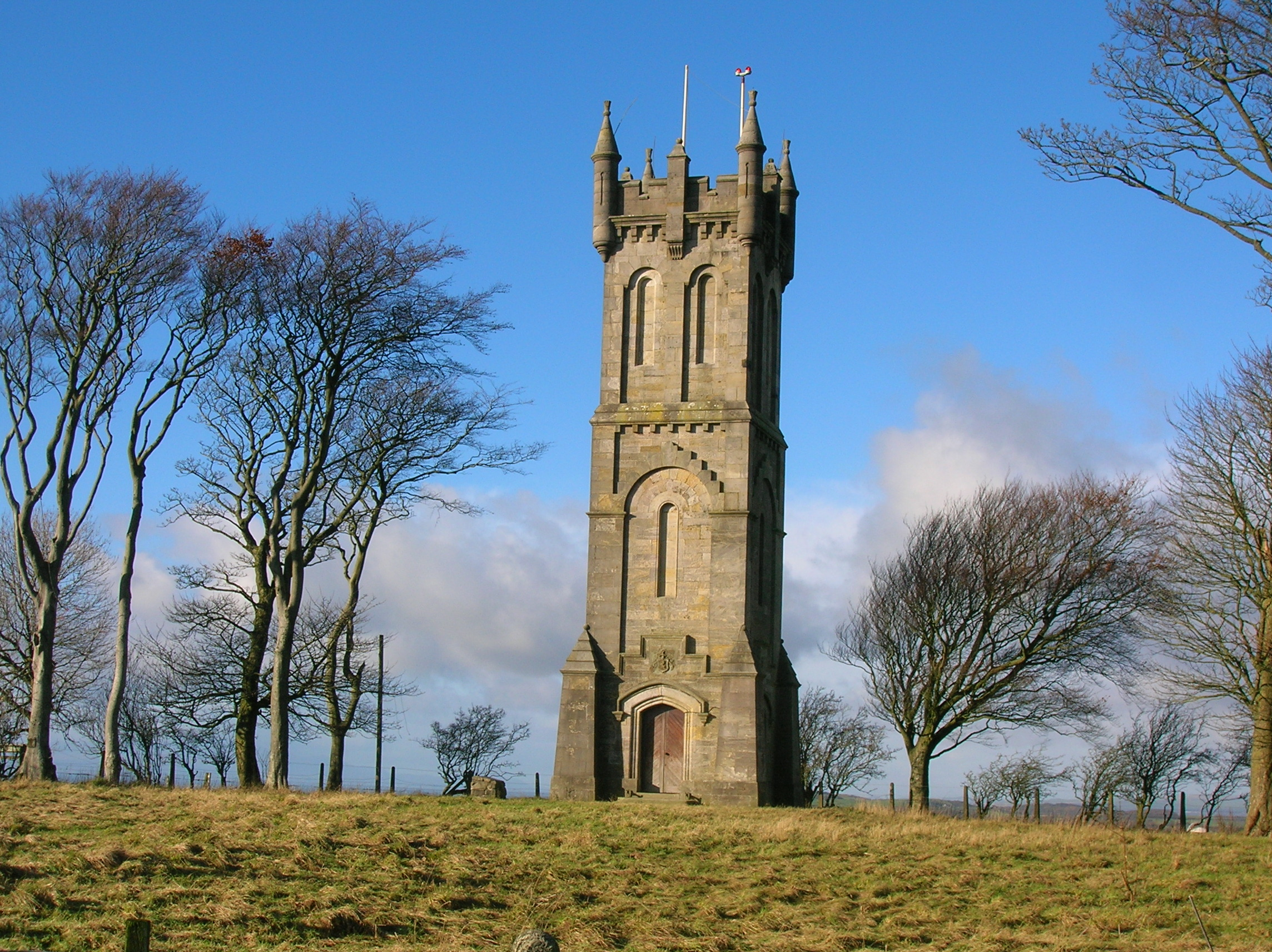
- Wallace's Monument from the entrance gate
- Wallace's Monument
- 55°31′58.9″N 4°31′34.9″W
- Location: Craigie, South Ayrshire
- Country: Scotland

History
- Former name: Barnweil Tower

Architecture
- Functional status: Closed to the public
- Heritage designation: Category A listed
- Architect: Robert Snodgrass from William Dobie's design
- Architectural type: Tower
- Style: Gothic
- Completed: 1857

Specifications
- Width: 12 ft (3.7 m)
- Height: 60 ft (18 m)
- Materials: Polished sandstone ashlar

Administration
- Parish: Craigie

Wallace's Monument, the Wallace Tower, or the Barnweil Monument (NS 240655 629488) is a category-A-listed building dedicated to the memory of William Wallace located on Barnweil Hill (153 m or 503 ft), a prominent location in the parish of Craigie, South Ayrshire, Scotland.

== History ==
=== Purpose and origins ===
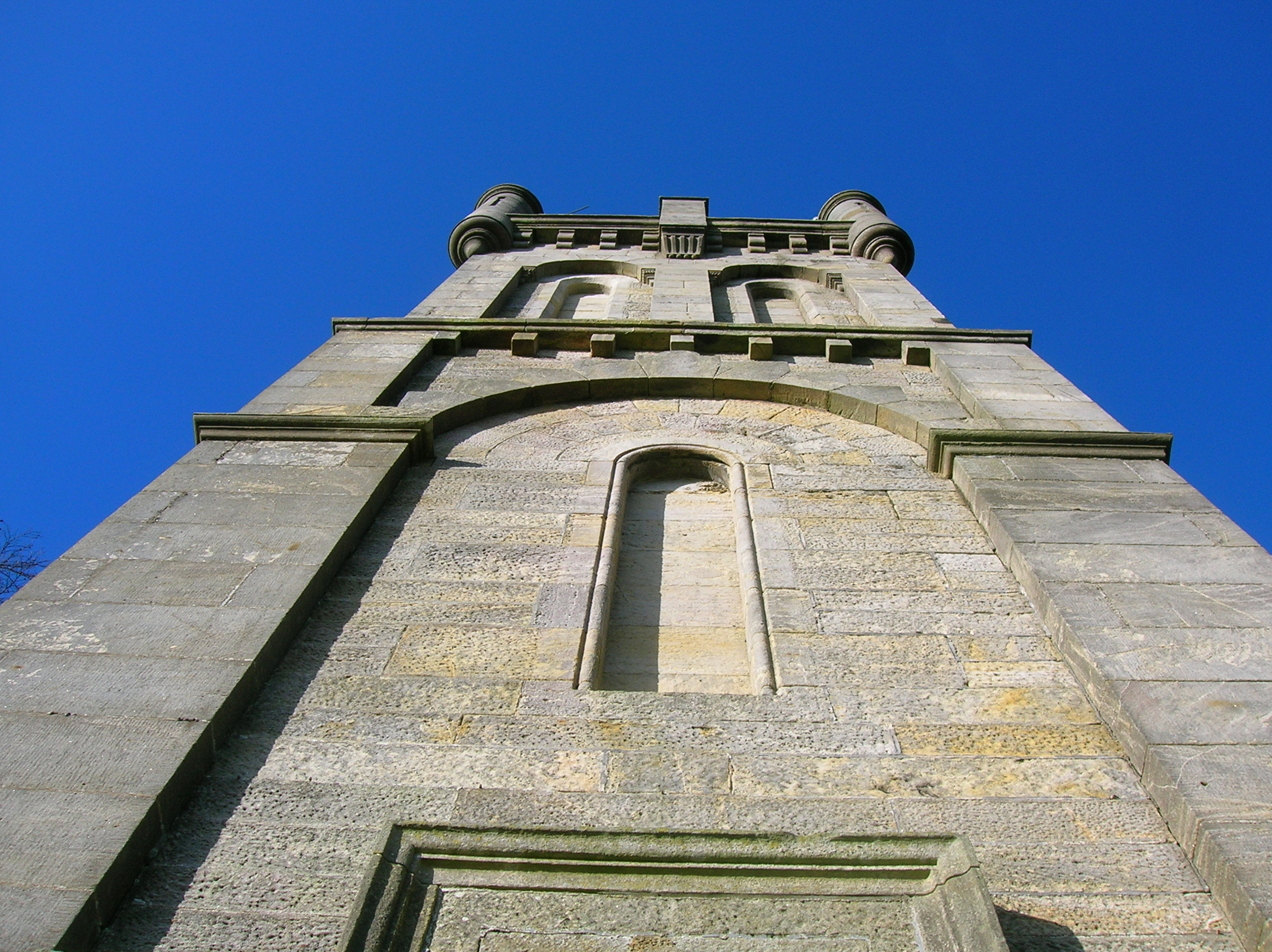
Detail of Wallace's Tower

The Wallace Monument is a picturesque Gothic structure and is in a prominent situation, built to commemorate William Wallace at the time of an upsurge in the Scottish desire for self-determination, predating the 1869 Wallace Monument at Stirling. The story is that the name derives from an occasion when Wallace, standing on this elevated site, remarked that the Barns of Ayr (containing English soldiers) `burn weil' is an invention, the reason for the name actually being that it is situated close to the remains of the medieval parish church of Barnweil, a parish that suppressed in the 17th century. In 1841 a stone was still pointed out upon which Wallace stood to view the conflagration.

The Ayr Advertiser of 12 October 1854 carried an advertisement calling for designs for the monument to be submitted to W F Love of Beith by 1 January 1855. The Ayr Advertiser of 30 October 1856 stated that the monument was designed by William Dobie of Beith, and was built by Mr Snodgrass. The Dobies were a well-to-do professional family with antiquarian interests. No evidence has been found of any call for public subscription. Robert Snodgrass senior, son of William Snodgrass, mason of Beith, practised as an architect-builder in Beith. The land was donated by Brigadier-General James George Smith-Neil of Barnweil House in 1855.

William Patrick of Roughwood and Woodside near Beith is also said to have erected the monument. Dobie states that after repeated attempts to arouse public sympathy in its favour he built the tower at his own expense.

==== Etymology ====
The name, also used as Barnwell, Barnweill and Burnweill, first recorded as Berenbouell circa 1177-1204 and Brenwyfle in 1306, is one of a cluster of names in this area that contains the Cymric place-name element pren-, meaning 'tree'.

=== Architecture ===
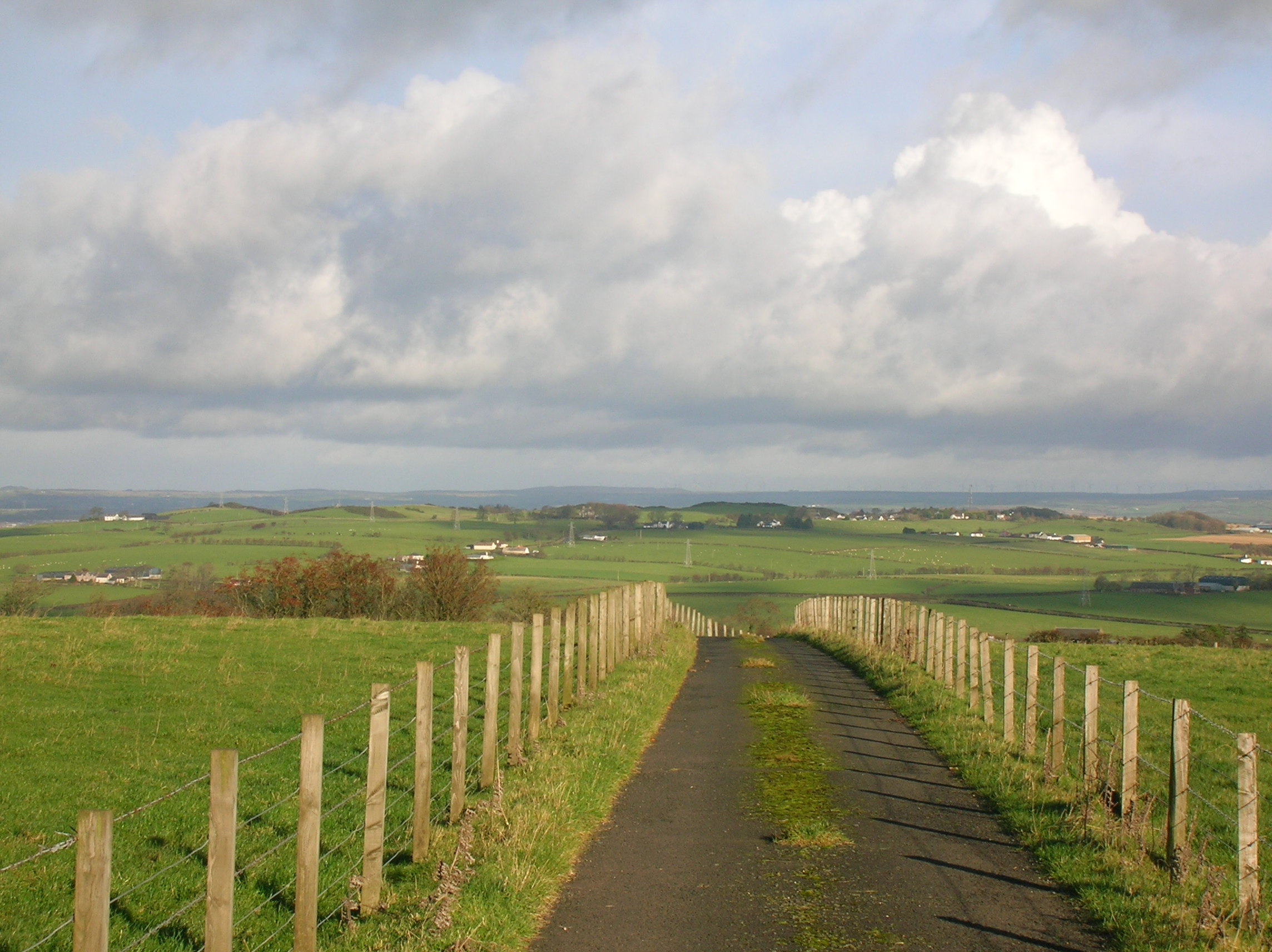
The view from Barnweil Hill looking south

Robert Snodgrass senior in 1855–7, built a square plan Gothic tower from polished sandstone ashlar blocks, 3-stage, 12 ft (3.7 m) wide at the base, 60 ft (18 m) high, with a pinnacled parapet. Base course; string courses; corbelled, shouldered band course between 2nd and 3rd stages; machicolated, crenellated parapet with thistle-finialled, conical-capped circular angle pinnacles and ball-finialled, ogee-capped square-plan wallhead pinnacles. Diagonally-boarded timber door in Tudor-arched, roll-moulded doorway with hoodmould to the south-east elevation; similar inscription recesses at other elevations. Round-arched recesses at 2nd stage; paired round-arched recesses at 3rd stage.

The Wallace family coat of arms and their motto 'Pro Libertate Patriae' are located above the entrance, carved by John Logan, a local sculptor.

A spiral staircase leads up to the viewing platform and the arms of the Wallace family are blazoned in bas-relief above the entrance door.

== Inscriptions ==
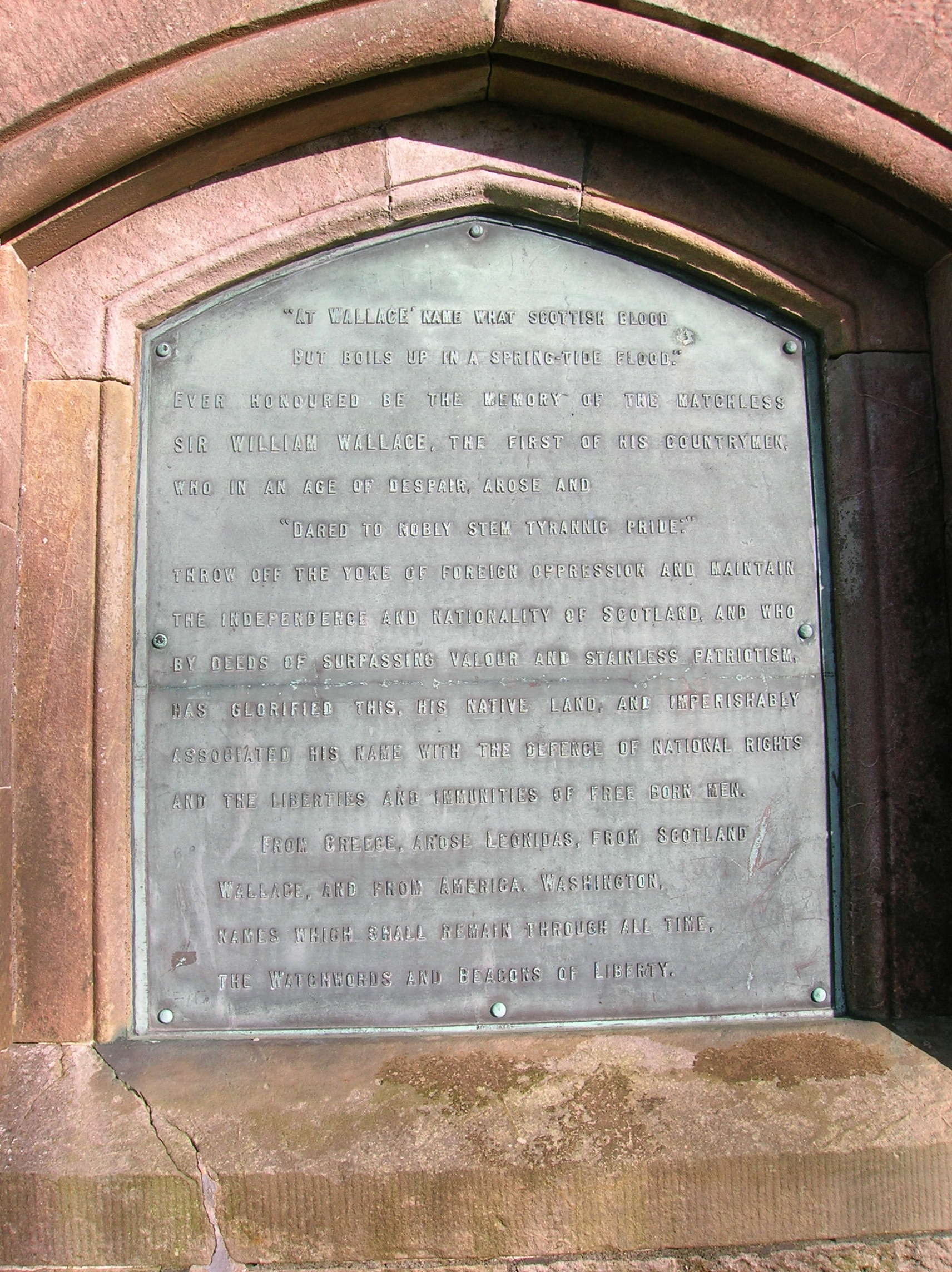
Plaque with heroic inscription

=== Tower base ===
On three sides are single bronze panels bearing rousing proclamations of Wallace's virtues and misfortunes :

Side 1 - "Erected MCCCCLV., in honour of Scotland's greatest national hero, the renowned Sir William Wallace, born MCCLXX., who after performing numerous exploits of the most consummate bravery in defence of the independence of his country was basely betrayed into the hands of his enemies by whom, to their everlasting disgrace, he was unjustifiably put to death on the XXII. of August, MCCC. Centuries have not dimmed the lustre of his heroic achievements; and the memory of this most disinterested of patriots shall through all ages be honoured and revered by his countrymen."

"A soul supreme, in each hard conflict tried,
Above all pain, all passion, and all pride,
The frowns of power, the blast of public breath,
The love of lucre, and the dread of death."

Side 2 - "Sir William Wallace, Regent of Scotland, MCCXCVII. In resistance to treacherous invasion, and in defence of the laws and liberties of his country, he fought against fearful odds the desperate battles of Biggar, Stirling, Blackearnside, and Falkirk, and between these actions, in little more than a year, he stormed and took from the invaders very fortress, castle, and town which they had seized in the Kingdom. Though worsted at Falkirk by overwhelming numbers, aided by fatal dissensions in his own army, he continued warring with the oppressors of his native land until his foul betrayal, seven years after that disastrous battle, by the execrable Monteith."

Side 3 -

"At Wallace name, what Scottish blood
But boils up in a spring-tide flood!

"Ever honoured be the memory of the matchless Sir William wallace, the first of his countrymen who in an age of despair arose and

"Dared to nobly stem tyrannic pride,

throw off the yoke of foreign oppression, and maintain the independence and nationality of Scotland; and who, by deeds of surpassing valour and stainless patriotism, has glorified this his native land, and imperishably associated his name with the defence of national rights and the liberties and immunities of freeborn men. From Greece arose Leonidas, from Scotland Wallace, and from America Washington - names which shall remain through all time the watchwords and beacons of liberty."

=== Tower summit ===
Cut into the stonework at the top of the tower are the words "The Barns o' Ayr burn weel"

== Environs and Warden's Lodge ==
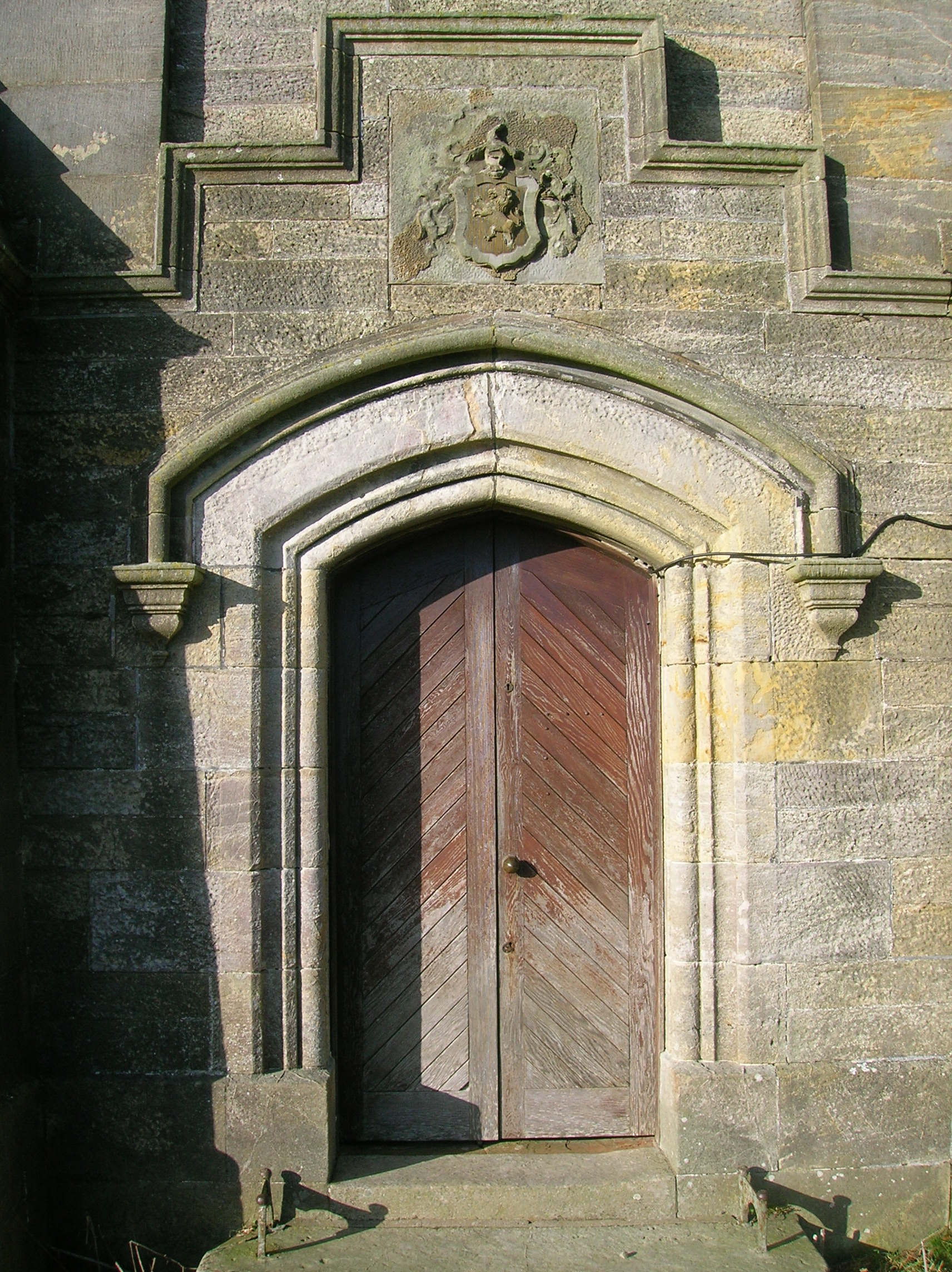
The entrance to the monument

Site of Wallace's Monument on Barnweil Hill

The tower stands in a circular enclosed area of ground with a group of trees surviving from the original extensive plantings.

To the left of the gate as you enter the plot once stood a neat lodge where the tower's warden or guide lived. In Archibald Adamson's time (1875) a Visitors' book existed that shows over 2000 visitors between 1857 and 1858. A number of interesting portraits were displayed, including a fine lithograph of Wallace was amongst and amongst the others were portraits of Robert Burns, King Robert the Bruce, General Neill and a full-length portrait of the Earl of Eglinton.

The OS Maps indicate that the lodge stood until the 1970s, however no remains are now extant. It has also been suggested that it was demolished between 1945 and 1947, the contents being taken to Ayr Town Hall.

The view from the tower battlements is of the town of Ayr, the site of Coilsfield House, Rosemount, Tarbolton, Arran, Kilmarnock, and the Carrick Hills.

== Ownership and access ==
The tower was not provided with an endowment by its builders and became the responsibility of the Ayr Town Council and its successor, South Ayrshire Council. At first, as stated, a guide was employed to show visitors around, later the key was available from nearby Barnweil Hill Farm, then the monument could be accessed by arrangement with South Ayrshire Council. At present the tower is closed, although a 'Tourist' road sign exists to direct visitors to view the site. No car park exists.

== Flying the Saltire ==
For many years the flag on the tower was flown at half mast on 25 September, the day on which General Neil of Barnweil was killed. Bryden records that 'the flag' was displayed on 15 May, 12 June, 12 July and 11 September, as these were the dates of the burning of the Barns of Ayr, and the battles of Biggar, Black Earnside, and Stirling in the years 1297 and 1298. Additionally the flag was raised on 24 June to commemorate Bannockburn and on the birthday of Robert Burns, every 25 January. The flying of a flag was one of the conditions that the trustees made when they passed the ownership to Ayr in 1898.

== See also ==
- Barnweill Church
- Wallace Monument
