= Barnweill Church =

Ruined pre-reformation kirk in South Ayrshire, Scotland

Coordinates: 55.5367°N 4.5289°W

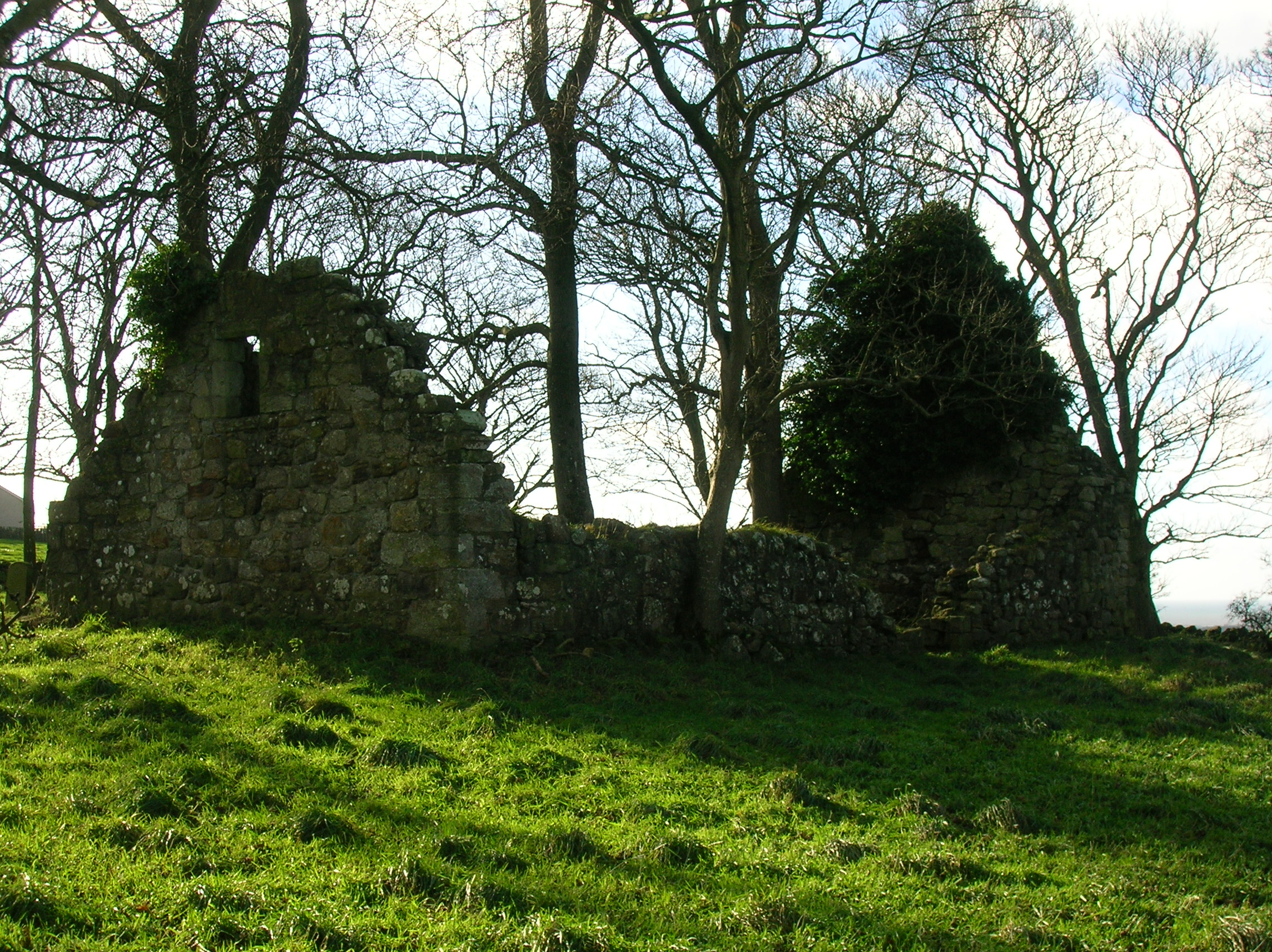
- Barnweill Parish Church (suppressed 1673)
- Barnweill Church
- Location: Craigie, South Ayrshire
- Country: Scotland
- Denomination: Protestant

History
- Former name: 'Kirk in the Wood'
- Status: Incumbent driven out in 1689
- Dedication: Originally to the Holy Rood
- Events: Significant links with John Knox

Architecture
- Functional status: Cemetery in use until 1963
- Heritage designation: Category B listed
- Closed: 1689

Specifications
- Materials: Dressed stone and rubble

Administration
- Parish: Barnweil until 1673, then Craigie

Barnweill Church or Barnweil Church (NGR NS 40506 29903) is a ruined pre-reformation kirk situated on rising ground on the slopes of Barnweill Hill, Parish of Craigie, South Ayrshire, Scotland; about 3 km from Tarbolton. The church was known locally as the "Kirk in the Wood". It lies about 170m North North-East of Kirkhill Farm. Barnweill was central to the Protestant Reformation in Ayrshire through its association with John Knox. The spelling 'Barnweill' is used throughout for consistency.

== History ==
=== Etymology ===
The name, also used as Barnwell, Barnweil and Burnweill, first recorded as Berenbouell circa 1177-1204 and Brenwyfle in 1306, is one of a cluster of names in this area that contains the Cymric place-name element pren-, meaning 'tree'. Robert Gordon's map of circa 1636-5 marks a Barnwyl Kirk and Blaeu's Atlas, from Timothy Pont's survey of about 1600, as the old Castle of Barnwyiel.

Tradition records that the name "Barnweill" derives from an incident following on from the burning of the English in the Barns of Ayr by William Wallace and references in Scots to the fact that The barns burn weil. One author suggests a derivation from Bar-n-weild meaning The Hill of Streams.

=== Links with Fail Monastery ===
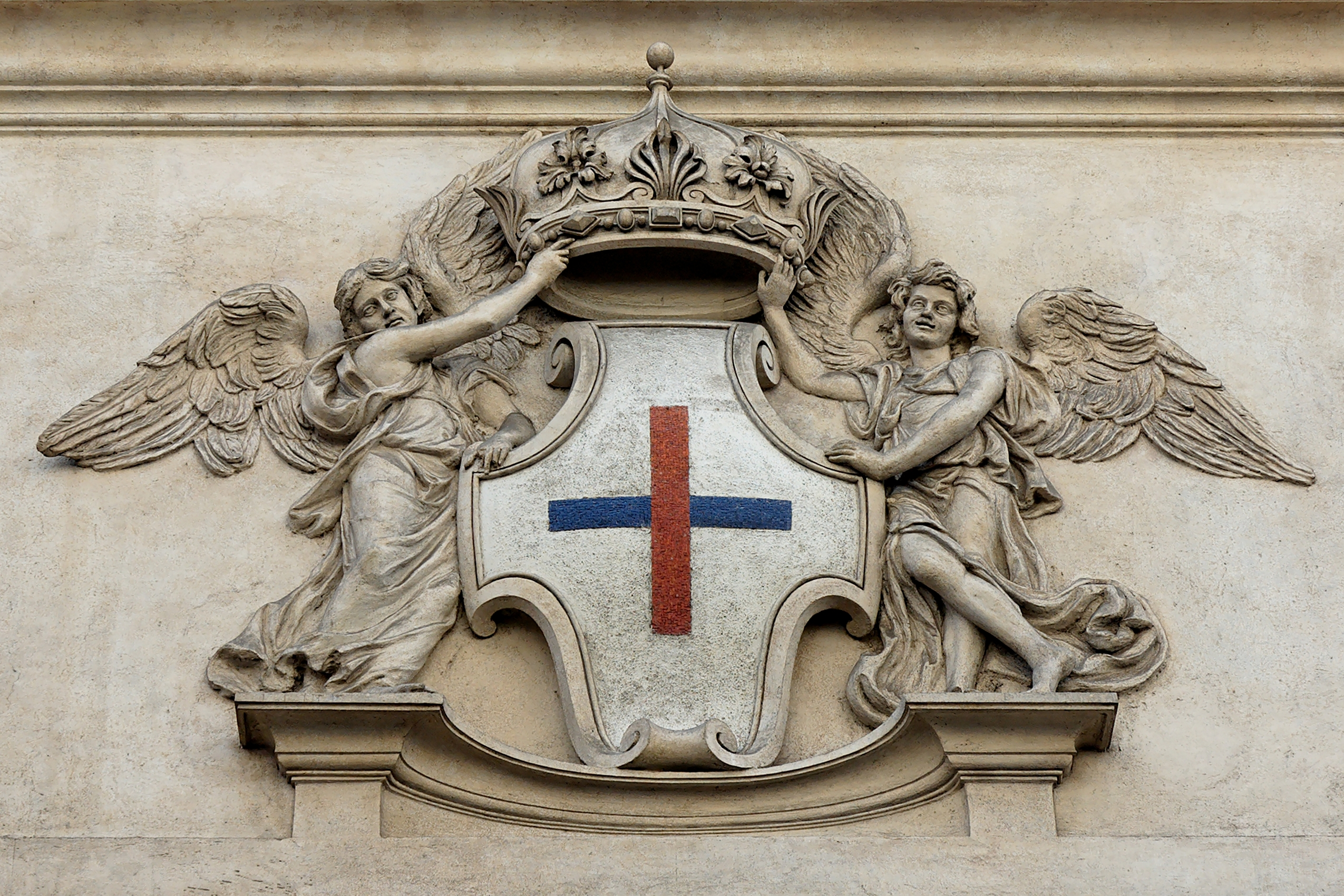
Stone emblem of the Trinitarian Order on the façade of San Carlo alle Quattro Fontane (1638-1641) in Rome.

The Parish of Barnweill, its church and incomes belonged to Fail Monastery up until the reformation in 1563. Fail Monastery was held by the Trintarians, also known as the 'Red Friars', or 'Mathurines' from the monastery of Saint Mathurin in Paris. The monks were charged with the duty of saving captives from slavery and were called 'The Father's of Redemption'.

=== Parish history ===
A few scant records exist of a parish called "Balinclog" and it has been suggested that the foundation of Fail Monastery led to the lands of Barnweil being granted to the new foundation and the remainder of the old parish lands, "Barmuir", being incorporated into those of Tarbolton.

Suppression

The Parish of Barnweill, in the old District of Kyle, was suppressed in 1673 and the larger part of the stipend was transferred to the minister of the newly erected Parish of Stair. Nearby Craigie had been disjoined from the Parish of Riccarton in 1647, and in 1673, it received an augmentation by the annexation of the newly suppressed Parish of Barnweill. It is said that the Earl of Stair was the prime mover in suppressing the parish because of the inconvenient horse ride he had to undertake to get to Barnweill Church from his home at Stair.

The suppression met with considerable opposition from the parishioners and the heritors and it was not until 1707 that the Presbytery annexed the old parish to that of Craigie and Tarbolton. Until 1707 the Minister of Stair had to preach under an oak tree on the Fulton Estate to lawfully qualify for the stipends of Barnweil. A number of the old Barnweill parishioners joined the Symington Church.

Through the connection with Fail Monastery, the churches of Barnweil and Symington were linked since the 13th century. The linked congregations of Symington and Craigie still gather at Barnweil Church each Easter at sunrise to celebrate the Resurrection.

=== Ministers, Readers, Clerks and Exhorters ===
In the early 1600s Robert Cunningham was the minister of Barnweill. His wife was Jean, daughter of Robert Hunter of Hunterston.

In "An 'Advertistment' about the Service Book, 1637" an Alexander Henderson, is recorded as Minister at Barnweill,

In 1662 Ayrshire had forty-seven parishes and during the 'Killing Times' of Charles II and James VII Barnwiell was the only one that conformed willingly to Episcopy. The minister at the time was 'Mr Robert Wallace' who was related to the then Chancellor, Lord Glencairn. He was "famous for his large stomach" and became Bishop of the Isles despite not speaking any Scots Gaelic.

The Rev Robert Kincaid was the last incumbent of Barnweill and he was driven from the church in 1689, retiring to Glasgow where he died in 1691. His sister, Jean Kincaid, married the Rev John Bogle who was likewise driven from Dundonald, also in 1689.

Robert Gaw from Fail Monastery was a reader at Barnweil in 1574. David Allanson was a reader at Barnweill from 1576 and 1580. He may have been a friar from one of the pre-Reformation establishments in Ayrshire.

Sir John Miller, former chaplain and vicar of Symington, became exhorter (a specific church-related job) at Barnweill in 1561.

The Wallace's of Craigie held the parish clerkship of Barnweill. The clerk John Riddell resigned in 1508 and the position passed to the laird's natural son Paul Wallace who had to carry out basic duties such as keeping the church clean and tidy, making the responses art masses, distributing holy water to parishioners homes for certain ceremonies, etc.

=== The Church ===
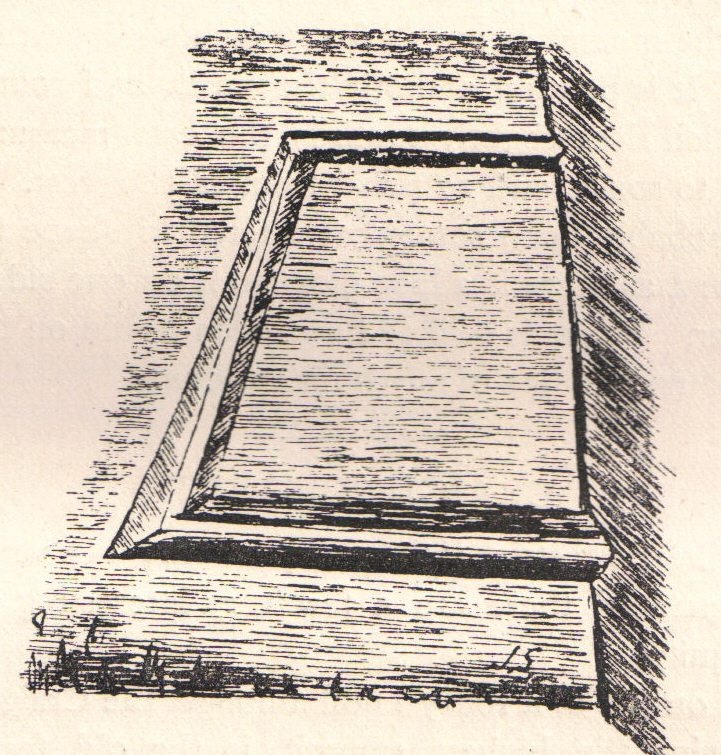
The moat of Barnweill Castle.

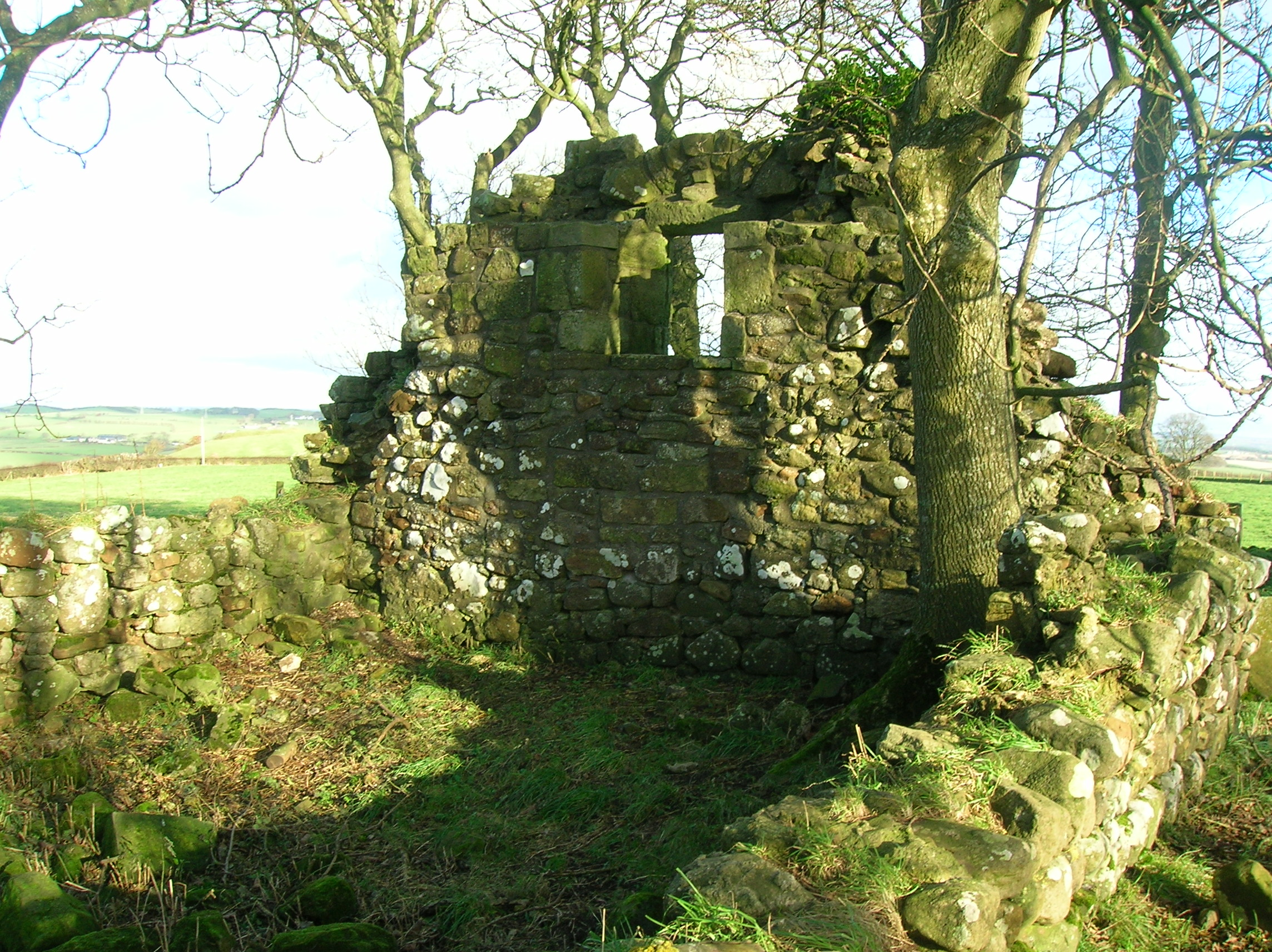
The East gable end of Barnweill church.

The small rectangular ruins (13.7m by 5.7m within walls 0.75m thick, reduced to about 1.5m in height) sit within a roughly square walled cemetery and are category B listed. This pre-Reformation kirk is said to have been built about the beginning of the 15th century, but when the Parish was suppressed in circa 1673 when the kirk was allowed to gradually fall into ruins. This single storey building had an entrance in both the north and south walls; in the east gable is a segmental arched window which may support a 15th-century. The existing building appears to be of 17th-century date, however, the more substantial west gable that rises from a chamfered base-plinth with an offset at the height of the main wall-head, may also be medieval.

Records show that in 1857 the ivy-covered gables stood to their original height, but the side walls were already almost level with the ground. Clear signs of 'recent' repairs and consolidation are apparent. The bell was still in place in the early 1800s and was taken away, eventually being given to the Scottish Episcopalian Chapel at Ayr in 1857. An upturned font was said to be in the west gable, although this may in fact be an aumbry or sacrament house.

==== The cemetery ====
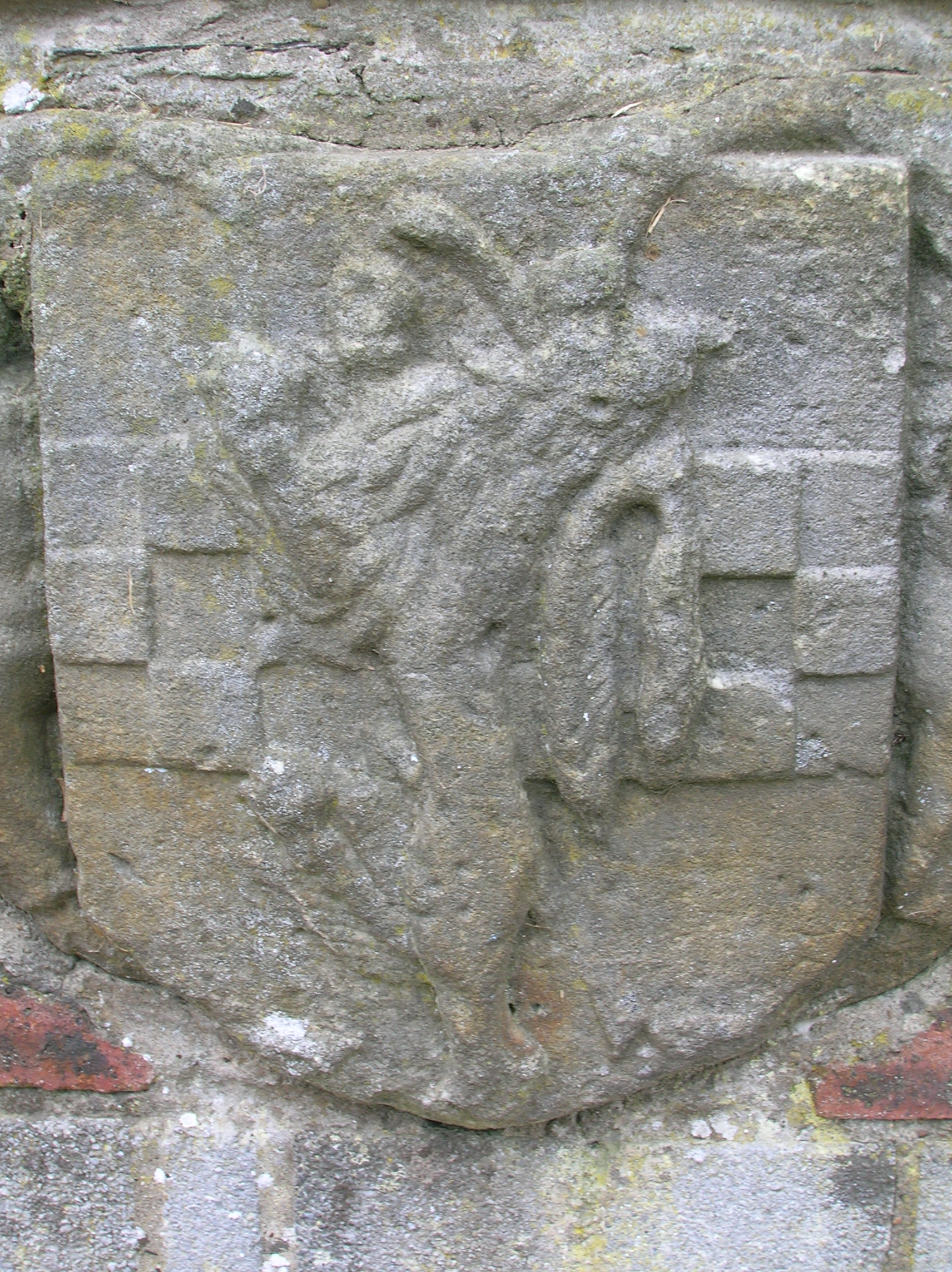
Coat of Arms of the Wallaces of Craigie Castle

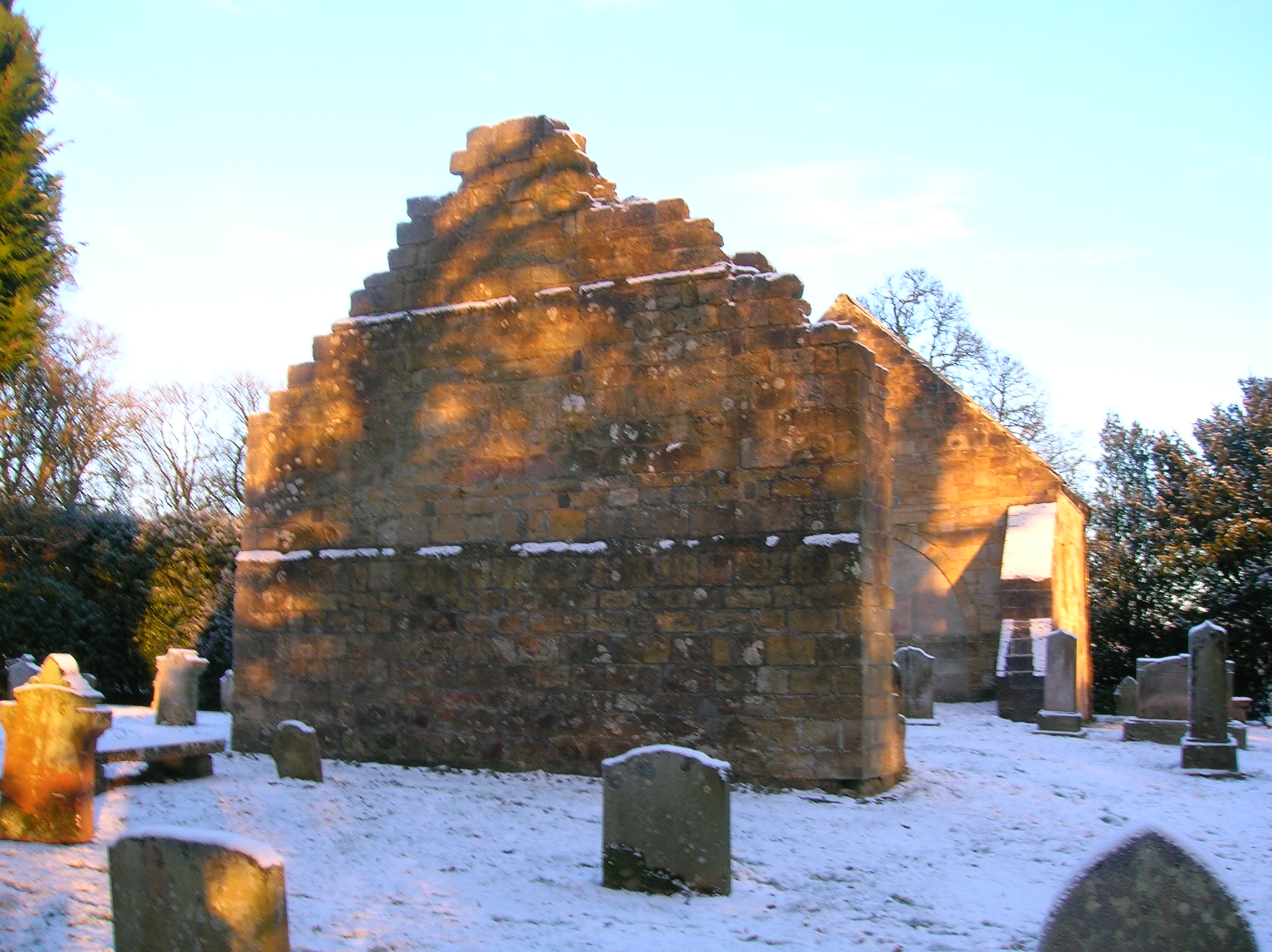
Loudoun Kirk ruins, a similar pre-reformation Ayrshire Kirk.

The oldest legible tombstone, in the roughly square walled and tree encircled churchyard of about half an acre, is dated 1661, although several others appear to be much older. An ancient trackway runs to the church from the nearby lane close to ditches and earthworks that may have been the site of Barnweill Castle. This would have been the access for funeral processions as well as the congregation. The last burial appears to have been in 1963. At least two stones carry a raised shield device for a coat of arms and one is that of a lion, the bearing of the Wallaces of Craigie Castle. Gravestones bear the names Neil of Barnweill House, Brown of Barnweill, Glover, Anderson, Fraser, Reid, Greig, Millar, McCallum, Carrie, Lamont, etc.

One curiosity is a memorial to Col J W Neil Smith of Barnweill and Swindridgemuir that also bears the details of his wife Evelyn Mary Mapis Duke who died on 21 June 1940. 'Tout comprendre c'est tout pardonner' is carved on this stone and on a smaller wooden cross that bears her details alone. Another curiosity is a small gravestone to 'Our Dear Frau' on a small fallen gravestone of 1911, isolated in a far corner and probably that of a family pet.

=== John Knox ===
John Knox is recorded as once having preached in Barnweill Church and it is said that this church is notable in the history of Scotland as being the place where he first set up the Standard of the Reformation in Ayrshire.

=== Micro-history ===
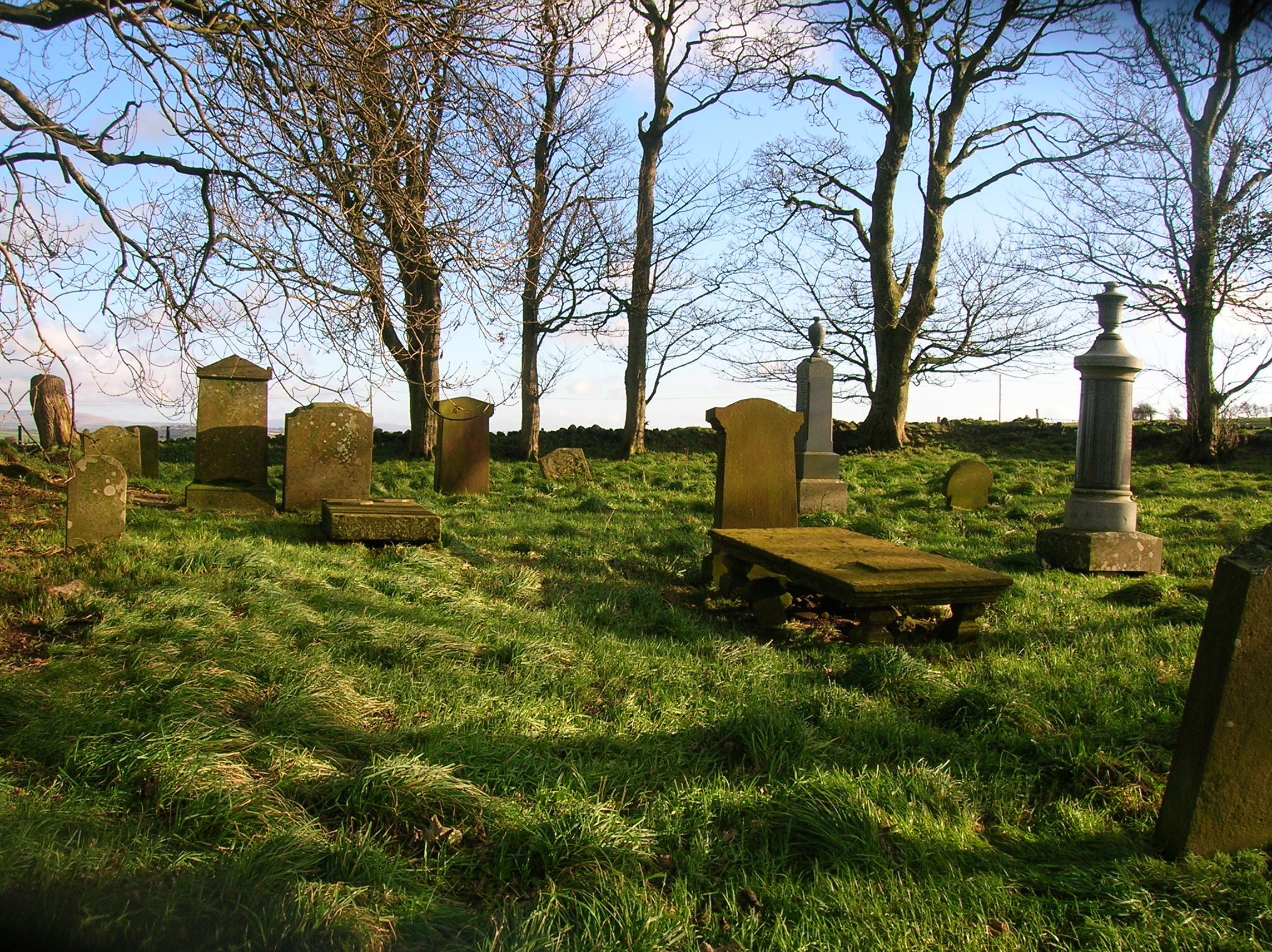
The old cemetery at Barnweill Church.

The arrangement of a church located nearby to a fortified house was a common one in Ayrshire.

The village of Barnweill no longer exists, however old maps record the Townhead, Midtown and Townend of Barnweill dwellings in the vicinity along the length of the 'loaning' or roading.

The 'Domestic Annals of Scotland' for Queen Anne (1702-1714) record that 'Some ill-disposed persons, said to be of the suppressed Parish of Barnweil, set fire to the new church of Stair in the night-time.

The Witch of Barnweill was a woman from the old Parish of Barnweill who was burned in Ayr in 1586/7. The gruesome expenses are recorded in the Ayr Burgh accounts as being £7 3s 8d for candles, drink, and meat as well as pitch, coals, heather, trees and other items.

The Barony of Barnweill was held by the Hamilton and Wallace families.

Underwood House was once known as Nether Barnweill.

== See also ==
- Wallace's Monument, Ayrshire
