= Neil Snodgrass =

Scottish inventor and engineer

Neil Snodgrass (1776–1849) was a 19th-century Scottish inventor and engineer. He created one of the world's first twin-hulled ships.

== Life ==
He was born in Craigie, South Ayrshire in 1776 and educated at Ayr Academy achieving high honours in mathematics.

In 1794 he went to work as an engineer for Messrs George Houston & Co on Johnstone. There, in 1798 he invented a system of heating premises by steam ( a precursor to central heating). Around 1799 he was appointed Manager of a mill belonging to Messrs Dale & Mackintosh at Dornoch and introduced the same steam-heating system. In 1806 he was awarded a gold medal by the London Society of the Arts for this invention.

In 1802 at Dornoch he invented a machine for cleaning cotton or flax waste known as the "Scutcher" (a type of blowing machine). In 1804 he returned to George Houston & Co In 1809 a new pulley system.

In 1818 he set up his own cotton mill at 23 Brunswick Place in Mile End in Glasgow. In 1822 he introduced a new device improving steam cylinders, a new air pump condensing engine, and a device for both preventing smoke and consuming smoke. In 1823 a tube-roving machine (involved with weaving). Despite these improvements he was hit hard by the weavers strike of 1824. He was not sympathetic and sacked strikers and reduced wages. resulting in the workers stoning the windows of the factory.

In 1825 he made his most important invention, the piston ring, improved by John Ramsbottom 25 years later.

His work on smokeless chimneys attracted the attention of Glasgow council. The system introduced an Argand lamp at the base of the chimney and blowing very cold air over this greatly increased the efficiency of the chimney, reducing smoke considerably and reducing coal consumption by around 15%. The less satisfactory aspect was a greatly increased fire risk. The Mile End factory was burnt out and rebuilt three times. The cost of this followed by a law-suit regarding storage of cotton-bales brought about Snodgrass's bankruptcy in 1830. At this time he was living at William Street near the factory.

In 1835 he went to the United States as part of a project to introduce piston rings to the numerous steamships on the Hudson River. During this visit he encountered the American Steam Raft, a strange steam-powered vessel sitting on multiple pontoons. Inspired by this, on his return to Scotland in 1836, he created a twin-hulled design, surrounding a central paddle wheel, holding multiple upper decks which he called the "Cigar", patenting the idea on 15 March 1837. The vessel was constructed ready for launch on the River Clyde in May 1837. The design was not wholly successful due to the under-sizing of the floating cylinders in relation to the weight of the superstructure and she sat very low in the water.

As the "Cigar" also handled poorly she was taken out of use in 1840 and then moored at Glasgow Green for use as a floating cafe and platform for bathers near the Humane Society Building. It was mooted to take her to the quieter waters of Loch Lomond as a pleasure craft, but this met with strong opposition from David Napier who ran an existing paddle-steamer the Euphrosyne on the loch serving the same intended function.

The structure (now named the "Floating Baths" and in new ownership) did not go to Loch Lomond but was placed for sale in January 1844.

Snodgrass lived his final years at 105 South Portland Street in Glasgow.

He died of a stroke in his home on 31 January 1849.

== Family ==
In August 1807 at Paisley Abbey he married Agnes Hodgart. Their son Neil Snodgrass (1818–1873) was born in Barony, Lanarkshire. Their daughter Agnes Hodgart Snodgrass married Thomas Arrol, and were parents of William Arrol, founder of the shipbuilding company Sir William Arrol & Co.

== Artistic recognition ==
He was portrayed by G. A. Lutenor
