= James George Smith Neill =

British military officer (1810–1857)

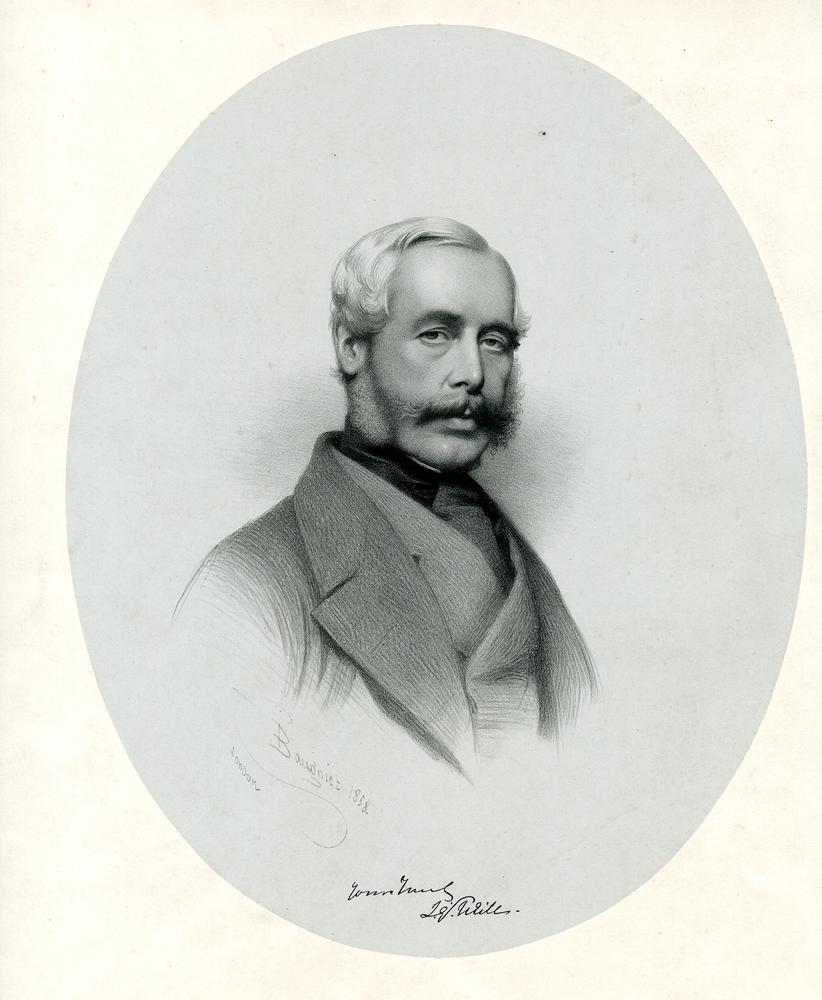
- Born: 27 May 1810; Swindridgemuir, Scotland, United Kingdom
- Died: 25 September 1857 (aged 47); Lucknow, British India
- Military career
- Allegiance: East India Company
- Branch: Madras Army
- Service years: 1827–1857
- Rank: Brigadier-General
- Conflicts: Second Burmese War; Crimean War; Indian Rebellion of 1857

James George Smith Neill (27 May 1810 – 25 September 1857) was a British military officer of the East India Company, who served during the Indian rebellion of 1857.

== Early career ==
James Neill was born on 26 May 1810 at Swindridgemuir, near Dalry, Scotland, the eldest son of Colonel Neill. He was educated at the University of Glasgow. Entering the service of the British East India Company in 1827, he received his lieutenant's commission a year later. From 1828 to 1852 he was mainly employed in duty with his regiment, the 1st Madras Europeans (of which he wrote a Historical Record), but gained some experience on the general and the personal staffs as D.A.A.G. and as aide-de-camp. In 1850 he received his majority, and two years later set out for the Second Burmese War with the regiment. He served throughout the war with distinction, became second-in-command to Cheape, and took part in the minor operations which followed, receiving the brevet of lieutenant-colonel. In June 1854 he was appointed second-in-command to Sir Robert Vivian to organize the Turkish contingent for the Crimean War.

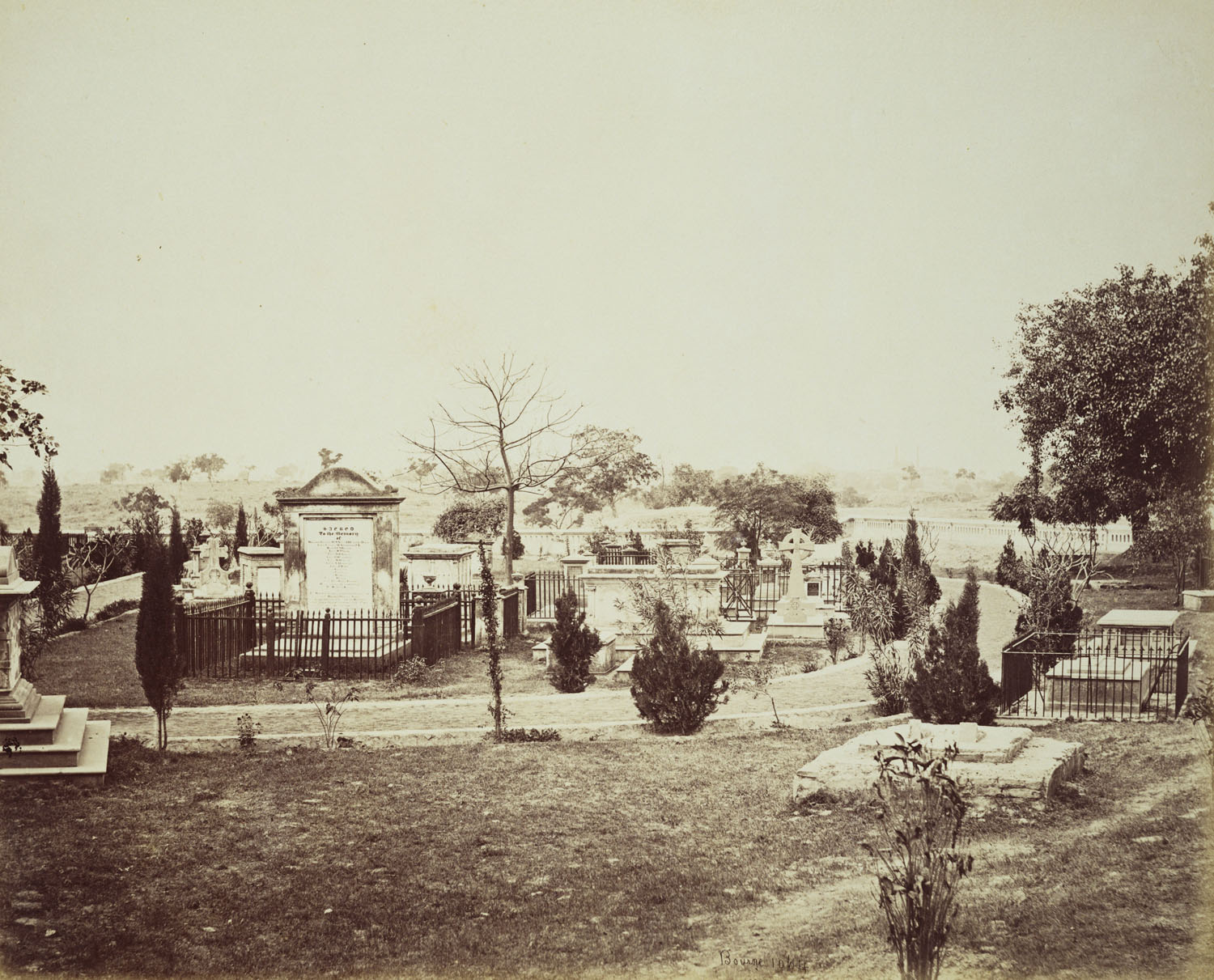
Lucknow Residency. Original graves of General Neill and others seen at the left, Sir Henry Lawrence's tomb is at the right.

== Indian Rebellion of 1857 ==
Early in 1857, Neill returned to the Indian subcontinent. Six weeks after his arrival came the news that all northern India was aflame with revolt (see the Indian rebellion of 1857). Neill acted promptly; he left Madras with his regiment at a moment's notice, and proceeded to Benares. As soon as he arrived on 3 June, he preemptively disbanded the local sepoy regiment. A regiment of Sikhs stationed at Varanasi, normally considered 'loyal', revolted. They fled after Neill's commanders shot at them, but returned to duty later.

On 9 June, Neill set out for Allahabad, where a handful of Europeans still held out in the fort against the rebels. Neill ordered hanging of those suspected of being the mutineers. According to one of his officers, he also allowed troops under his command to summarily execute non-combatants without due process and burn their houses. His Sikh forces stationed at Jaunpur revolted upon seeing these atrocities. From 6 to 15 June his men forced their way under conditions of heat and of opposition.

Allahabad was soon made the concentration of Henry Havelock's column. Neill then turned to the besieged city of Cawnpore. In retaliation for the Bibighar massacre of European civilians at Cawnpore, Neill and his troops indulged in indiscriminate atrocities. He personally executed many prisoners of war. In one episode, he compelled randomly rounded up Brahmins from Cawnpore, who had nothing to do with the massacre, to wash up the blood of the Bibighar victims from the floor, an act that presumably degraded them with loss of caste, while they were whipped until they collapsed with cat-o-nine-tails by young ensigns. They were then summarily executed by hanging.

Meanwhile, Havelock, in spite of a succession of victories, had been compelled to fall back for lack of men; Neill criticized his superior's action. A second expedition had the same fate, and Neill himself was now attacked, though by his own exertions and Havelock's victory at Bithor (16 August) the tension on the communications was ended. Havelock's men returned to Cawnpore, and cholera broke out there, whereupon Neill again committed himself to criticisms, this time addressed to the commander-in-chief and to Outram, who was on the way with reinforcements.

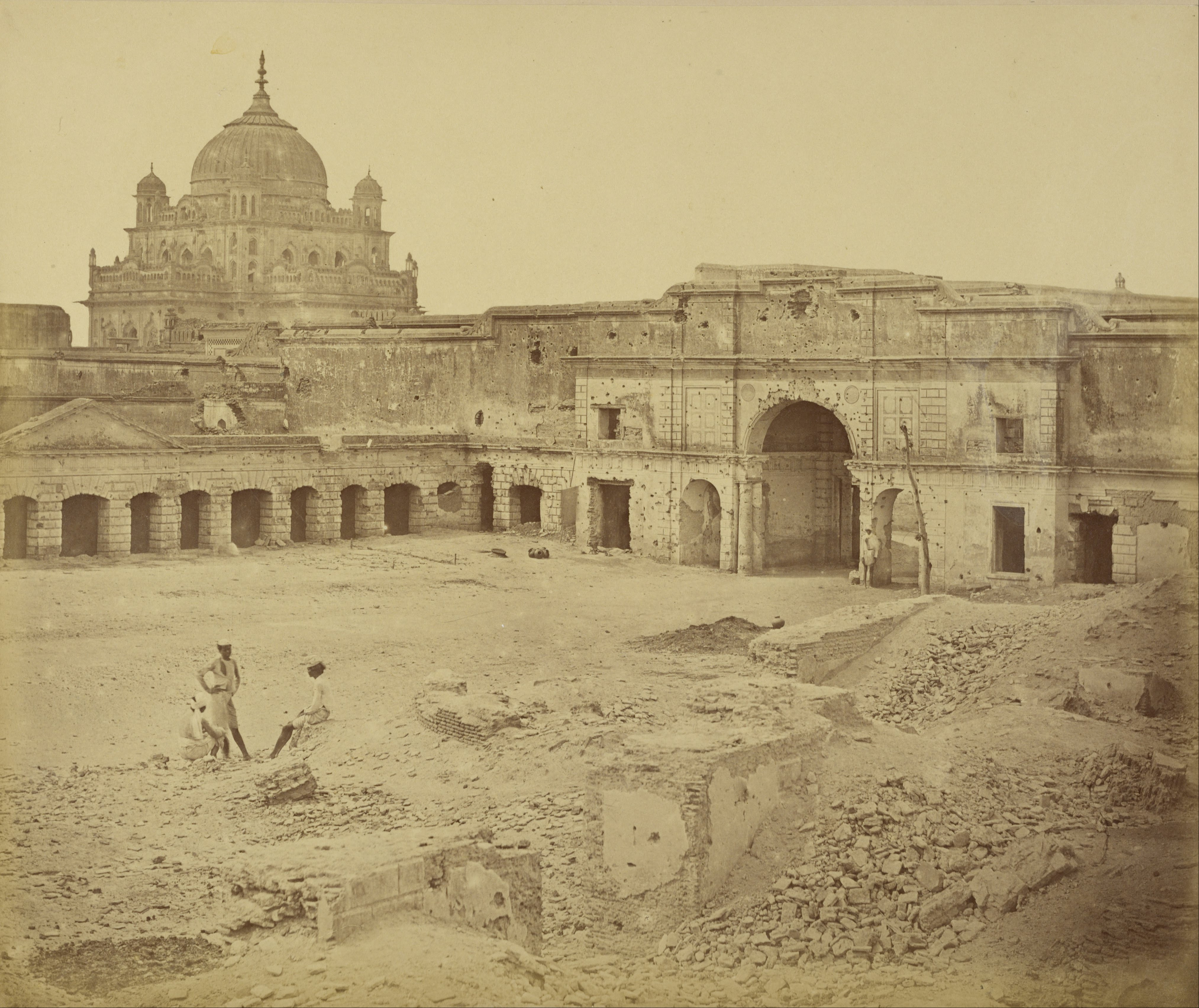
The place in which General Neil was killed in the Chinese Bazaar, Qaisar Bagh, photograph by Felice Beato

In spite of his acts of insubordination, Havelock gave his rival a brigade command in the final advance. The famous march from Cawnpore to Lucknow began on 18 September; on the 21st there was a sharp fight; on the 22nd incessant rain; on the 23rd intense heat. On the 23rd, the fighting opened with the assault on the Alum Bagh, Neill at the head of the leading brigade, exposing himself. The next day he was again heavily engaged, and on the 25th he led the attack on Lucknow itself. His men were entering the city when Neill was suddenly killed in action, shot in the head at Khas Bazaar.

== Memorials ==
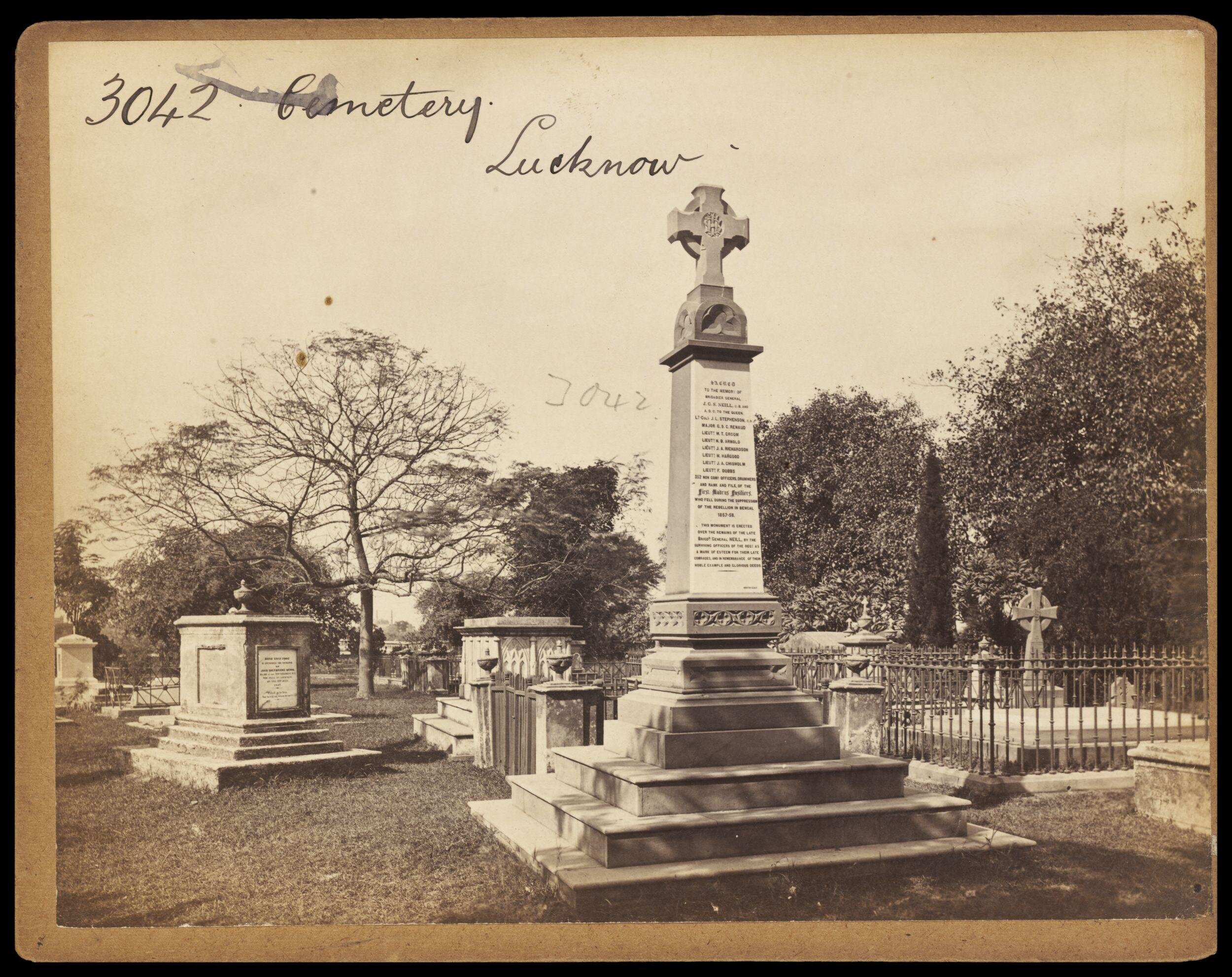
Frith's Series. 3042 Cemetery, Lucknow. (Replacement, Neill's Tomb)

The rank and precedence of the wife of a K.C.B. was given to his widow, and memorials were erected in Lucknow Cemetery and at the Auld Kirk of Ayr. The memorial at the Residency, Lucknow reads: "Sacred to the memory of Brigadier General J.G.S. Neill C.B. and A.D.C. to the Queen. Col J.L. Stephenson C.B. Major G.S.C. Renaud Lieut. W.T. Groom. Lieut N.B. Arnold. Lieut J.A. Richardson. Lieut J.A. Chisholm Lieut F. Dobbs 352 non-commissioned officers, drummers and rank and file of the First Madras Fusiliers who fell during the suppression of the rebellion in Bengal 1857-58." Identical statues by Matthew Noble were also erected in Ayr and Madras.

Neill was commemorated by having a cantonment in Lucknow named after him, "Neill Lines" (now known as Neil Lines). An island in the Andamans was named after him, as a mark of honour and now Neill Island (or Neil Island).

== See also ==
- Neil Statue Satyagraha
