= Swindridgemuir House and estate =

Coordinates: 55.7127°N 4.6764°W

- Location within North Ayrshire
- OS grid reference: NS3195549843
- Council area: North Ayrshire
- Lieutenancy area: Ayrshire and Arran
- Country: Scotland
- Sovereign state: United Kingdom
- Post town: Dalry
- Police: Scotland
- Fire: Scottish
- Ambulance: Scottish
- Scottish Parliament: Cunninghame North

Swindridgemuir House and estate were composed of the 'Lands of Swindridgemuir' and the dwelling house about two miles north-east of Dalry in the old Barony of Kersland, about a mile and a half north of the Blair Estate, North Ayrshire, Scotland. The spelling on the family memorials at Ayr Auld Kirk is 'Swindrigemuir'.

== History ==
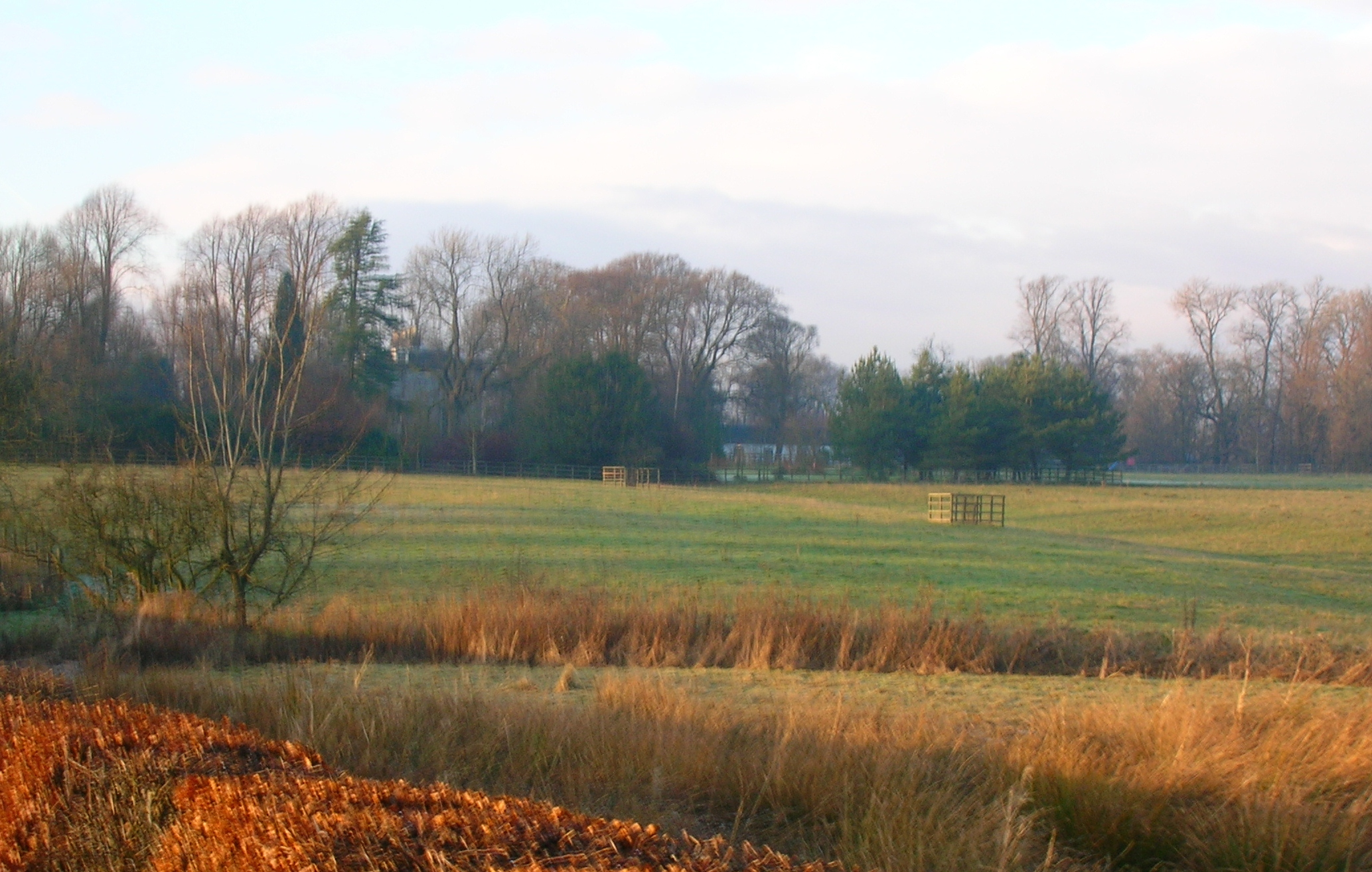
Swindridgemuir policies

A circa 1604 map shows a 'Swinmikmeur'. The name 'Swanrig' is given on the 1747 Roy's Map In 1821 the name is given as 'Swinerigemoor', 'Swindridgemuir' in 1828, and in 1832 on John Thomson's map as 'Swindridgmuir'. Swans, Swine and Whin are therefore possible elements of the placename at different times. The name 'Swinridgemuir' is used in the 19th century and 'Swindridgemuir' is found on the 20th-century family gravestone at Barnweill Kirk and 'Swindrigemuir' at the family's burial ground at Ayr Auld Kirk.

=== Swindridgemuir House ===
The neat box-like mansion house of circa 1830 is A-listed and is similar in architectural style to Ladyland House and also to Monkcastle House which was built circa 1820. Swindridgemuir was probably designed by the architect David Hamilton and has two storeys, and three bays with an ionic columned porch.

Detached buildings are shown at the back of the main mansion building. A large raised lawn area is indicated to the south-west of the mansion house, a possible site of the original dwelling house.

==== Estate ====
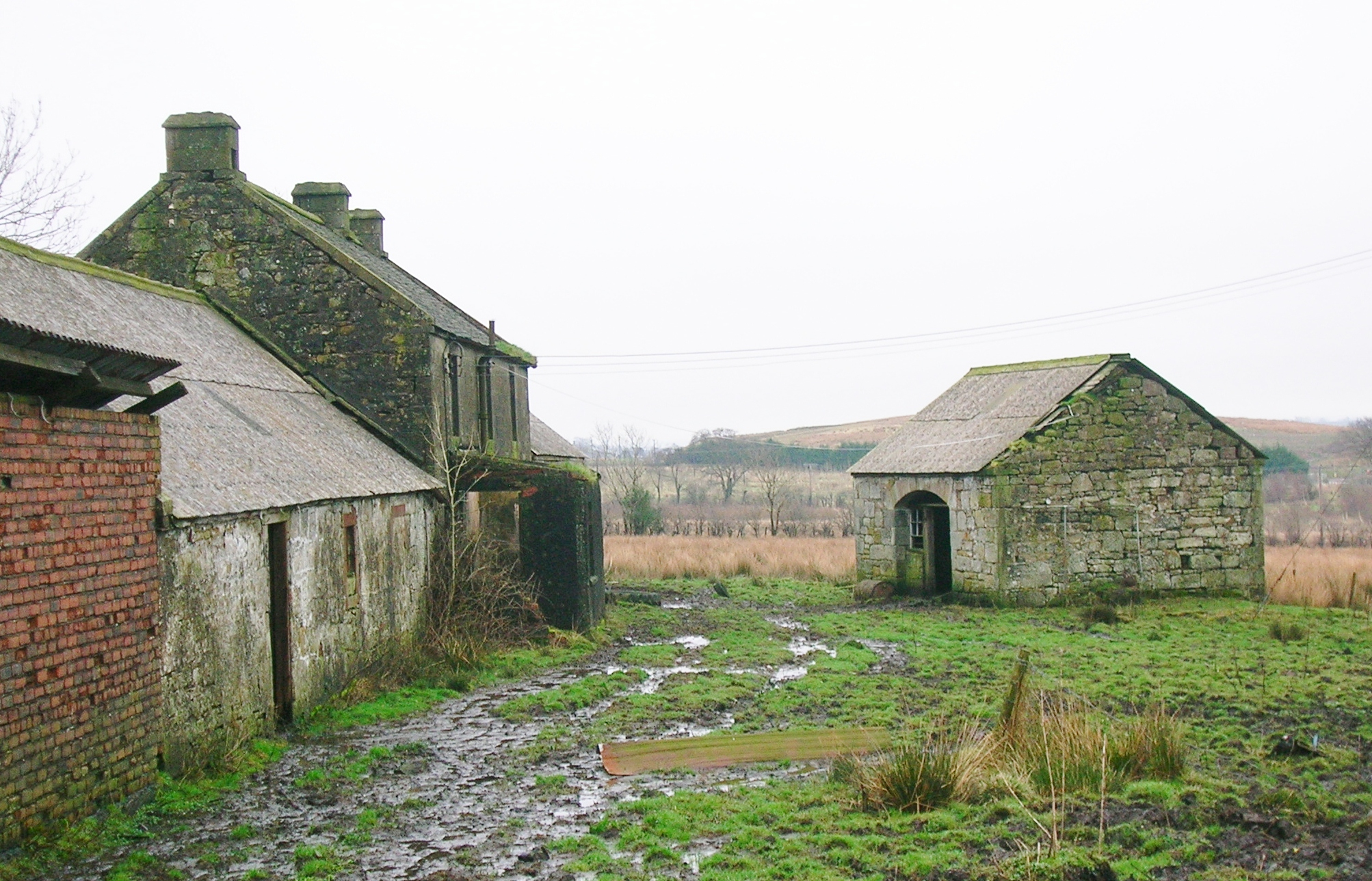
High Swindridgemuir Farm remains

The B-listed 19th-century stables (NS3195649904) form a square with a large quadrangle. The walled garden was unusually large with the southern end running at an acute angle to the east and west parallel walls. This area later contains a tennis court (datum 2012) and a small building or shed occupied a corner at the north-east. Several outbuildings and greenhouses were present in the 19th century as well as a probable horse gin.

An old lane runs past the policies up to Wheatyfauld Farm, Park Terrace, Highden and beyond. Unusually the house had no entrance lodges.

Part of the Auchinmade lands were included within the Swindridgemuir estate in 1874. The superiority of Aiket Castle was purchased by John Smith of Swinridgemuir (sic) and by 1874 had passed to his grand-nephew Major James George Smith-Neil of Barnweill and Swinridgemuir.

The 1896 OS map shows a small dam and a pool at the Swindridgemuir Spout, said to have been a small trout fishery.

=== Owners ===
A James Hammill is recorded as living at Swinrickmuir (sic) in the parish of Dalry in 1666.

The Smith family held the lands of Swindridgemuir, Auchingree, and others for several centuries, principally under a mortgage arrangement.

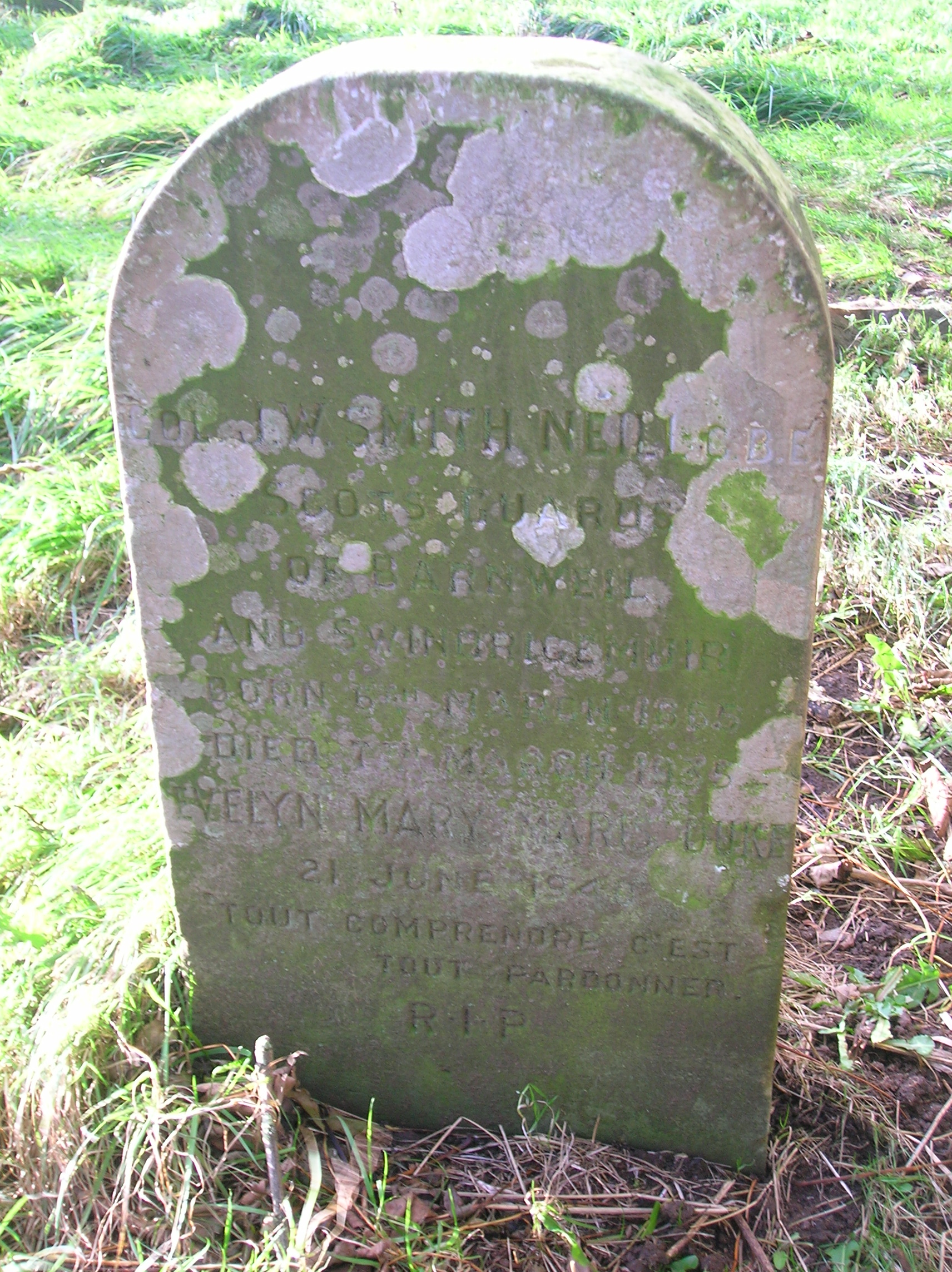
The gravestone of J. W. Smith Neill CBE of Barnweil and Swindridgemuir

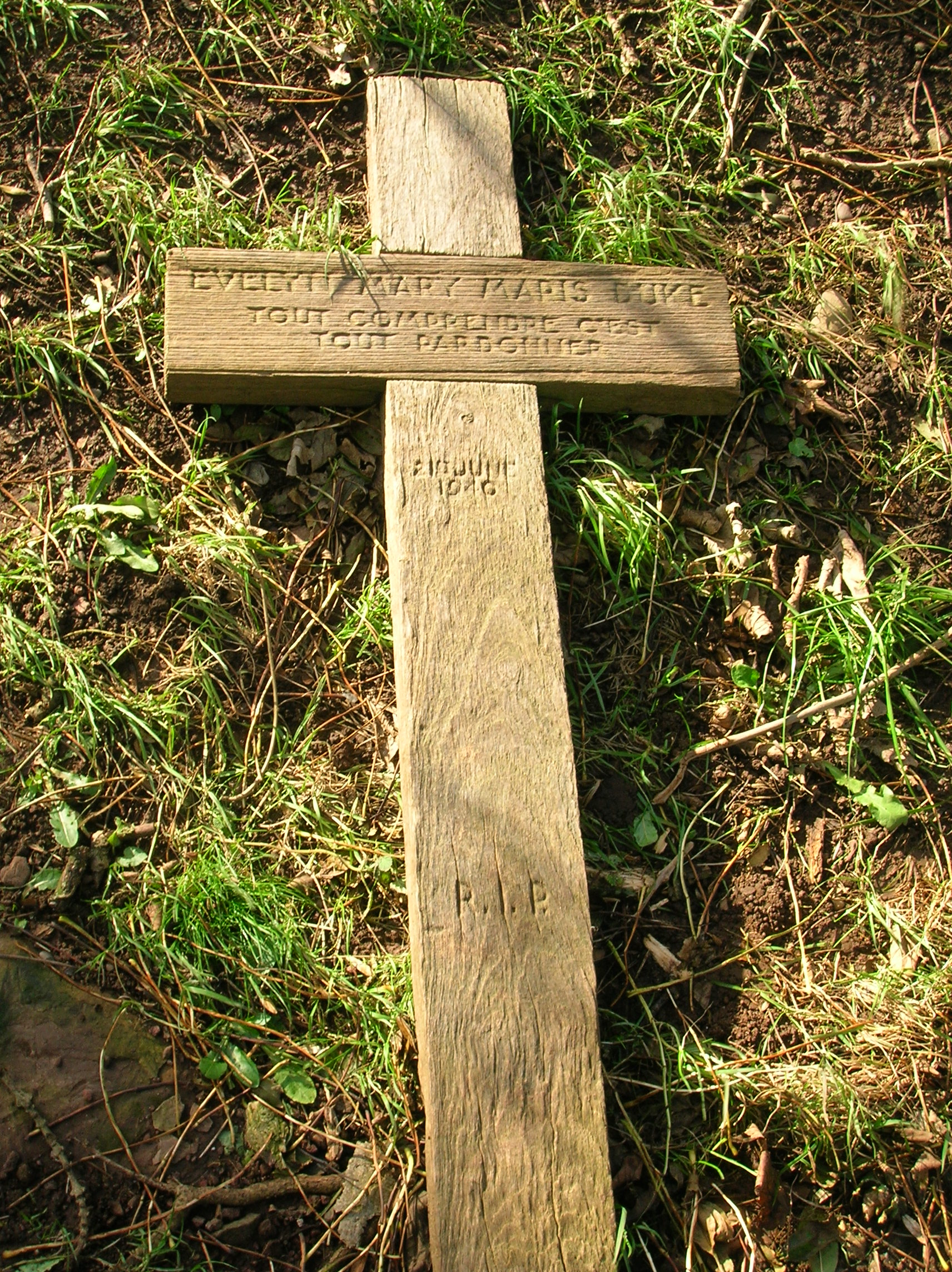
Wooden cross commemorating Evelyn Duke, wife of J. W. Smith Neill

Andrew Smith obtained an absolute right to the lands in about 1700 from John Kerr of Kersland and his wife Anna Kerr. His son Andrew succeeded and married Elizabeth Cuninghame of Wattieston and Windyhill, cadets of the ancient family of Cuninghame of Glengarnock. Another Andrew Smith inherited the property from his father of the same name and married a Marion Cochrane of Barcosh in 1753.

John Smith (1754–1838) was the eldest son of Andrew Smith and served for some years in the army, but at the termination of the American War of Independence he was placed on half pay and decided to retire and turn his attention to agricultural improvements, also purchasing various properties in the area and building the present mansion house. His sister Margaret married William Neill who had purchased the estate of Barnweill Circa 1801 this John Smith purchased the mid-superiority of Kersland.

When John Smith died in 1838, his nephew Captain William Neill of Barnweill in the Parish of Craigie inherited on the condition that he assumed the name 'Smith', thus becoming 'Smith-Neill' of Barnweill and Swinridgemuir. In 1850 Major James George Smith-Neill inherited the estate from his father, Colonel William Smith-Neill's.

In 1857, after the death of his father at Lucknow, Captain William James Smith-Neill of Barnweill, Swinridgemuir, and Kersland R.A. inherited the estates amounting to around 1275 acres. His son was James William Smith-Neill. In 1874 Captain W. J. Smith Neil was the owner of Swindridgemuir estate. J. W. Smith Neill CBE born in 1855, died in 1935 and his wife Evelyn died in 1947, both are buried in the Barnweil churchyard.

==== Brigadier-General James George Smith-Neill ====
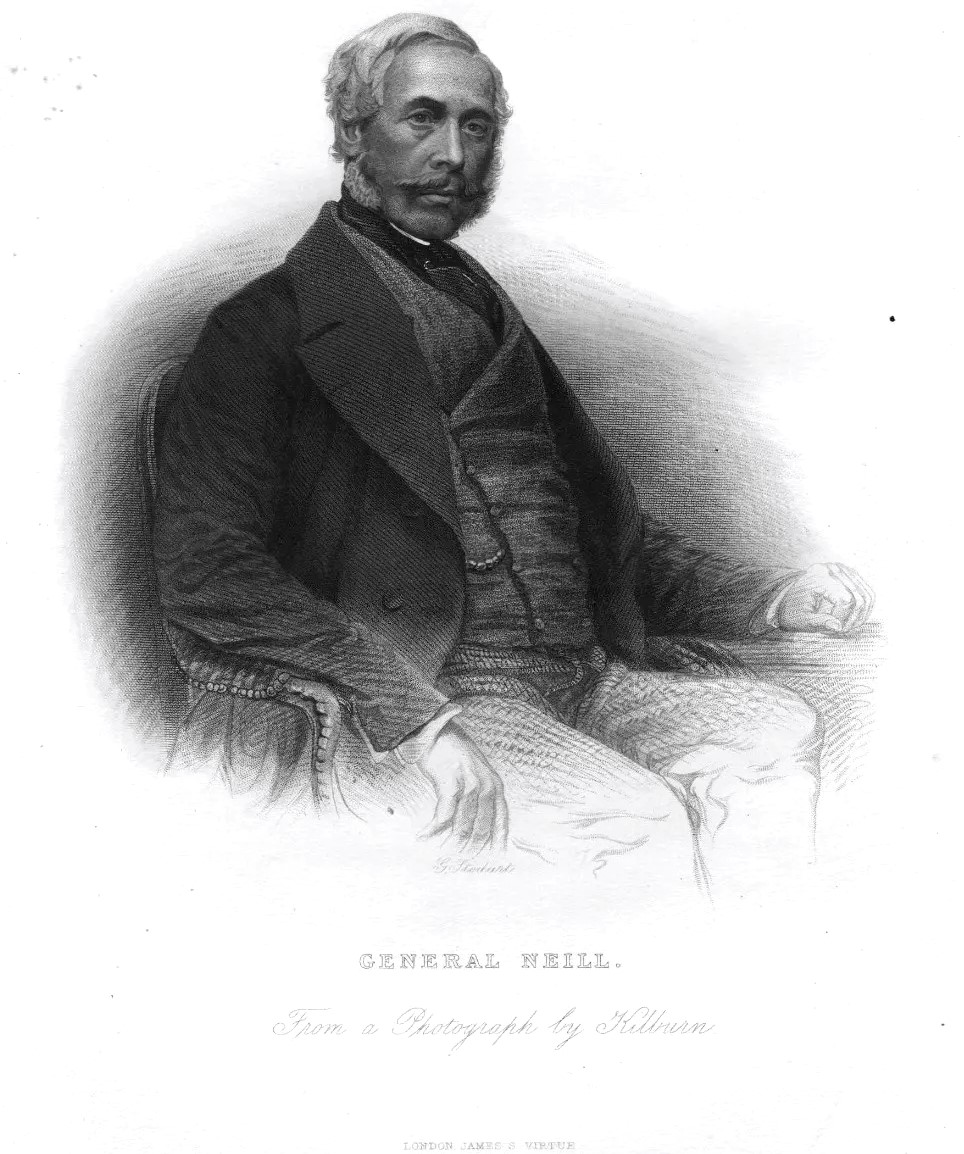
Brigadier-General Neill

Colonel William Smith-Neill's eldest son was Brigadier-General James George Smith-Neill (1810–1857). He entered the service of the East India Company and fought in the second Burmese War, then fought against Russia before fighting in the Indian Mutiny where he routed the mutineers at Benares and reinforced Allahabad. He was killed at Lucknow on 25 September 1857 during the final assault. His statue is to be found at the Wellington Square in Ayr and his bust is to be found in the Dalry parish church. The widow of James Smith-Neill was made a Dame-Commander of the Most Honourable Military Order of the Bath of the Bath. Neil Island is an island in the Andaman Islands of India apparently named after him. As a British soldier responsible for several war crimes during the suppression of the 1857 Mutiny and the sobriquet 'Butcher of Allahabad' his reputation has unsurprisingly suffered in modern times. The house passed to Rosamund Parker - Viscountess Hanworth, after the Second World War. It was damaged after being requisitioned by the Government and was not considered worthy of becoming a National Trust property. On her marriage to David Bertram Pollock, Viscount Hanworth she disposed of the home and the Pollock family moved to Folly Hill, Ewhurst, Surrey.

== Agricultural improvements ==
John Smith received an award from the Highland Society of Scotland in recognition of his "ingenuity and perseverance in discovering a principle, and introducing the practice of converting peat moss into very productive soil". Aiton states that John Smith Esq. of Swineridgemuir (sic) taught his tenants and neighbours how to improve peat moss and even published a pamphlet in 1797 ...which has done much good and which was often quoted, copies, or referred to in almost every publication from that time regarding rural economy. He had begun his experiments in 1785 and recommended that potatoes should be the first crop.

== Swindridgemuir area ==
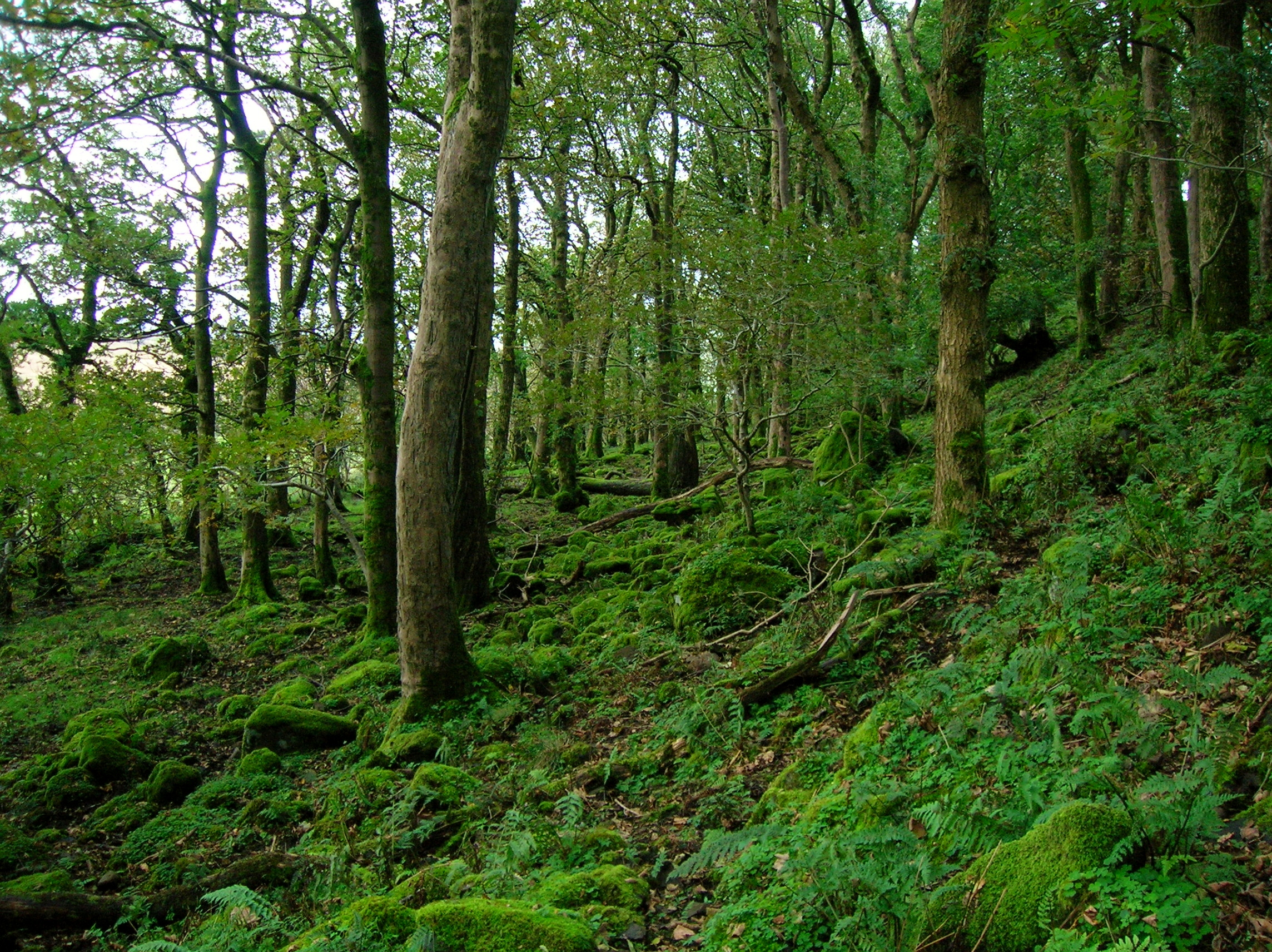
Rabbie's Well Wood at the Middlebank Plantation

The Bombo Burn runs under the nearby road at the Swindridgemuir Bridge and this road continues past Kerslochmuir Farm and the settlement at Bellstone Cottages. Johnson's 1828 map gives the local names as Bowtrapping, Lochmuir, and Belstane.

=== Robert Burns ===
John Smith of Swindridgemuir relates in a letter of 1829 that Dr Mackenzie was present with him at a social occasion at Robertland, hosted by Sir William Cunningham, at which Robert Burns was present. A discussion took place about the identity of Tam o'Shanter during which the poet revealed that one Douglas Grahame was the individual upon whom Tam was modelled.

The origin of the name Rabbie's Well and Rabbie's Brae below West Middlebank Farm is unknown.

Relatives of Robert Burns' friend John Davidson, his 'Souter Johnnie', once lived at High Swindridgemuir Farm and donated a cup and saucer that once belonged to him to the Irvine Burns Club.

=== Micro-history ===
The Neills of Barnweil were descended from the MacNeills of Barra who had settled in Ayrshire circa 1550.

In 1826 John Smith was the Grand Master of the Kilwinning Mother Lodge.

A memorial at Barnweill Church to Col J W Neil Smith of Barnweill and Swindridgemuir also bears the details of his wife Evelyn Mary Mapis Duke who died on June 21, 1940. 'Tout comprendre c'est tout pardonner' is carved on this stone and on a smaller wooden cross that bears her details alone.

A public path exists at the High Swindridgemuir Wood.
