= Two and a half cent coin =

Two and a half cent coin may refer to:

- Two and a half cent coin (Netherlands)
- Two and a half cent coin (United States)
- 2½ cents (World War II Dutch coin)
