= Two and a half cent coin (Netherlands) =

Coin struck in the Netherlands between 1818 and 1942

The two and a half cent coin (worth half a stuiver or four duit) was struck in the Kingdom of the Netherlands between 1818 and 1942. All coins were minted in Utrecht.

== Dimensions and weight ==
Dimensions	2 1/2 cents 1877–1941	2 1/2 cents 1941–1942	Refs
Mass	4 g	2 g	
Diameter	23.69 mm (1877–1898); 23.5 mm (1903–1906); 23 mm (1912–1941)	20 mm	
Thickness	1.1 mm (1903–1906); 1 mm (1912–1941)	? mm	
Metal	Bronze	Zinc	

== Versions ==
Monarch	Mint	Material	Obverse	Reverse	Edge	Minting years	Refs
William III	Utrecht	Bronze	Crowned lion with sword and quiver	Value between two bonded orange branches	Reeded with no edge lettering	1877, 1880, 1881, 1883, 1884, 1886, 1890	
Wilhelmina	Utrecht	Bronze	Crowned lion with sword and quiver (bigger mint master mark)	Value between two bonded orange branches	Reeded with no edge lettering	1894, 1898	
Wilhelmina	Utrecht	Bronze	Crowned lion with sword and quiver (smaller mint and mint master mark)	Value between two bonded orange branches	Reeded with no edge lettering	1903–1906	
Wilhelmina	Utrecht	Bronze	Crowned lion with sword and quiver (different crown and bigger lettering)	Value between two bonded orange branches (different orange branches and bigger lettering)	Reeded with no edge lettering	1912–1916, 1918, 1919, 1929, 1941	
German occupation coin	Utrecht	Zinc	Frisian owl board	Value with four waves and two cereal ears	Smooth with no edge lettering	1941, 1942	

== Gallery ==
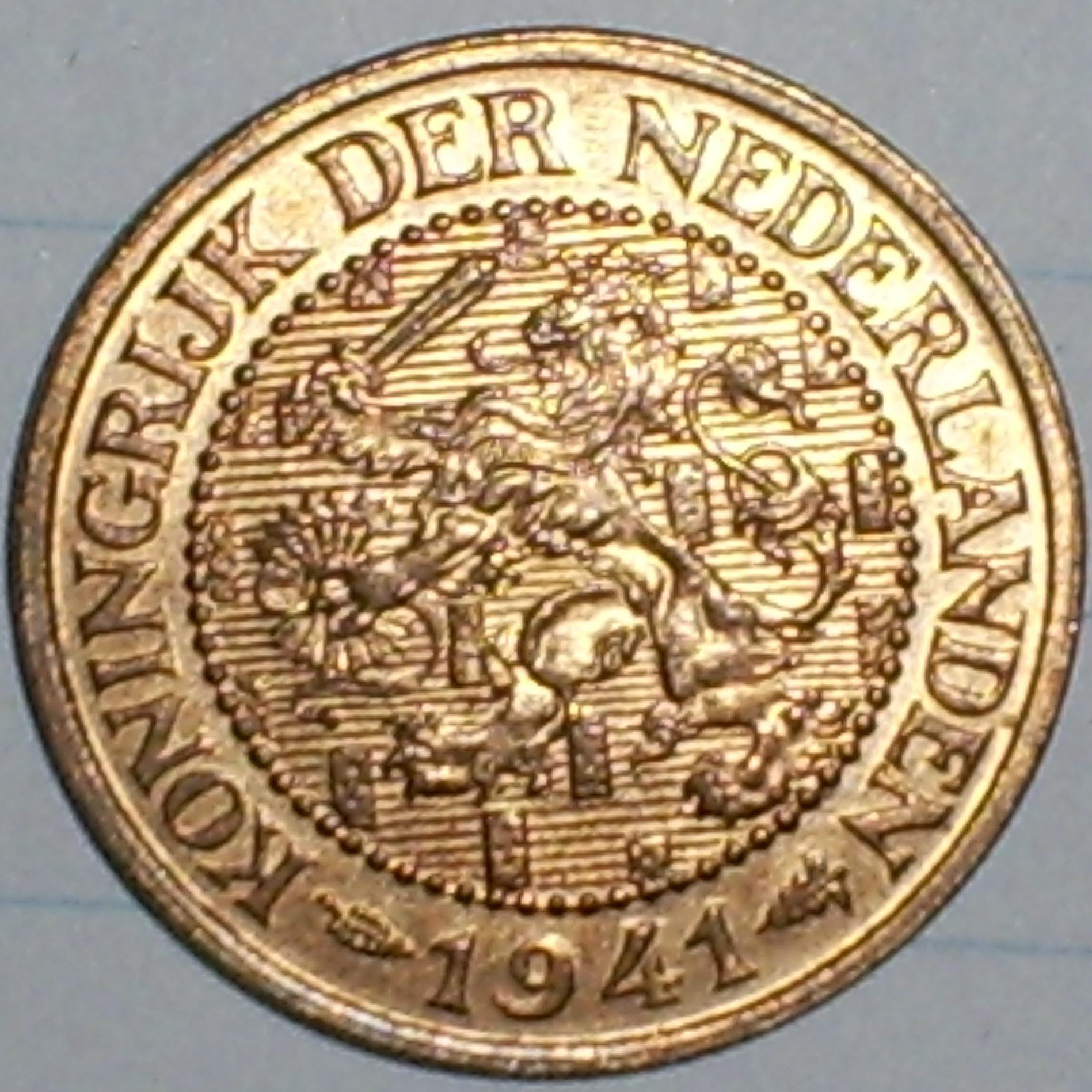
Obverse 2 1/2 cent, 1941.

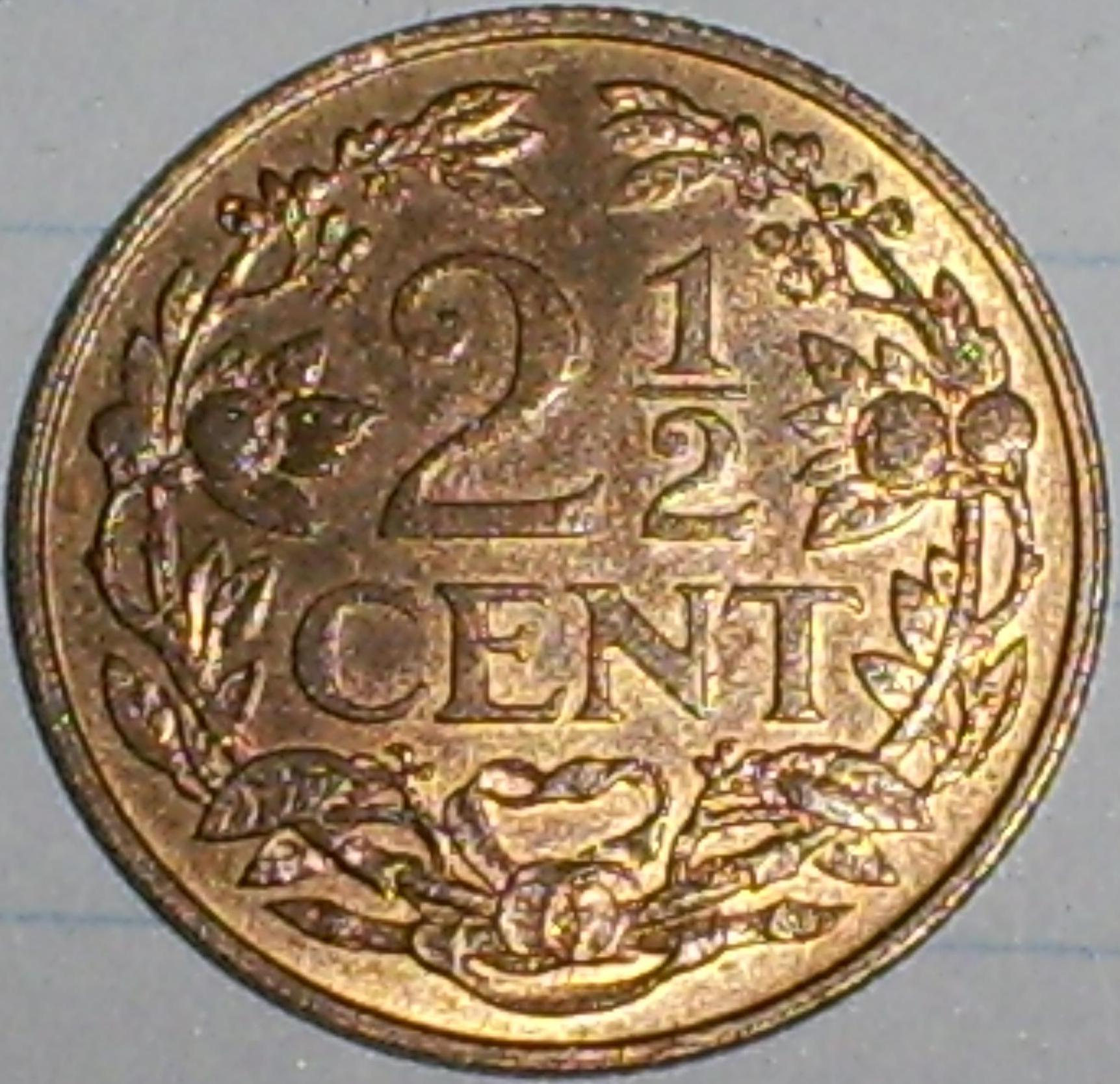
Reverse 2 1/2 cent, 1941.

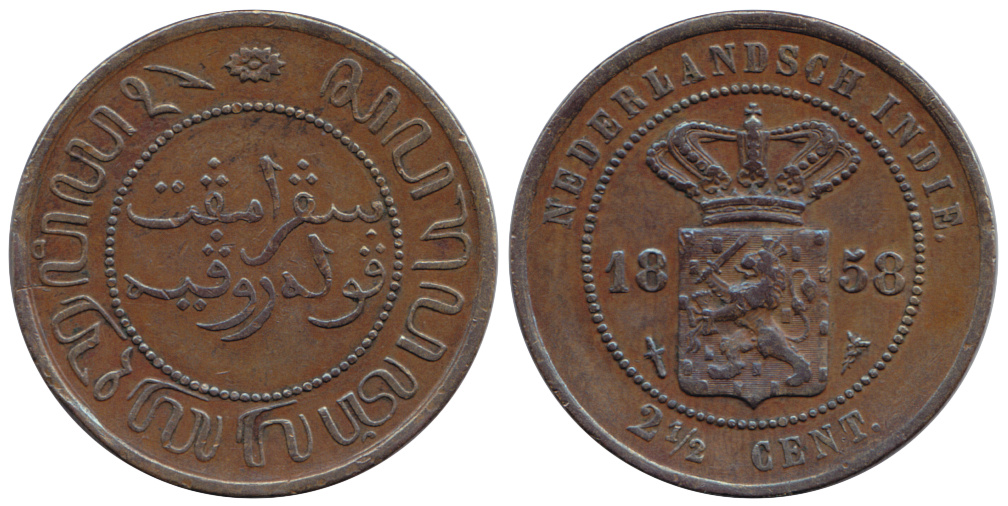
2 1/2 cents 1858 minted for the Dutch East Indies.
