= The Lands of Roughwood =

Farm in North Ayrshire, Scotland

Roughwood
- Beith, North Ayrshire, Scotland; UK grid reference NS 34568 52261
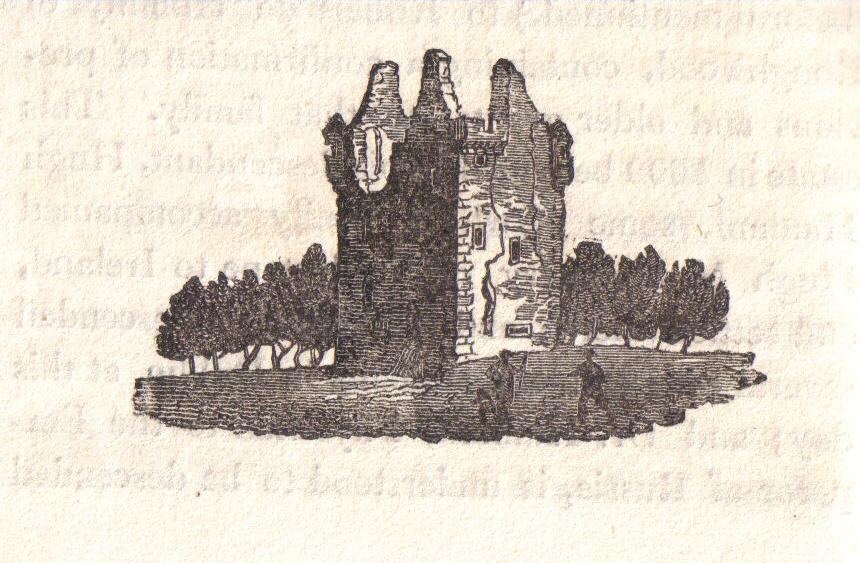
- Roughwood Tower

Site information
- Type: Tower
- Owner: Private
- Open to the public: No
- Condition: Removed, the farm buildings remain.

Location
- Shown within Scotland
- Coordinates: 55.735414°N 4.636377°W

Site history
- Built: 15th century
- In use: Until 17th century
- Materials: Stone

Roughwood once Ruchwood is a farm, originally an estate, possessing at one time a small tower castle. Roughwood is situated near to the town of Beith in North Ayrshire, Scotland; the lands lay within the old Lordship of Giffen.

== The history of Roughwood ==
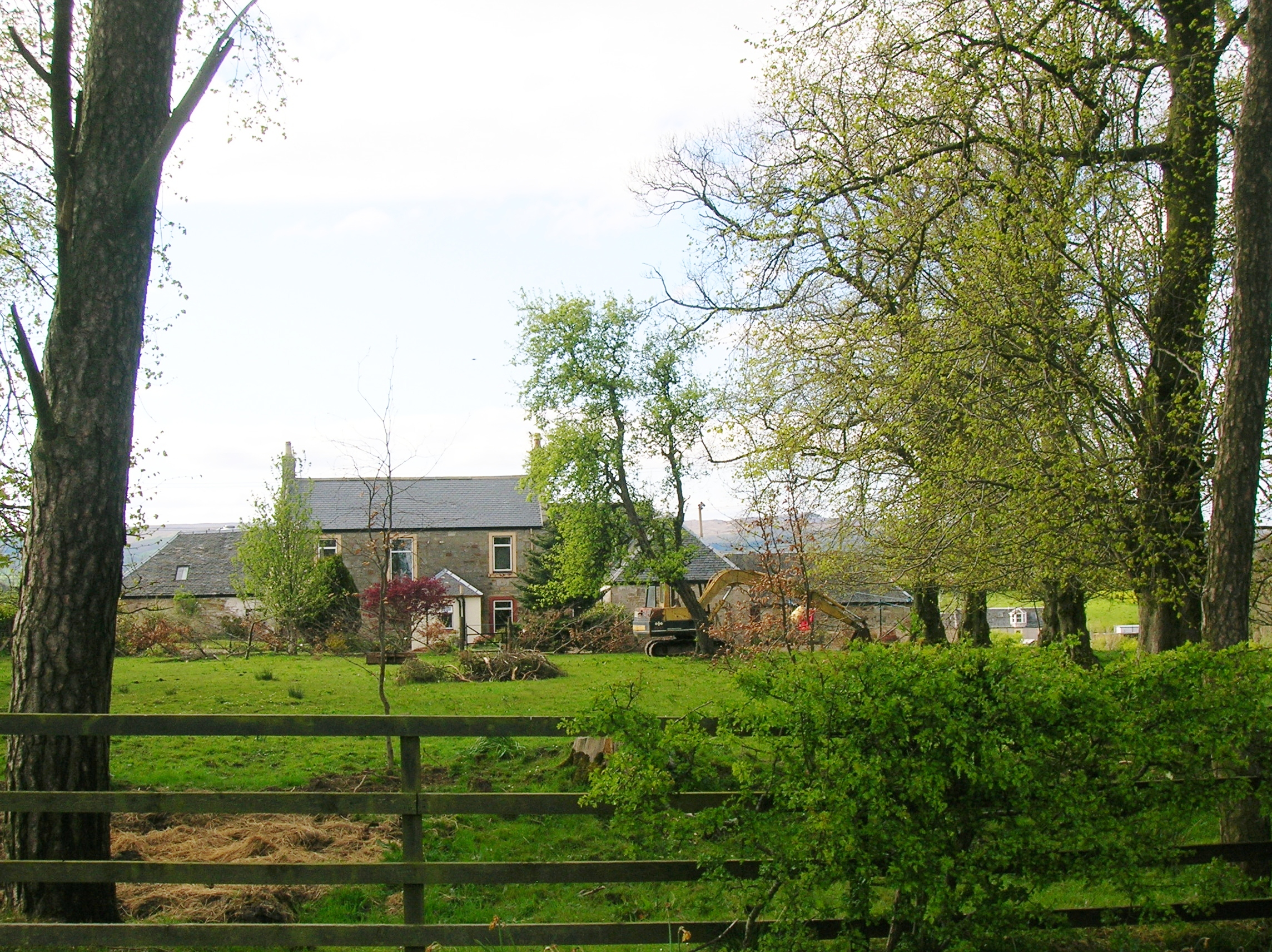
Roughwood Farm

The name 'Ruch' in Scot's relates to ground that is "difficult to traverse; broken, uneven; covered with tussocky vegetation or the like". The lands consisted of 160 acres in Beith parish and 85 in Dalry parish. No improvements had been made on these lands, mainly composed of moss and clay, since 1770 and they were in a very poor state, with no roads, farm-houses ruinous, and few enclosures when acquired by the Patricks.

=== The Barony Court ===
The Baron Courts were held at Roughwood by the Hammills or their baillies as it is recorded that a court was held at Roughwood on 25 June 1724 with William Ralston of that Ilk acting as bailie for Hugh Hammill. In August 1725 Henry Adam of Morshill was bailie, however in May 1740 Robert Shedden was bailie to John Shedden, Hugh Hammill having passed on the lands, rights and privileges permanently to the Sheddens and their heirs. In 1836 it is recorded that the Earl of Eglinton had discontinued the appointment of a Baron Bailie and a Baron Officer and the Barony Court had therefore ceased to function.

=== The old tower ===
The castle was a simple fortified keep. These defensive towers usually had an entrance on the ground floor, giving access to a wheel-stair to the first floor hall and to cellars or stores on the ground floor. The hall on the first floor usually had a large fireplace and window seats. The illustration is nearly or actually identical to that used for other tower castles, such as Busbie Castle.

The old manor house or fortified tower of Ruchwood (sic) had a coat of arms of the Hammill family on the front bearing quarterly "a star (or mullet) of five points; a crescent; a shakefork, the same as the Cuninghame; and a fleur-de-lis." The colours were not apparent at that time. This shield had a crest above, again a fleur-de-lis. Half of the old tower was removed to make room for modern improvements; however, in the half that remained an old doorway was retained, surrounded by a cut moulding. This coat of arms may be the same one that was present in the interior in the upper storey over a small fireplace in the left of the gable. These armorial bearings are reported as being very worn with the date '14' in the left-hand lower corner and 1st and 3rd quarters obliterated.

=== The farm ===
Mr Patrick built a road through his lands, rebuilt the farm-houses, created enclosures, and added plantations that survive to this day. The Spiersland Way is an old road, now only suitable now for farm vehicles, that runs down from the old 'Craig View' house near Bellscauseway to Burnside Cottage next to Roughwood Bridge and the Powgree Burn.

The term 'lands of Roughwood and Millburn' are used in regards of the Shedden family, however no Millburn is located nearby, this property being already associated with the Sheddens before they obtained the lands of Roughwood.

The farm may have been involved in flax dressing at one time, a retting pond is known to have existed at Windyhouse Farm and a lint mill was located on the Powgree Burn at the far end of Kersland Glen near Longbar. A room in Roughwood Farm has an unusual floor with four separately supported sides creating slopes down to a central area. This may have been the heckling shed where flax was processed and the spent material, called 'tow', was collected for further use in stuffing pillows, etc or simply for removal as it was highly combustible and fires in heckling shops were common.

=== Cartographic evidence ===
Blaeu's 1654 map based on Timothy Ponts map of the early 1600s marks a 'Ruchwood' as a dwelling rather than a fortified dwelling. Roy's map of 1747 shows the settlement of Roughwood, close to a Lang Hithrig or Hillrig. Armstrong's 1775 map marks a 'Raewood' close to a large area of moorland or bog. Thomson's map of 1832 shows Roughwood standing off a crossroad junction, a dwelling marked as 'Myre' situated where the later limestone quarry was established. The 1856 25 in. to the mile OS map shows a limestone quarry in the area of the 'Myre' dwelling and limestone kilns, together with extensive shelterbelts. The 1895 OS map shows what may be a horse gin outside one of the farm buildings.

== Carvings and features ==
These unusual carvings are located on the older northern side of the farm. The fox or cat carving has no associated initials or dates. The bird is a falcon, the Ralston family crest. The painting of the animals is of recent origin. The falcon can be seen on the family memorial in Beith Cemetery (See photograph). The reason for the cockerel carving is unknown however in heraldry a cockerel represented courage and perseverance.

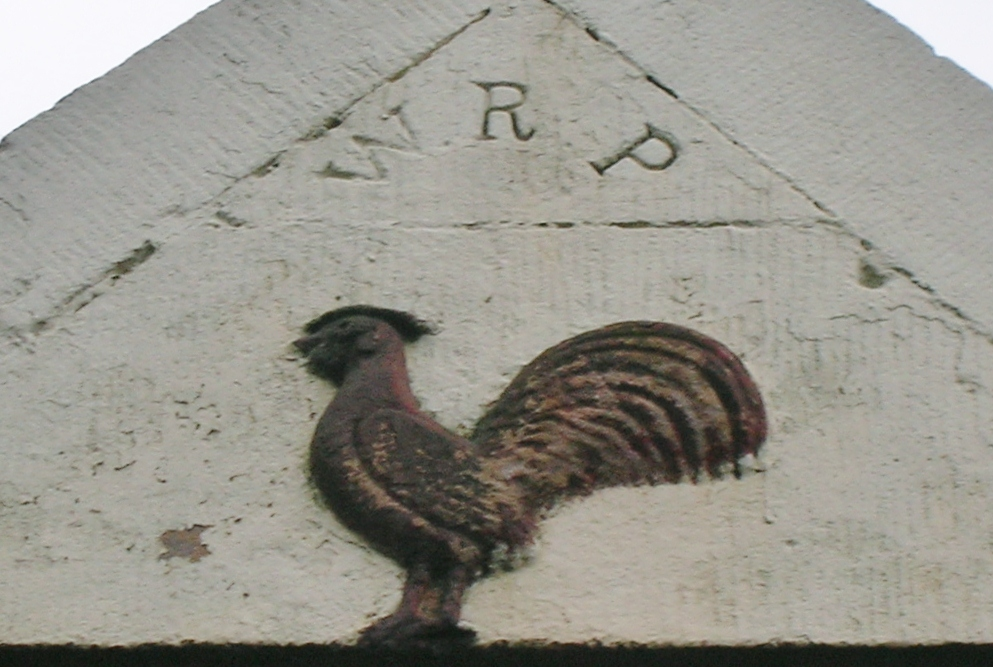
WRP (William Ralston-Patrick) and cockerel carving on the wall of the farm

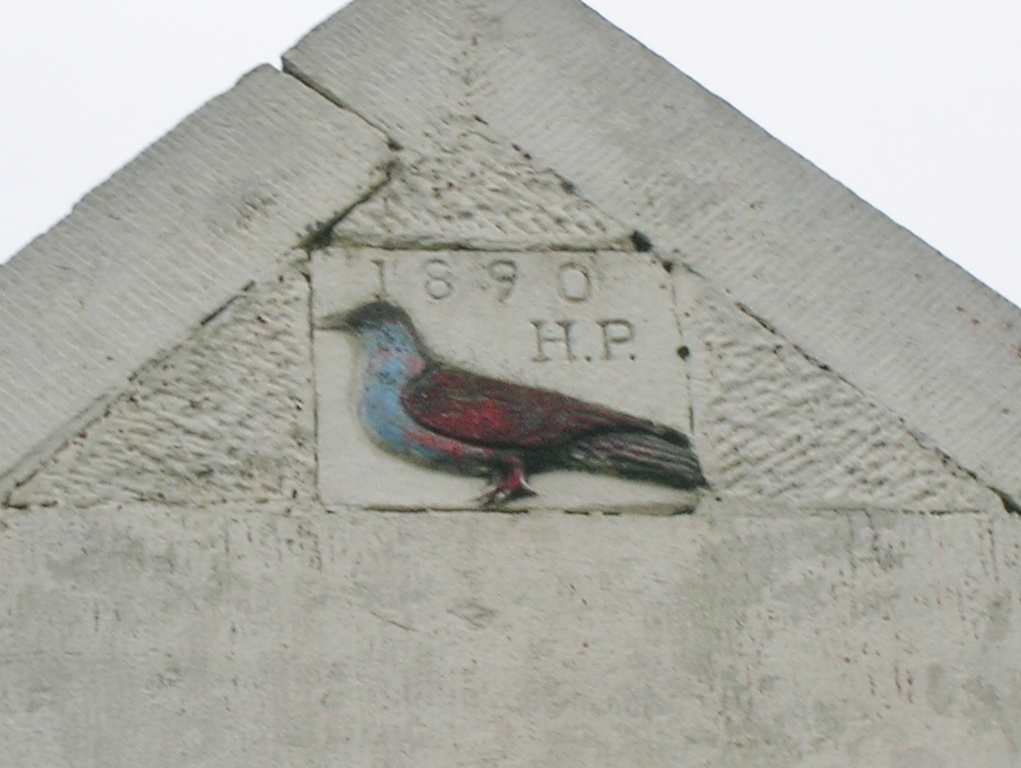
HP 1890 and a falcon, the crest of the Ralston family

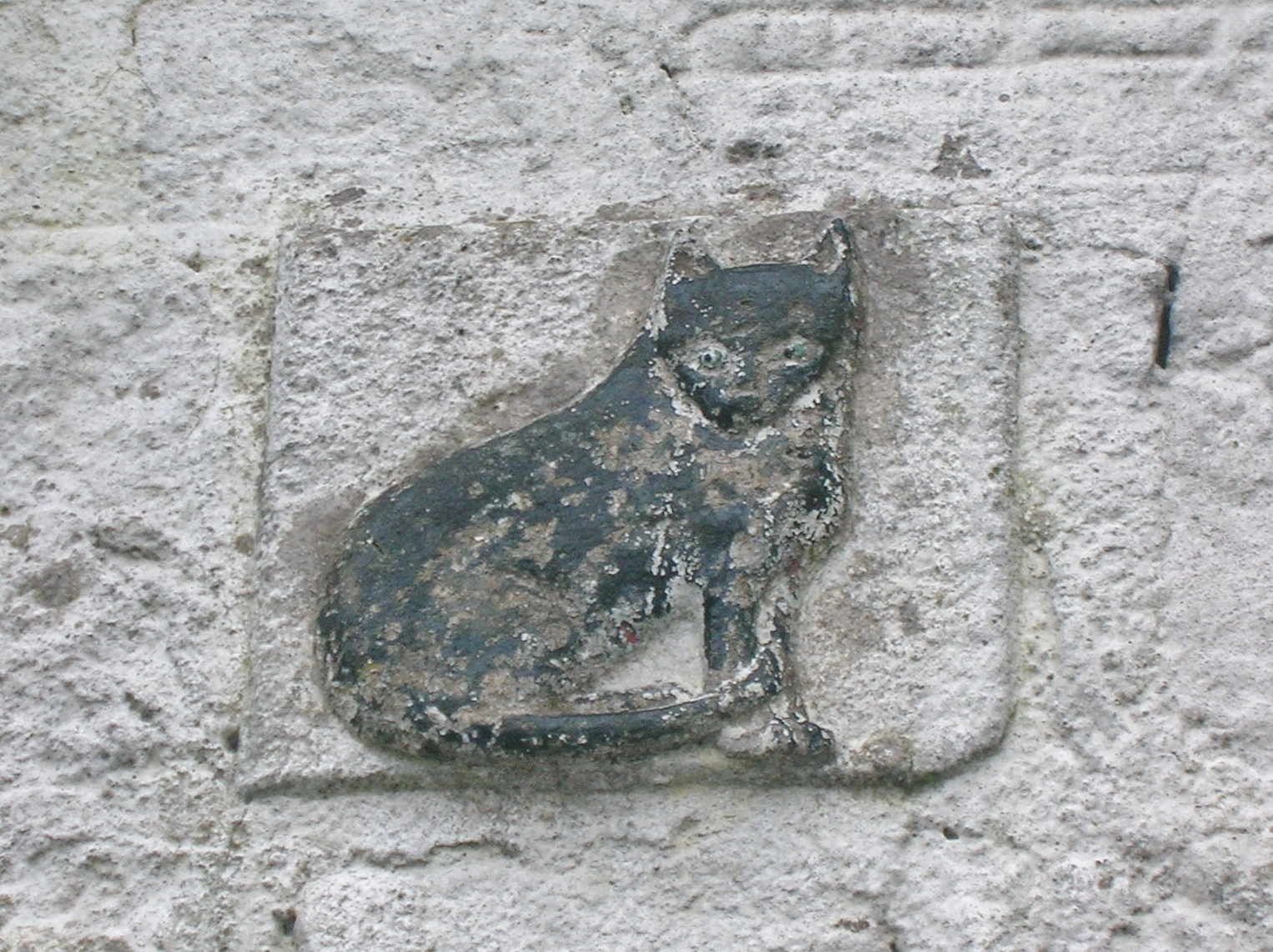
Fox carving

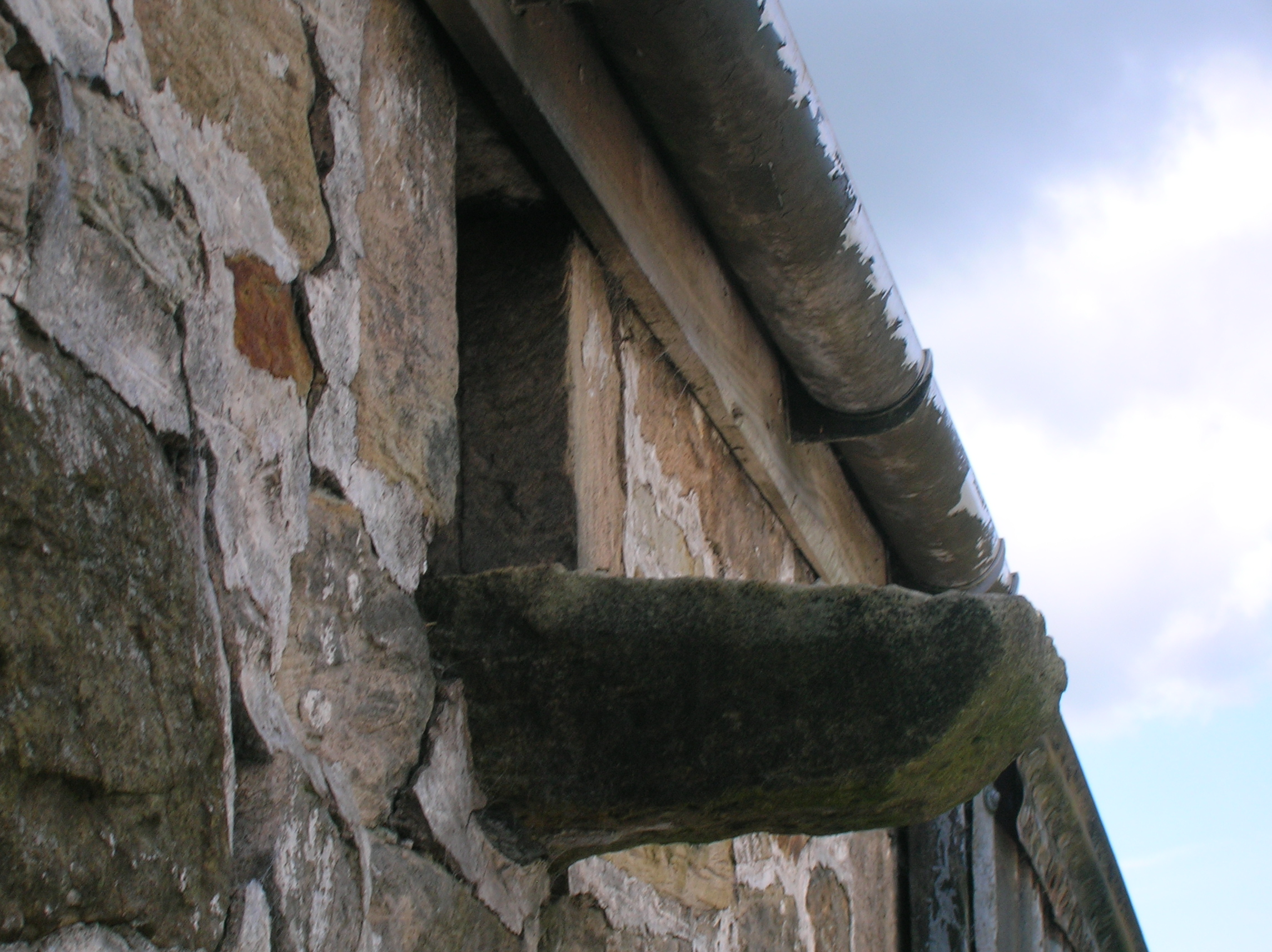
A traditional owl hole at Roughwood

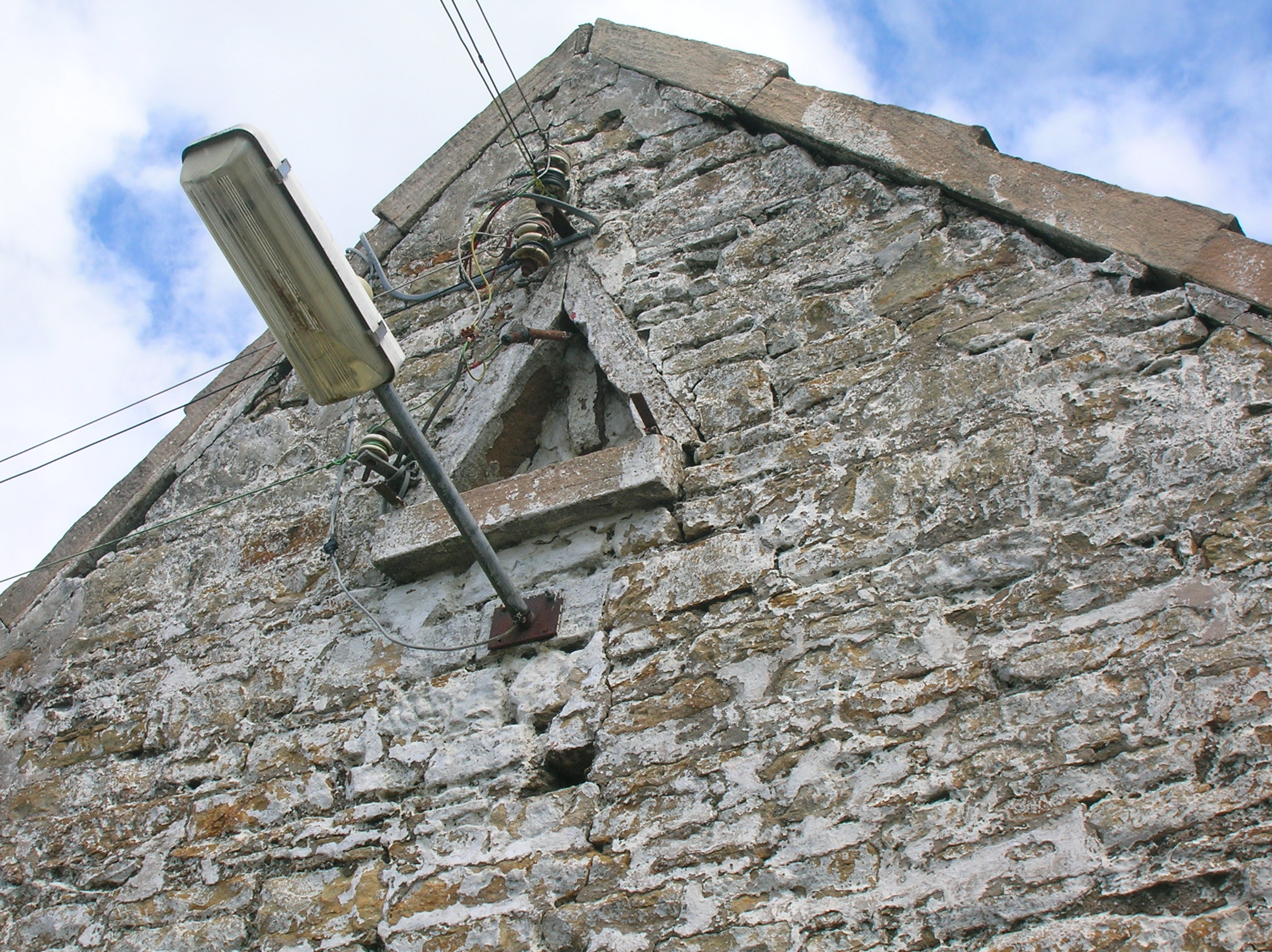
Triangular owl hole

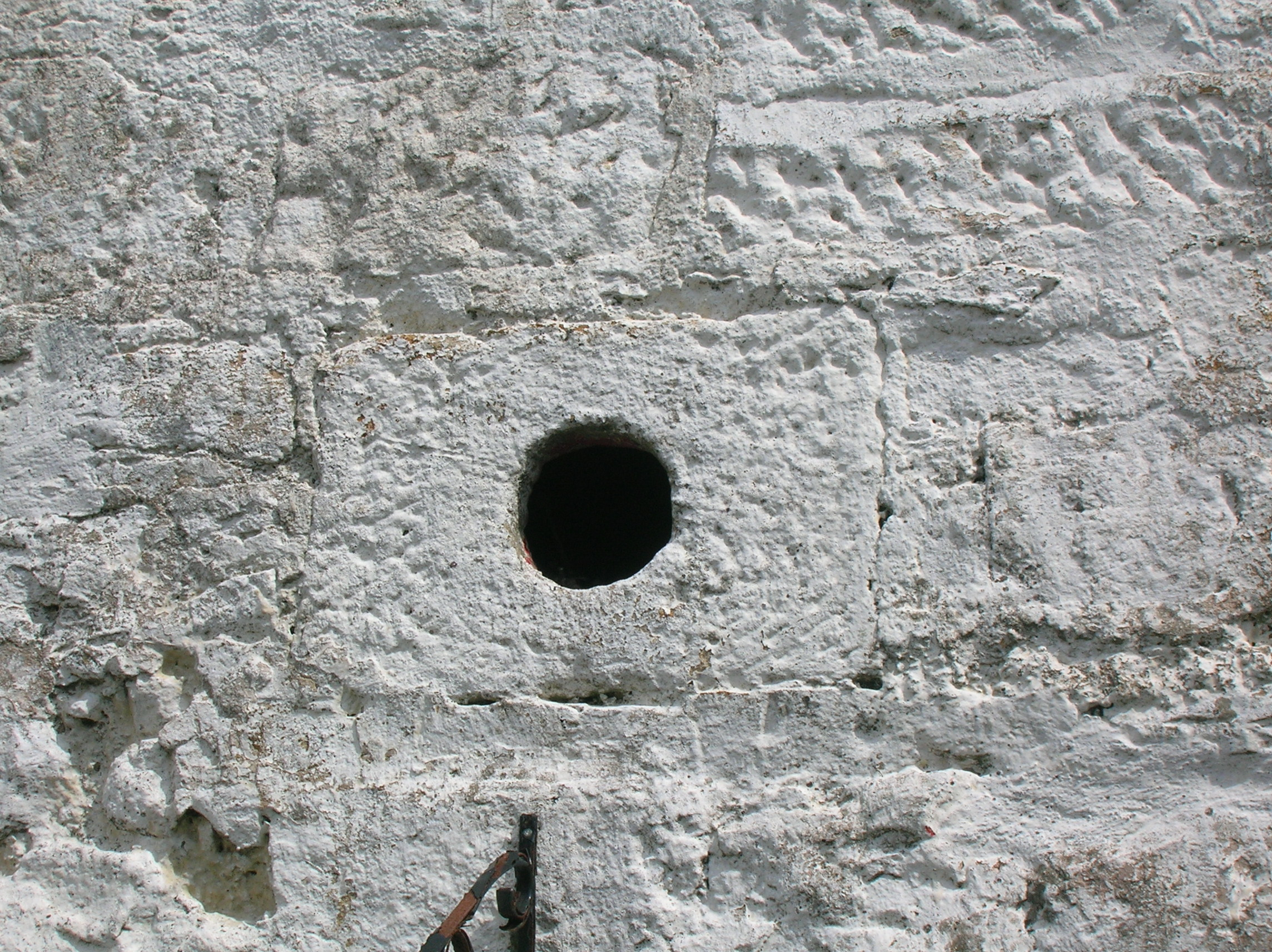
Ventilation hole at Roughwood

Roughwood has two owl holes built into farm outbuildings and the remains of a third. One is the standard design, but the other is triangular. These holes were constructed to permit access to barn owls which would also be provided with a nesting area within the building, the benefit to the farmer being that these birds would predate the rats and mice on the farm. Typically owl holes have an entry and a landing platform or perch in front. A stone used as a ventilation hole conforms to the design of a basic blind gun loop as found in fortified buildings. Blind gun loops allowed a defender to fire a gun from within; however, the view through this design of gun loop was limited. Dressing on some of the ashlar stone blocks suggest that they were prepared for a harling surface, the equivalent of modern roughcast, typically found on tower castles.

== Associated families ==
=== The Hammils ===
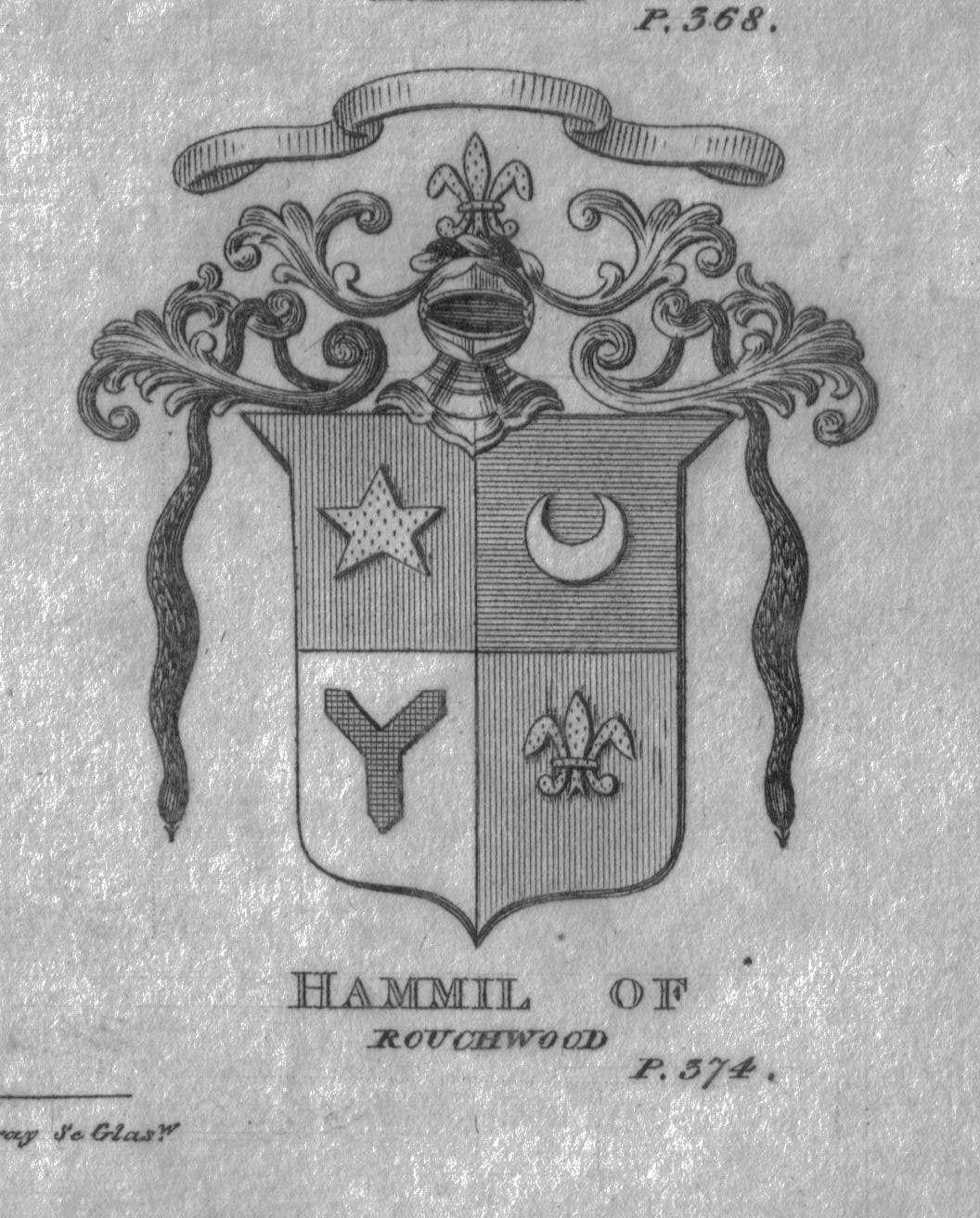
Coat of arms of the Hammil family

A Walter de Hamule is recorded as holding lands in the Lothians during the reign of William the Lion. The estate of Roughwood appears to have been separated from the Barony of Giffin before the time of Sir Hugh de Eglinton acquisition of Giffin in 1371. The grant of Roughwood (Rughwodd) lands and those of Broadstone (Bradestaneward) to Robert de Hommyl were confirmed by John de Lyddale, Dominus de Bradestane on 14 July 1452. These lands were granted in 'payment' for attendance at the three annual Head Courts. The lands remained in the family by direct male descent for eight generations. In 1600 Hugh Hammil held these lands. In 1643 Hugh married Catherine, daughter of William Ralston of that Ilk and had offspring, Matthew and Anna. This Matthew sold the estate to Robert Shedden, circa 1736, and died unmarried. His sister Anna married Robert Montgomery of nearby Craighouse. The coat of arms, as engraved on the front of the house, were "Quarterly; first, Gules, a mullet, Or; second, Azure, a crescent, Argent; third, fleur de lis, Or. The crest was a fleur de lis. The supporters were two serpents, pendant et vigilans."

Dobie has it that Hugh Hammill sold the lands of Ruchwood and Bradestaneward to Robert Shedden, rather than his son, on 23 May 1713. The Sheddens were merchants in Beith. in 1720 Catherine Peebles, the widow of Matthew Hammill of Roughwood, protested against the rights passed to the Sheddens as it would prejudice her right to living at Mains of Roughwood for the remainder of her days.

==== The Ulster connection ====
Some of the family of Hugh Hammil of Roughwood accompanied Hugh Montgomerie to Ireland and became established there as merchants in the Dublin area. Hugh Montgomery brought a colony of Irish Protestants over from his Irish estates in 1600 and later a colony of Protestants from the area were taken over to the Ardes and Clandebora areas of Ireland following the putting down of an Irish revolt. Hugh was knighted by King James in 1605, giving him precedence over his rival James Hamilton, Hugh Montgomery, 1st Viscount Montgomery (1560–1636), is known as one of the "founding fathers" of the Ulster-Scots along with James Hamilton, 1st Viscount Claneboye. Paterson, the historian, records that the 'Laird of Braidstane's Scotch Colony', established in around 1606, was responsible for the introduction of linen weaving and manufacture to the area around Lurgan in Ireland. In 1636 Hugh Hamill of Roughwood, attended the funeral of the 1st Viscount Ards in Newtownards, Ireland, as one of the principle mourners.

The Hamills mainly settled in Antrim, and the North Antrim Hamills are almost entirely descended from Hugh Hamill of Roughwood. In the Muster Rolls for Antrim taken in 1631 are recorded the following family members: Archibald, James, John (3), Hugh, John, Roger, William, living in the Barony of Dunluce and Lower Antrim (Ballymoney and Ballymena Town).

== The farm, remnants of estate plantings, etc. ==
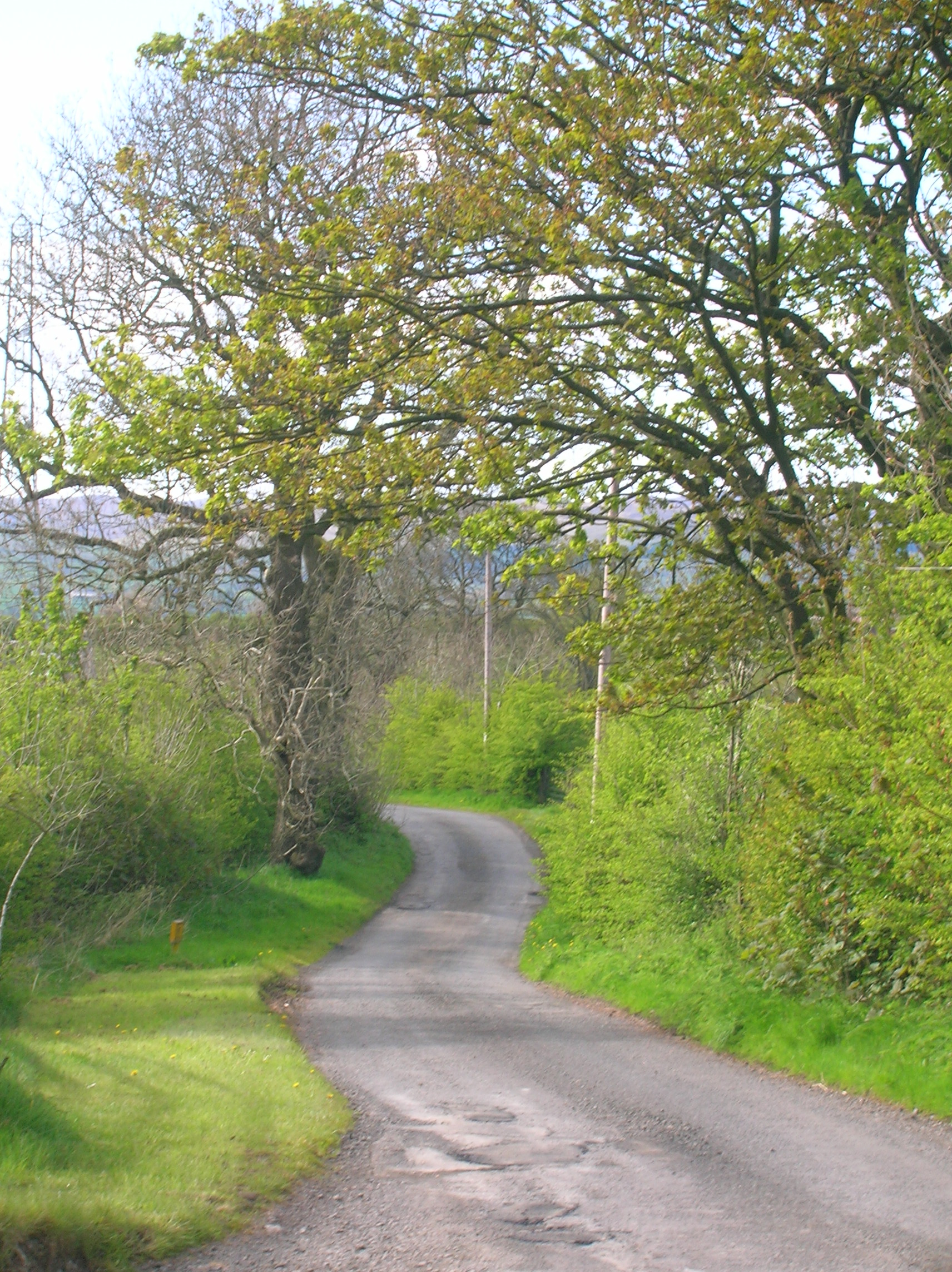
Looking towards Roughwood Bridge and Burnside

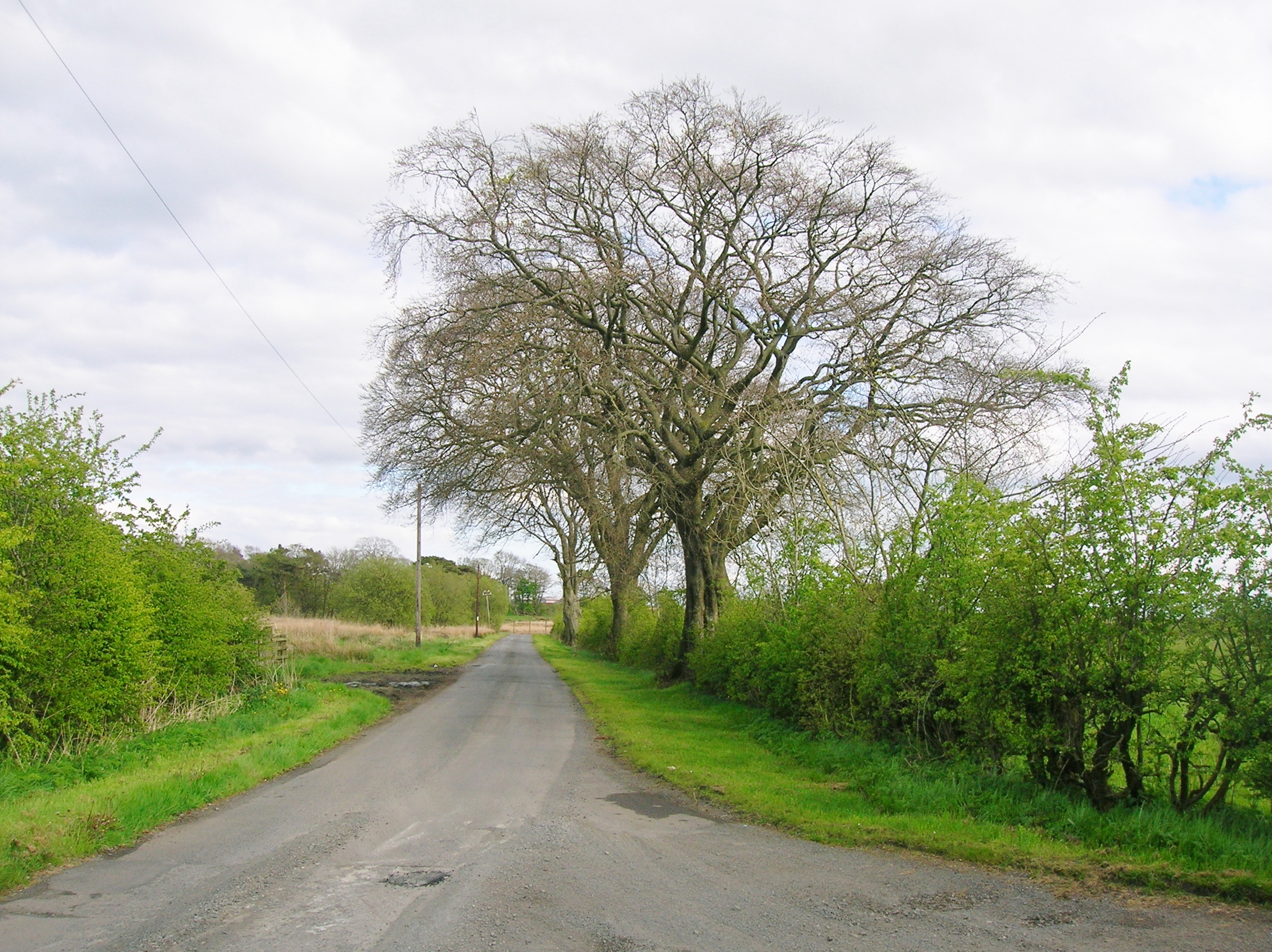
Looking towards DM Beith and the Barkip Road

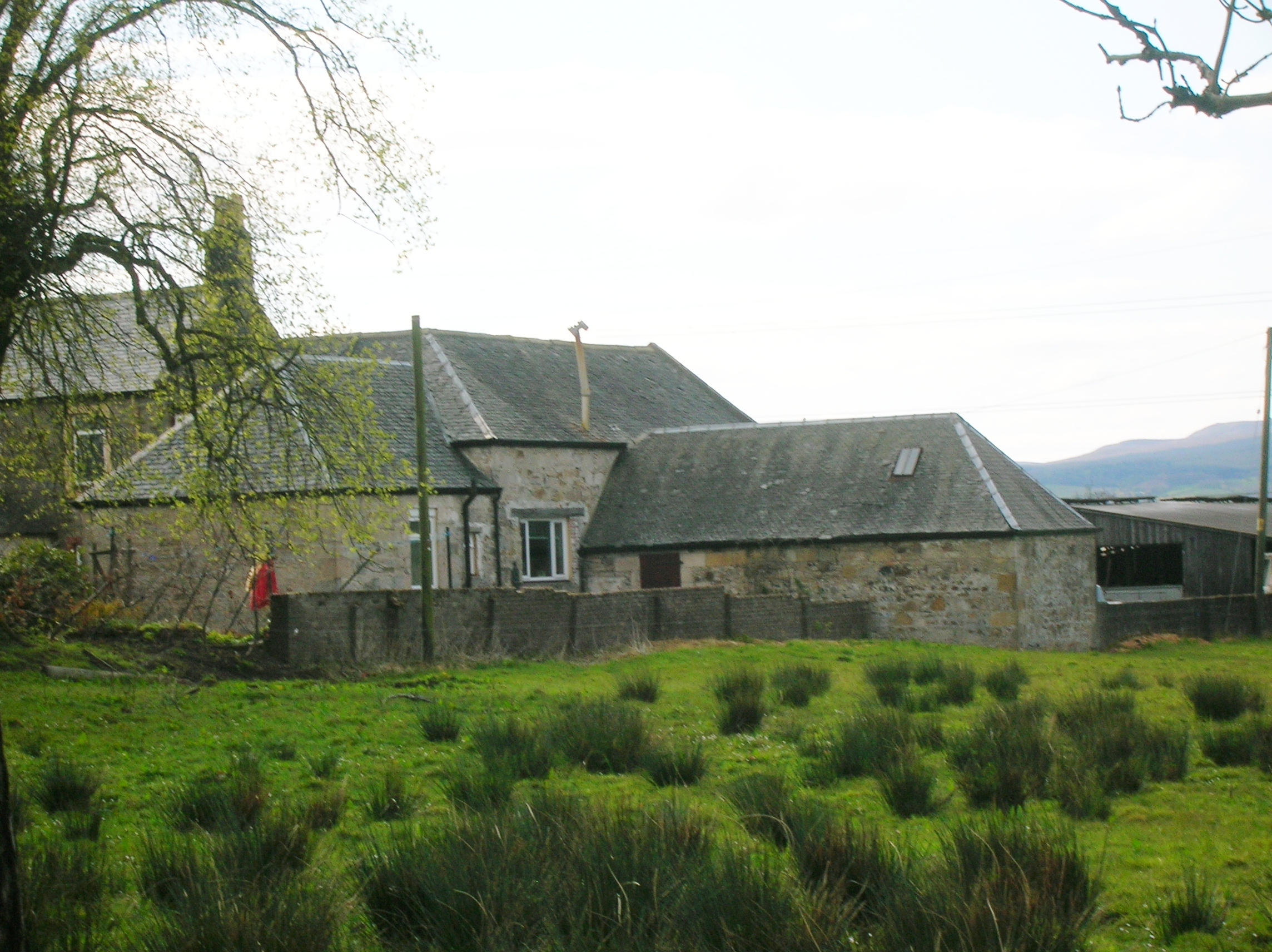
The older section of the Roughwood Farm buildings

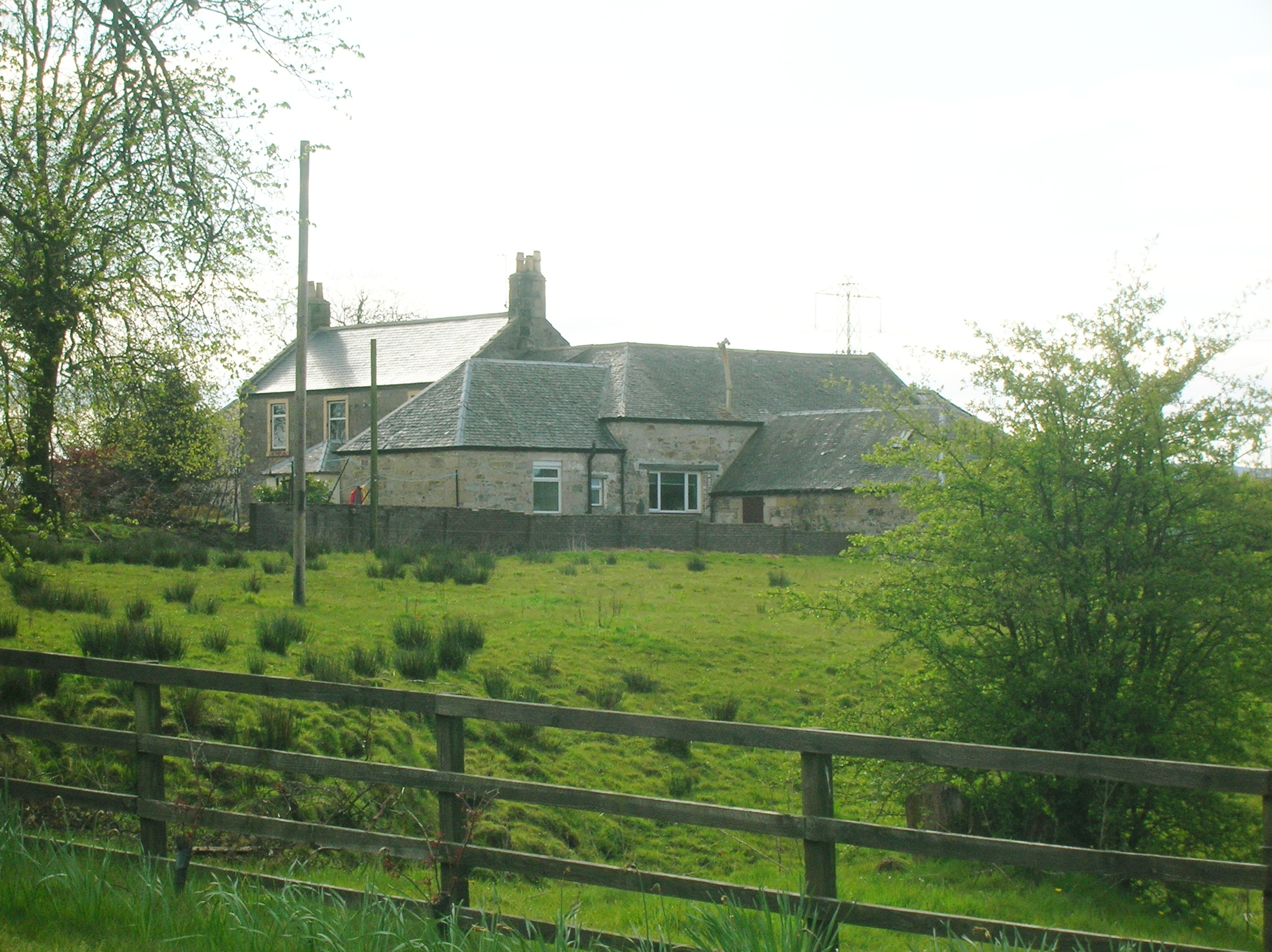
Roughwood Farm buildings

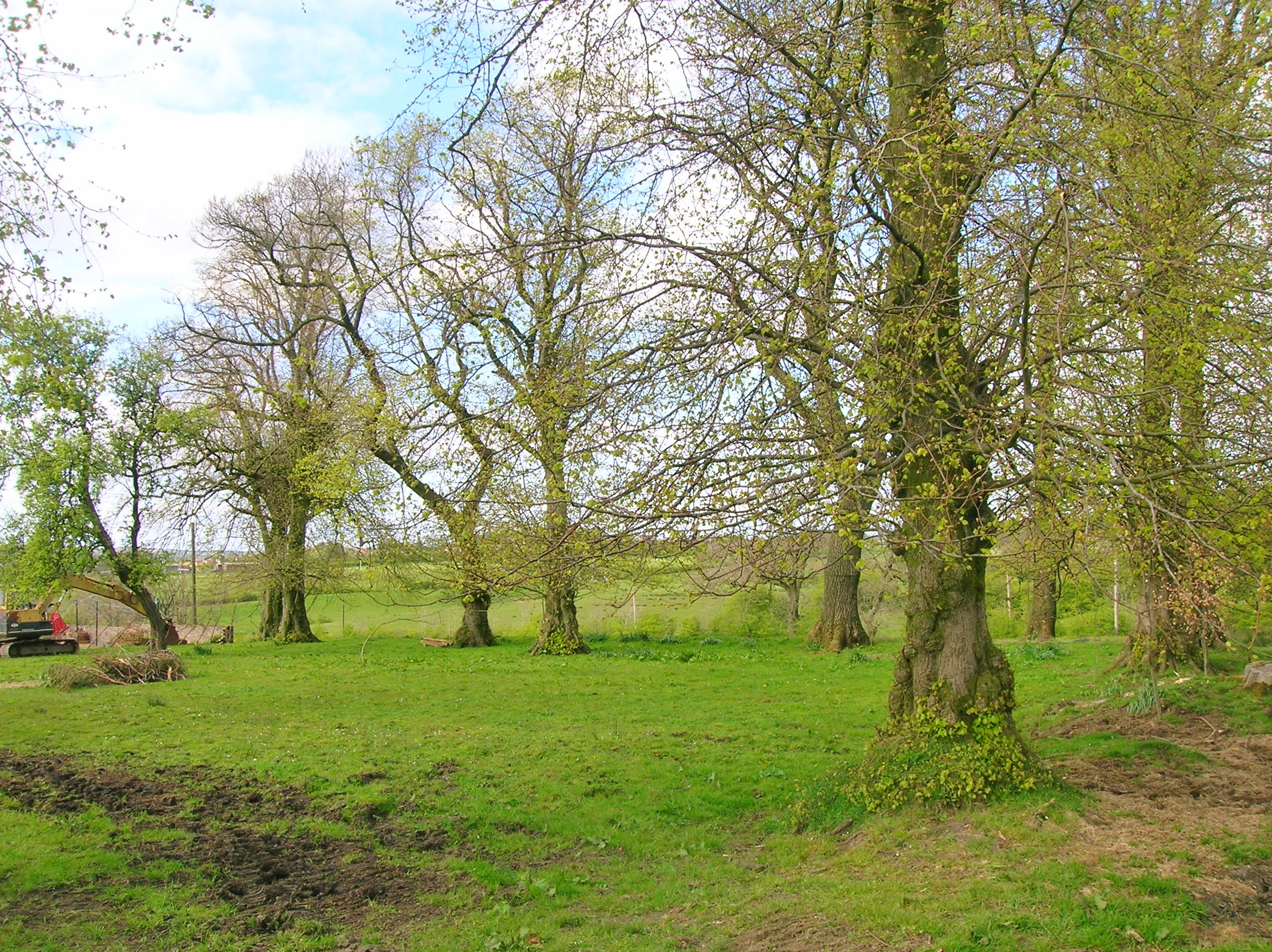
Site of the old orchard and plantations

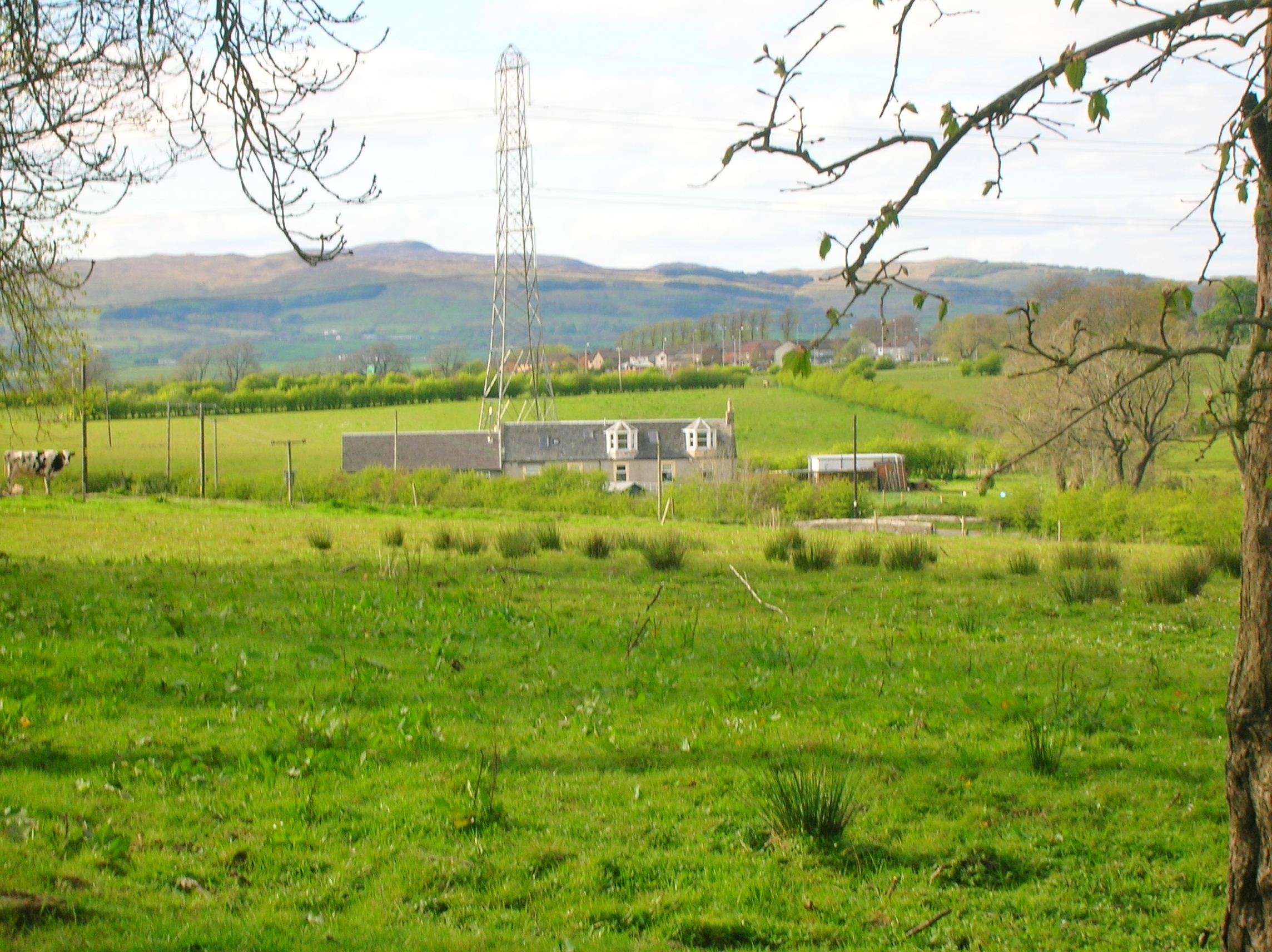
Burnside cottage from Roughwood

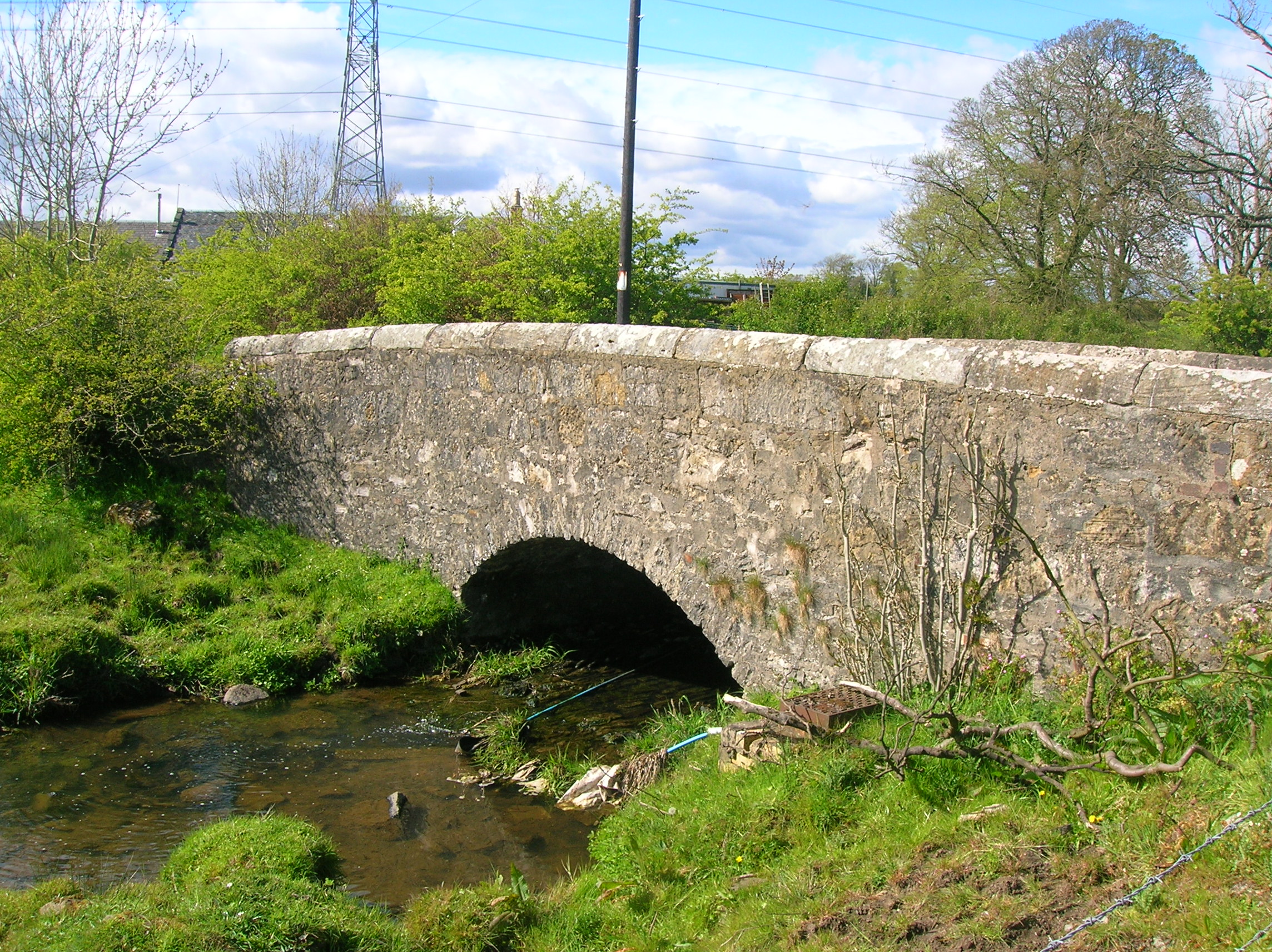
Roughwood Bridge

=== The Sheddens ===
Robert Shedden (b 1643), a merchant in Beith, had two sons, Robert of Millburn and then later Roughwood, and John of Marshalland. Robert the heir, married Jean Harvey of Greenend, daughter of Robert Harvey. Robert acquired the lands of Roughwood from the Hamills in 1713 and had a son, John. In 1734 John Shedden also held house and tenements in Beith, portions of the old Glebe and the lands of Easterbraehead, Townhead, Knockbuckle, Cumingsbraehead and Braehouses.

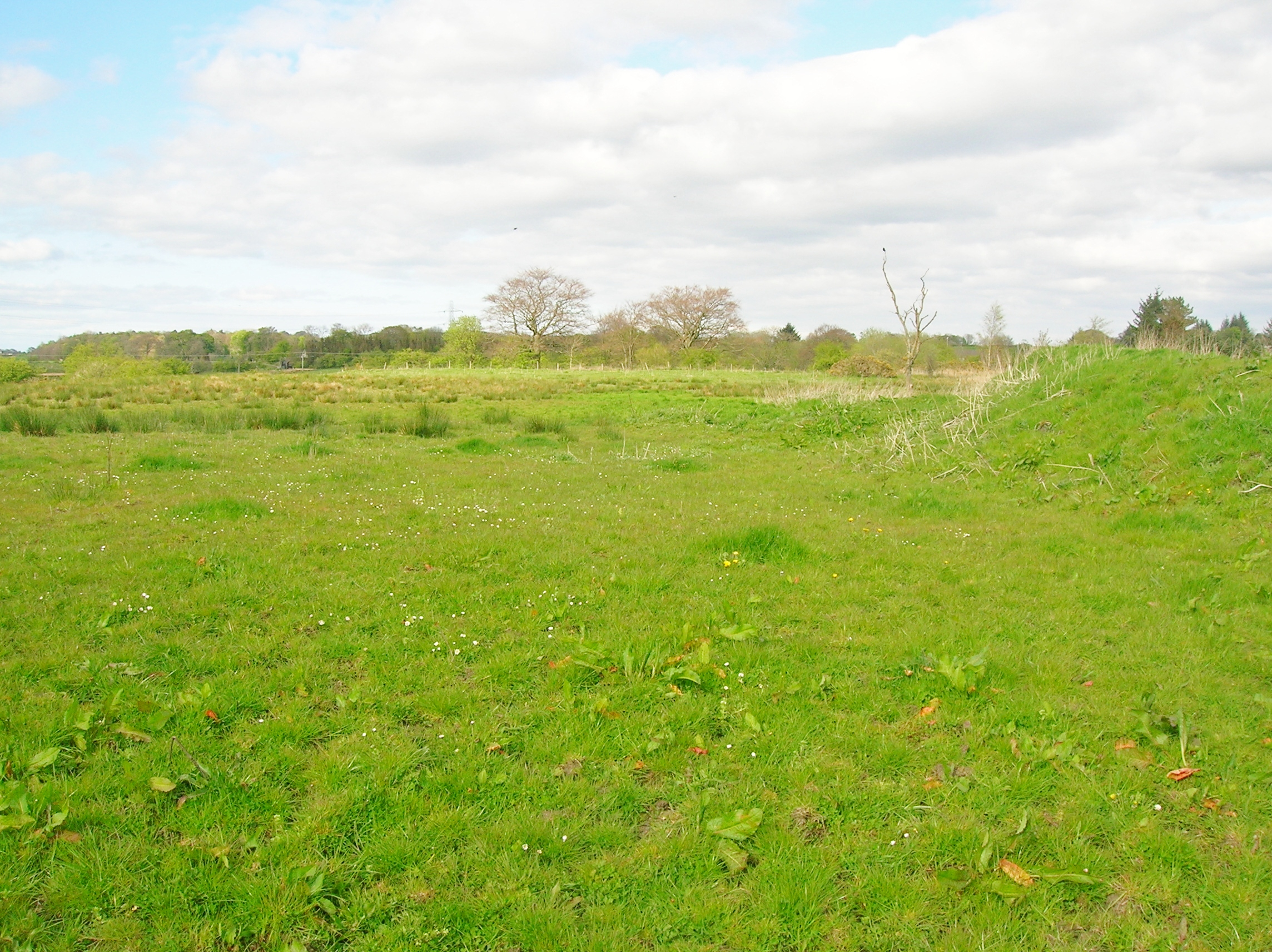
Site of the old limestone quarry and lime kilns

John Shedden (b 1690) succeeded his father in the lands of Roughwood and Millburn and married Jean Ralstoun, eldest daughter of Gavin Ralstoun of that Ilk. William Ralstoun Shedden was born on 23 April 1747 and succeeded to Roughwood and Millburn on 1 May 1770. He lost property in Virginia as a result of American independence, moved to Bermuda and finally settled in New York, never to return to Roughwood. Upon his death a judicial sale of the estate was only avoided by Robert Patrick, eldest son of John Patrick and Marion Shedden (B 1733), paying the value of his late uncle's estate. Later he sold Roughwood and Millburn to his younger brother, William Patrick, upon purchasing Hessilhead. William therefore acquired his mother's family estate and also purchased the Woodside-Ralston estate of his grandmother.

The Shedden arms were "Azure, on a chevron, betwixt three Griffins' Heads, erazed, Argent; as many Cross Cross-lets fitchee, Gules; on a chiefl of the second, an Escalop Shell of the first, inter two Cinquefoils of the third." When translated the Arms description is: Blue: on a silver chevron between three griffins' heads jagged, three red crosses crosslet pointed at the foot; on a silver upper third a blue shell between two red cinquefoils. The Shedden crest was a Lion Rampant and the motto "Virtute et Fidelitate." (By Valour and Fidelty).

Litigation

Because Robert Patrick had been served heir to his uncle's estate of Roughwood in 1799, the junior branch, which descended from William Shedden (b 1708), youngest son of John Shedden (b 1643), never actually held Roughwood. William Ralston Shedden (b 1828), was the only son of William Patrick Shedden (b 1794), and unfortunately became obsessed with the idea that he was the rightful heir to the Roughwood estates. He entered on a course of litigation in the prosecuting of which he used up the whole of his fortune that he inherited from his father. The claim continued to be pressed by the family for many years and when all their funds had been exhausted his sister, Annabella Jane Shedden, took up the pleadings and in a futile final effort conducted the case before a committee of the House of Lords.

=== The Patricks and Ralston-Patricks ===
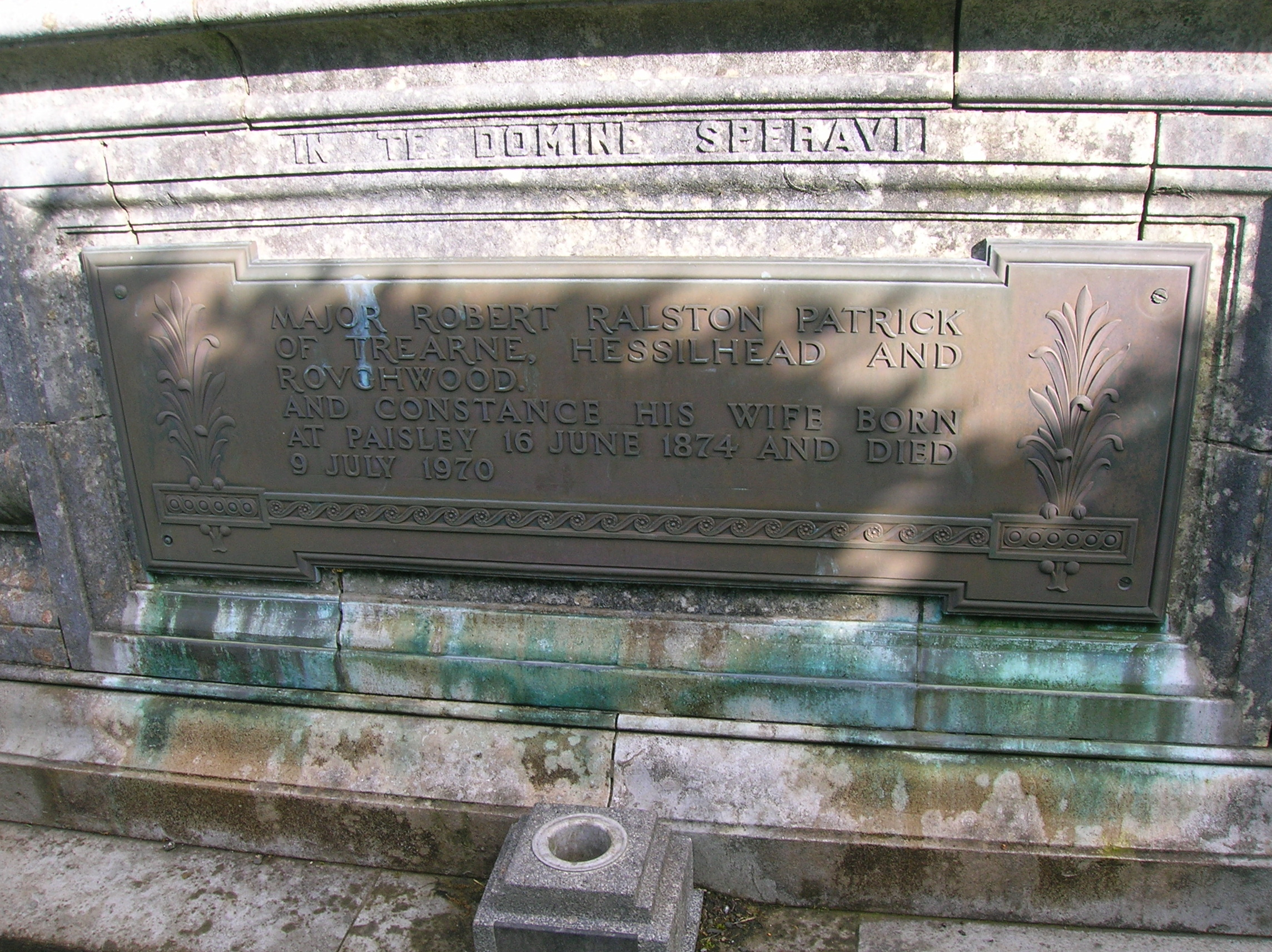
Memorial plaque to Major Robert Ralston-Patrick at Beith cemetery

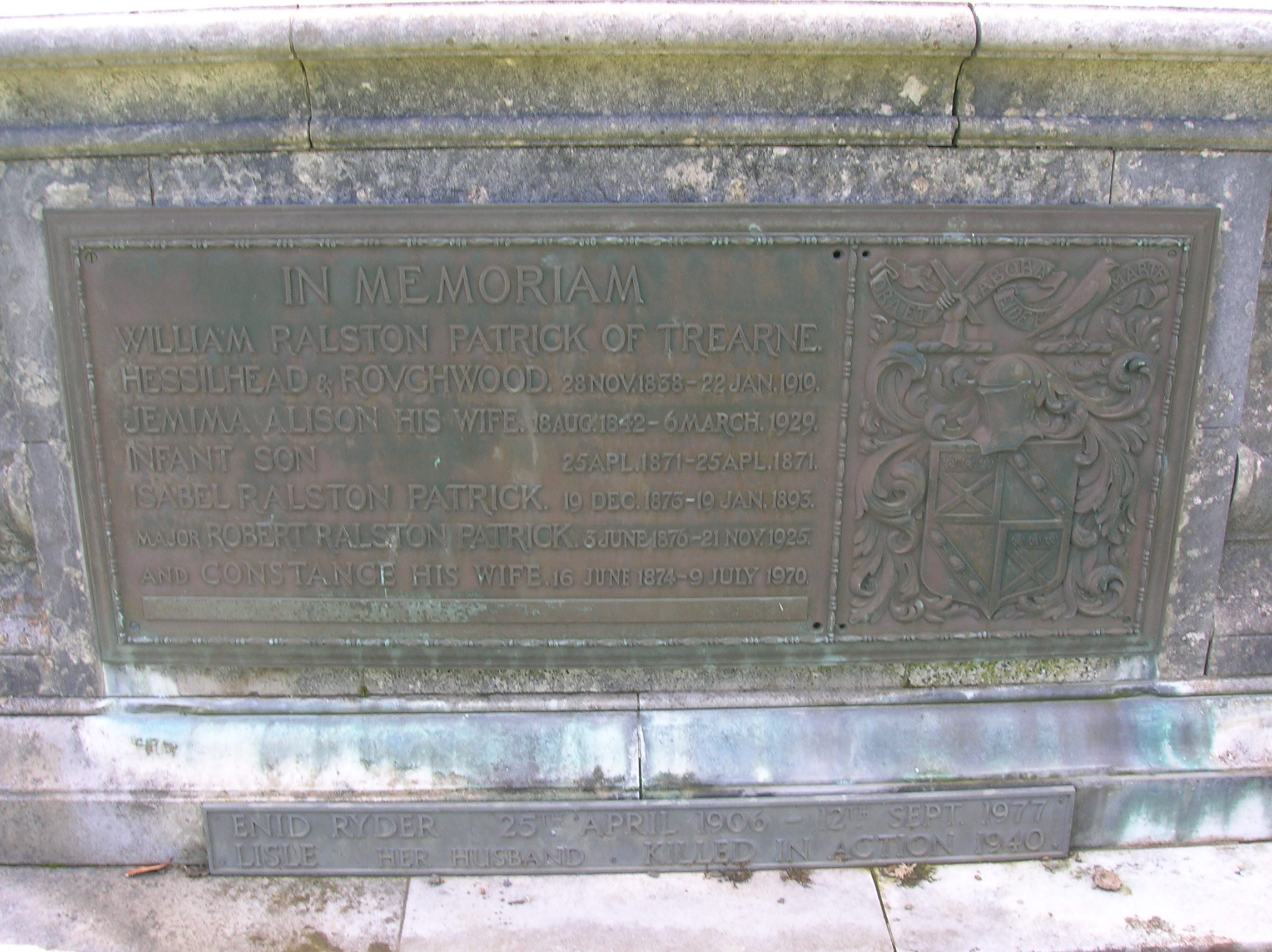
Memorial to the Ralston-Patricks of Trearne, Hessilhead and Roughwood

In 1823 William Patrick held the lands of Roughwood. Dobie records that Neubottle (the ancient name of the lands called 'Windyhouse), Over Windyhouse and Nether Windyhouse were purchased by William Patrick of Roughwood in 1810 and 1841. As stated above, in the 1870s these properties remained as part of the Roughwood estates, owned by William Ralston-Patrick of Trearne and Hessilhead.

The portrait of William Patrick once hung in the Beith Town House. He was responsible for many local improvements and was often asked for advice on parochial matters.

The memorial to the Ralston Patricks of Trearne, Hessilhead and Rovghwood (sic) is located in Beith cemetery. This memorial records the following details: William Ralston-Patrick of Trearne, Hessilhead and Roughwood 28 November 1838 to 22 January 1919. Jemima Alison, his wife, 18 August 1842 to 6 March 1929. Isabel Ralston-Patrick, 19 December 1873 to 19 January 1893. Major Robert Ralston-Patrick, 3 June 1876 - 21 November 1925 and Constance, his wife, 16 June 1874 to 9 June 1970. Enid Helen Constance Ryder, 25 April 1906 to 12 September 1977. Her husband Major Lisle Ryder, was killed with all but two of his troops after surrendering at Le Paradis on 27th May, 1940.

The Ralston crest is "Argent, on a bend, azure: three acorns in the seed, or. A falcon proper". The family motto is "Fide et Marte" (Faithful and Warlike). The Patrick family motto is "Ora et Labora" (pray and labor) and the crest a clenched hand holding a Saint Andrew's cross.

== Quarrying and lime kilns ==
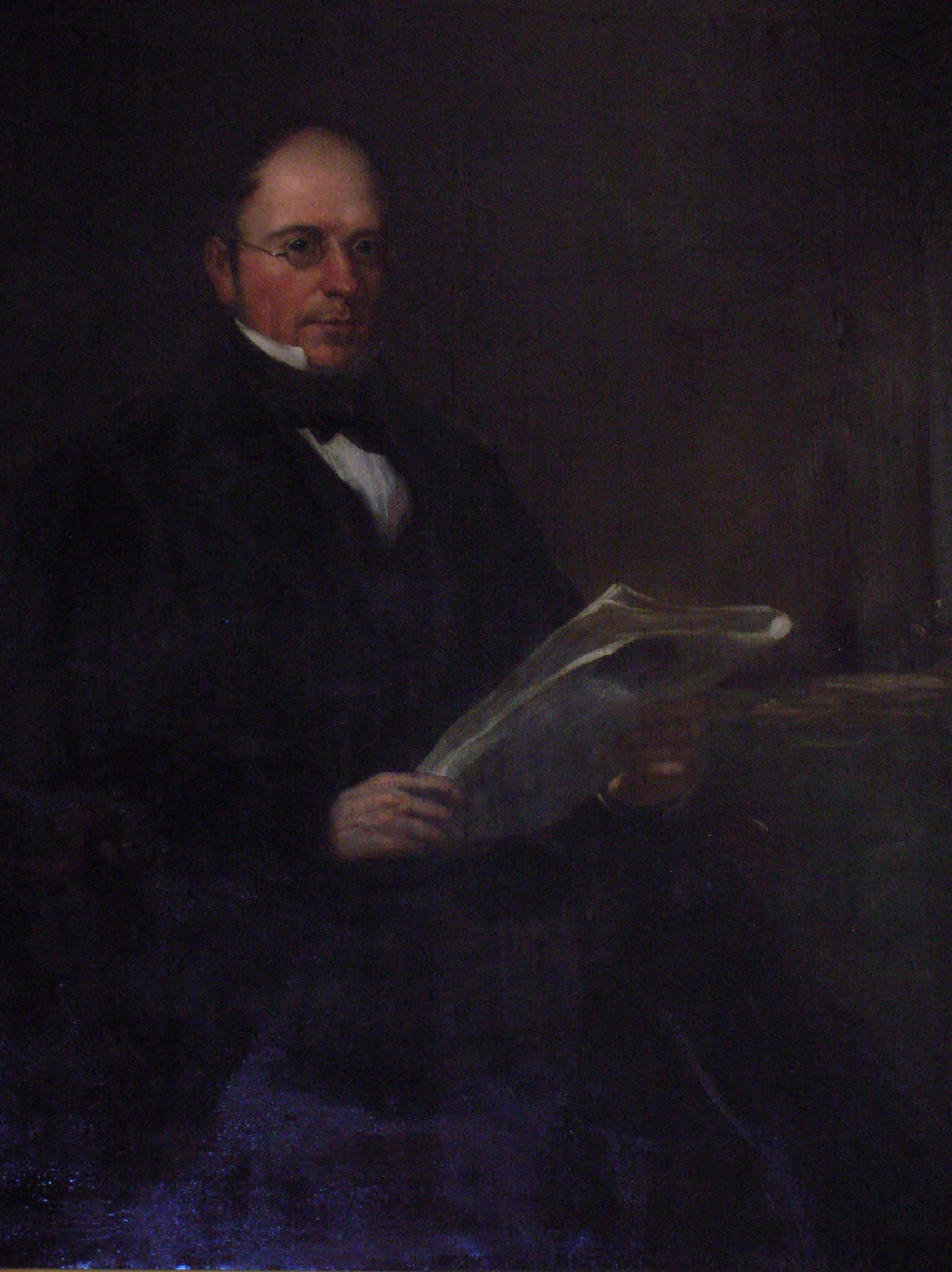
William Ralston Patrick

The underlying geology of this part of Ayrshire is such that the presence of the many limestone quarries is to be expected. Lime kilns to produce lime for improving the soil, were a common feature of the countryside before the process became fully industrialised. Roughwood had at least two limekilns nearby and a large limestone quarry is shown on OS maps in the area of the old 'Myre' dwelling of which nothing survives other than the surrounding shape of its hedgerows. The quarry has been infilled and the limekilns demolished. These kilns would have created considerable pollution in the area, surprisingly close to Roughwood Farm.

== Burnside ==
This property is located near Roughwood Bridge on the other side of the Powgree Burn. William Patrick Parker and Elizabeth Stevenson Hamilton had a child, John Parker, who was born at Burnside on 6 July 1898, Burnside; he died on 19 July 1955.

Burnside sits close to the Powgree and the garden area is suggestive of a silted up mill pond or such-like. No evidence of a mill is extant.

== Micro-history ==
William Patrick of Roughwood in 1855 is said to have employed the builder and mason Robert Snodgrass to construct the 'Barnweil Monument' near Ayr to the memory of William Wallace.

Dr. Hammil, the private physician to the Emperor of Russia, is said to have descended from the Roughwood branch of the Hammil family.

A James Hammill is recorded as living at Swinrickmuir (Swindridgemuir) in the parish of Dalry in 1666.

A Hamilfield House with a walled garden stands on Bigholm Road in Beith. A Hamilfield Church stood next door until destroyed by fire in 1917 and later rebuilt as the now redundant Trinity Church.

The Parker family are recorded as living at Roughwood; a Jeannie Gilmour Parker was born at Roughwood, as were her siblings, Mary, Anne and Hugh. Their father, Hugh Parker, was at Roughwood in 1795, and the family lived there for exactly 100 years, until moving to Kirkcudbrightshire, where they still farm. Their grandfather, also Hugh Parker, owned a tile making business in East Kilbride.

It is recorded in a Kirkcudbrightshire local paper that on 19 May 1886 the marriage took place in Beith of Hugh Parker of Roughwood and Anne Ritchie of Mains of Beith.

Pont's survey of the early 1600s records a 'Bar-Kyipe' lying in the barony of Kersland and Dobie records that Barkip formed part of the estate of Roughwood in 1874, belonging to William Ralston-Patrick.
