= Owl hole =

Entrance to barns for owls

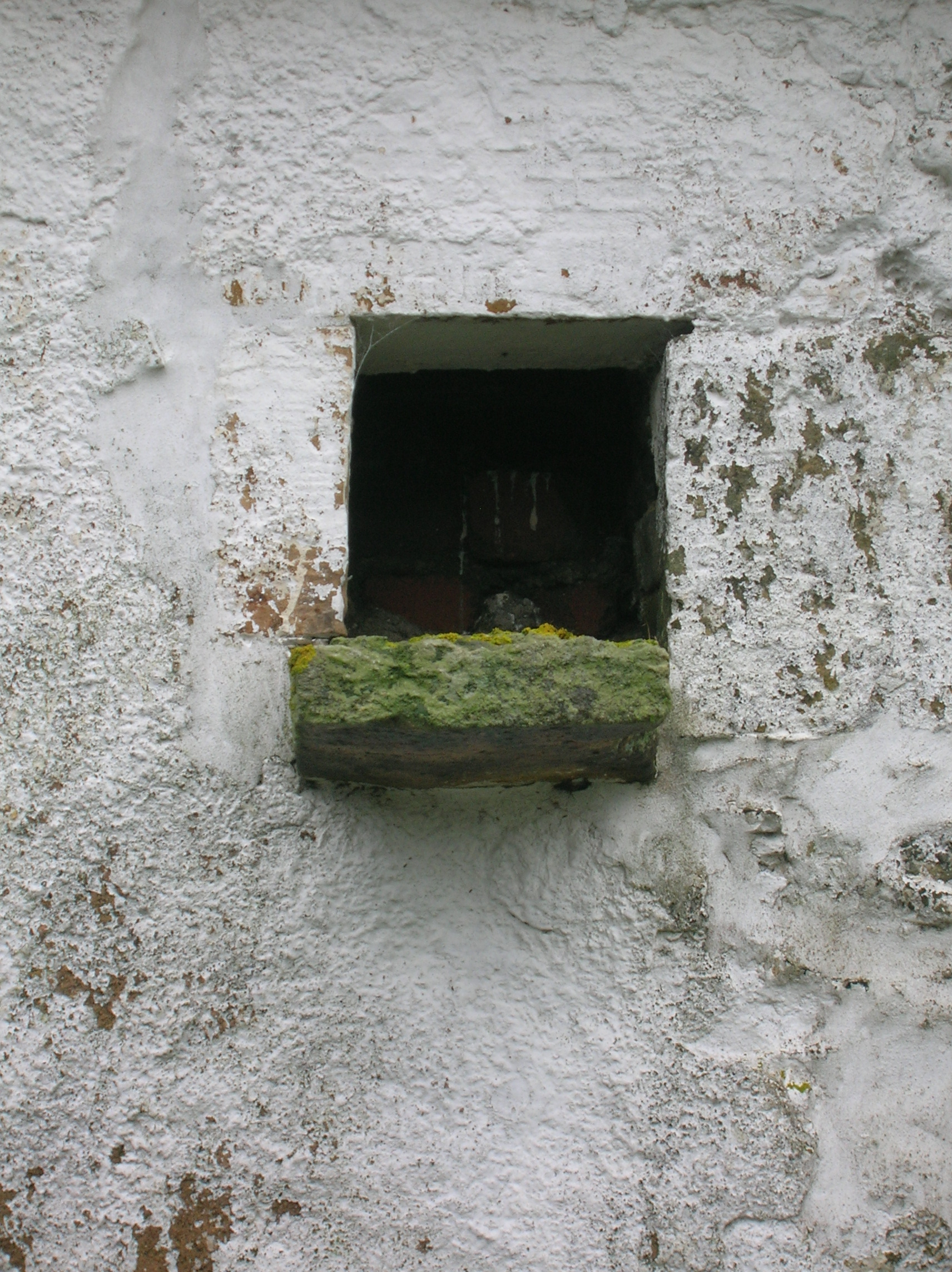
An owl hole at Lugton Ridge Farm, Auchentiber.

An owl hole is a structural entrance built into buildings (such as mills and barns) to allow predatory birds, typically barn owls (Tyto alba), to enter. The birds prey on farm vermin, and therefore benefit the human owner of the structure in a symbiotic relationship.

== History ==
The barn owl feeds primarily on small vertebrates, particularly rodents. Studies have shown that a barn owl may eat one or more rodents per night; a nesting pair and their young can eat more than 1,000 rodents per year and have been referred to as 'nature's mousetraps'. Locally superabundant rodent species in the weight class of several grams per individual usually make up the single largest proportion of prey. Barn Owls consume more rodents than possibly any other creature. This makes the barn owl one of the most economically valuable wildlife animals to farmers and millers. Farmers and others found these owls effective in keeping down rodent pests, and they encouraged barn owl habitation by providing nest sites. In the few months between hatching and fledging, a clutch of six owlets can consume up to 70 pounds (32 kg) of rodents.

With the advent of modern pesticides the perceived value of biological control has dramatically decreased to the point that few owl holes are still in active use. Many of the holes have been blocked up and landing platforms broken off.

== Design ==
First used at the end of the 17th century, these were often positioned on the gables end of buildings. Owl holes were usually placed under the eaves. The perch or landing platform was made from stone or wood and usually sloped slightly downward to prevent rain water from entering the building. The entry holes are usually oblong and six to nine inches (152–228 mm) that permits a single bird to enter with space for a safe landing and passage to the interior whilst at the same time excluding larger predators. Owl holes without landing platforms had grooves or rough surfaces beneath the hole to aid grip. On wooden buildings circular examples are sometimes found. The openings usually faced onto open ground so that they could be easily seen by barn owls seeking nesting sites. Owl holes also assisted ventilation within barns and provided for some extra illumination.

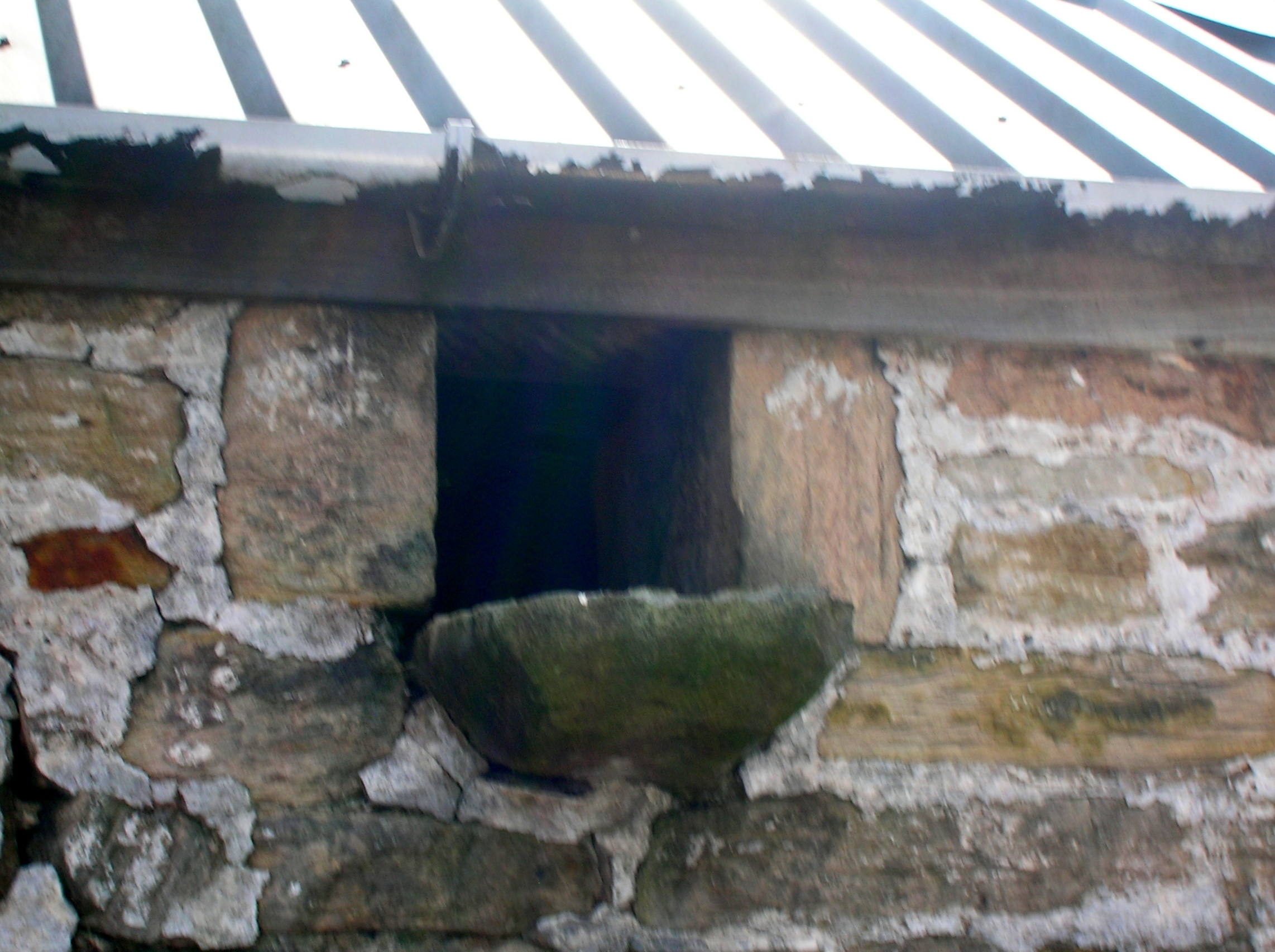
Owl hole at Roughwood Farm, Scotland.

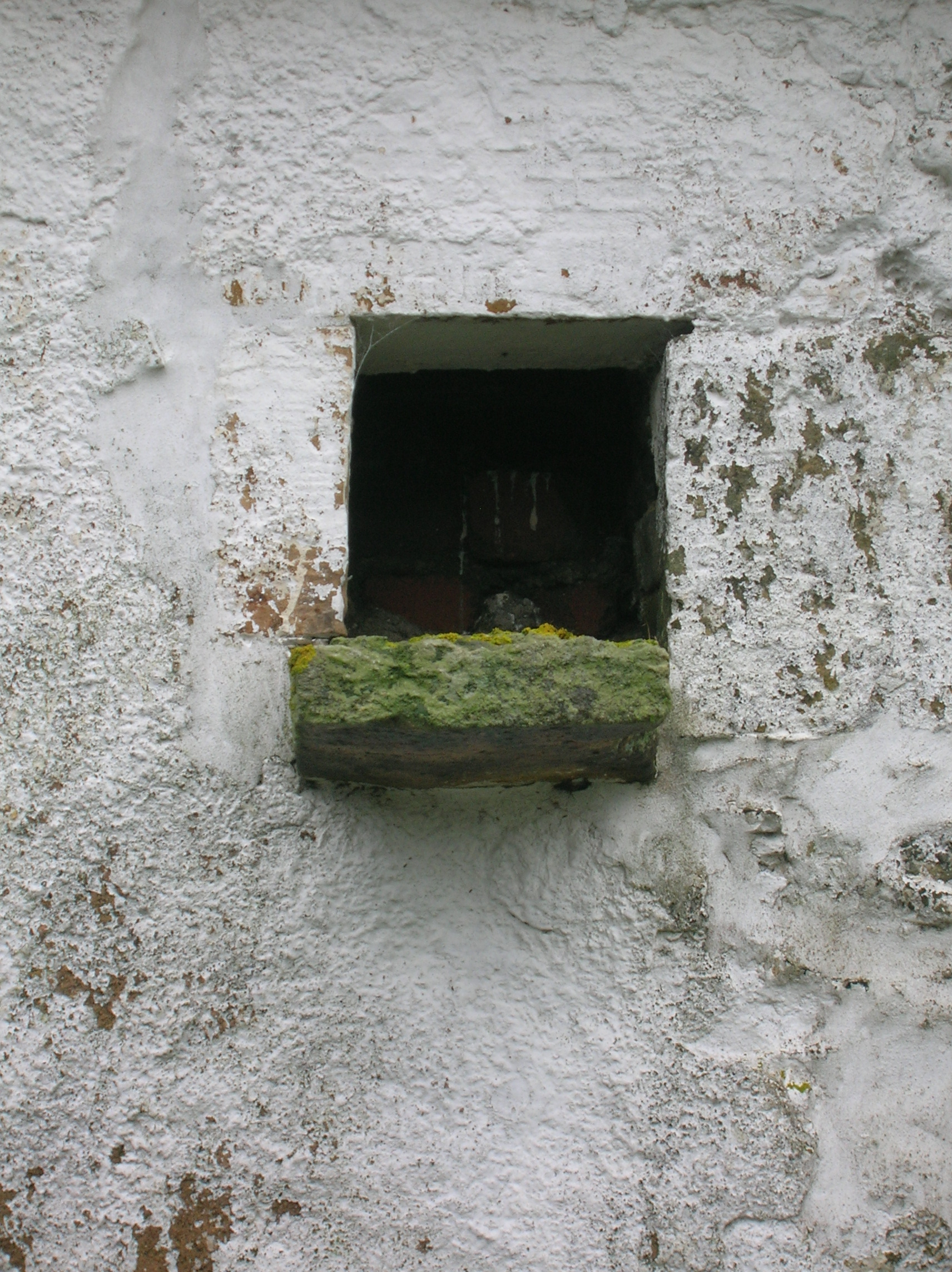
Owl hole at Lugton Ridge Farm, Scotland.

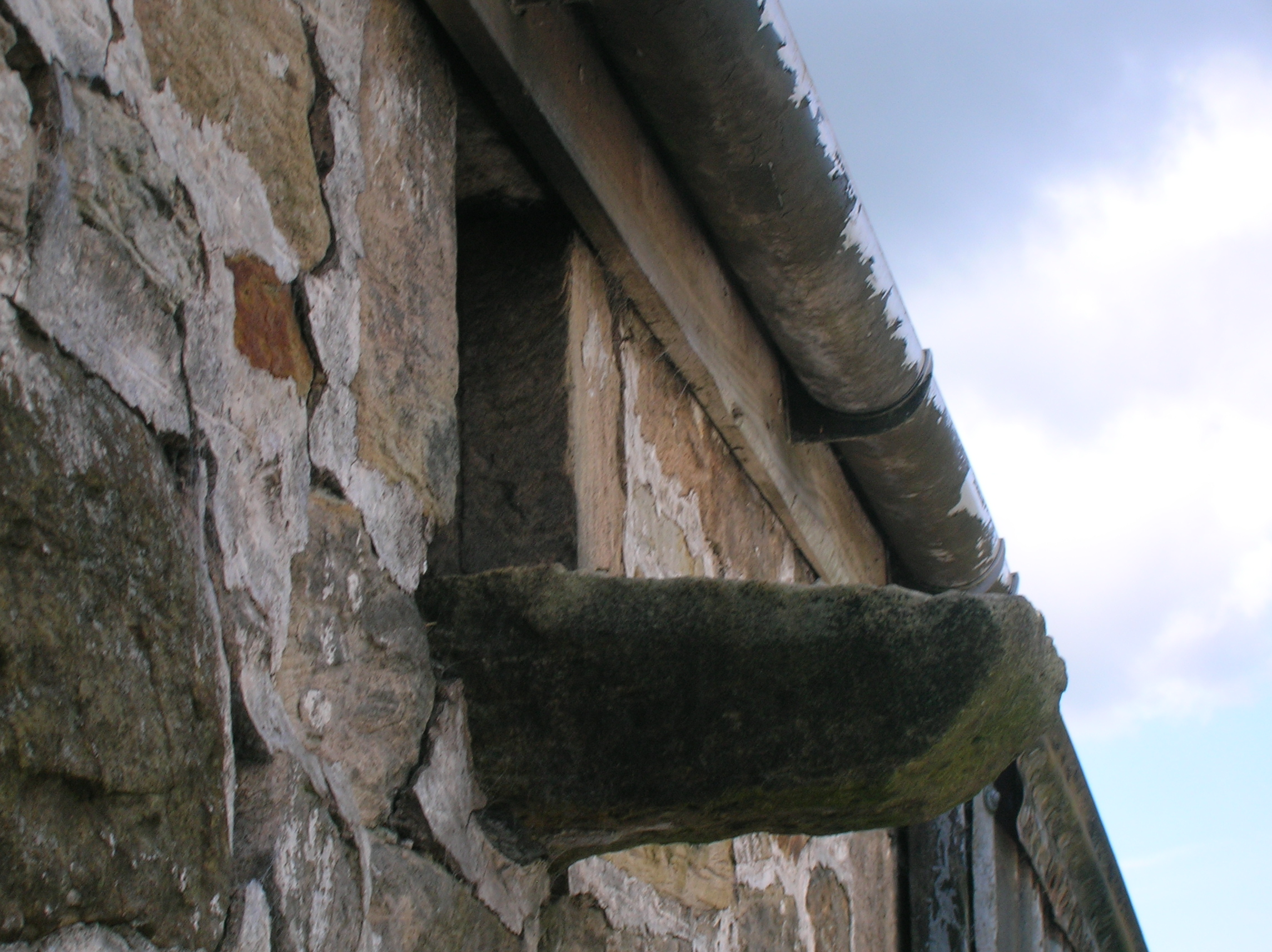
Perch or landing platform

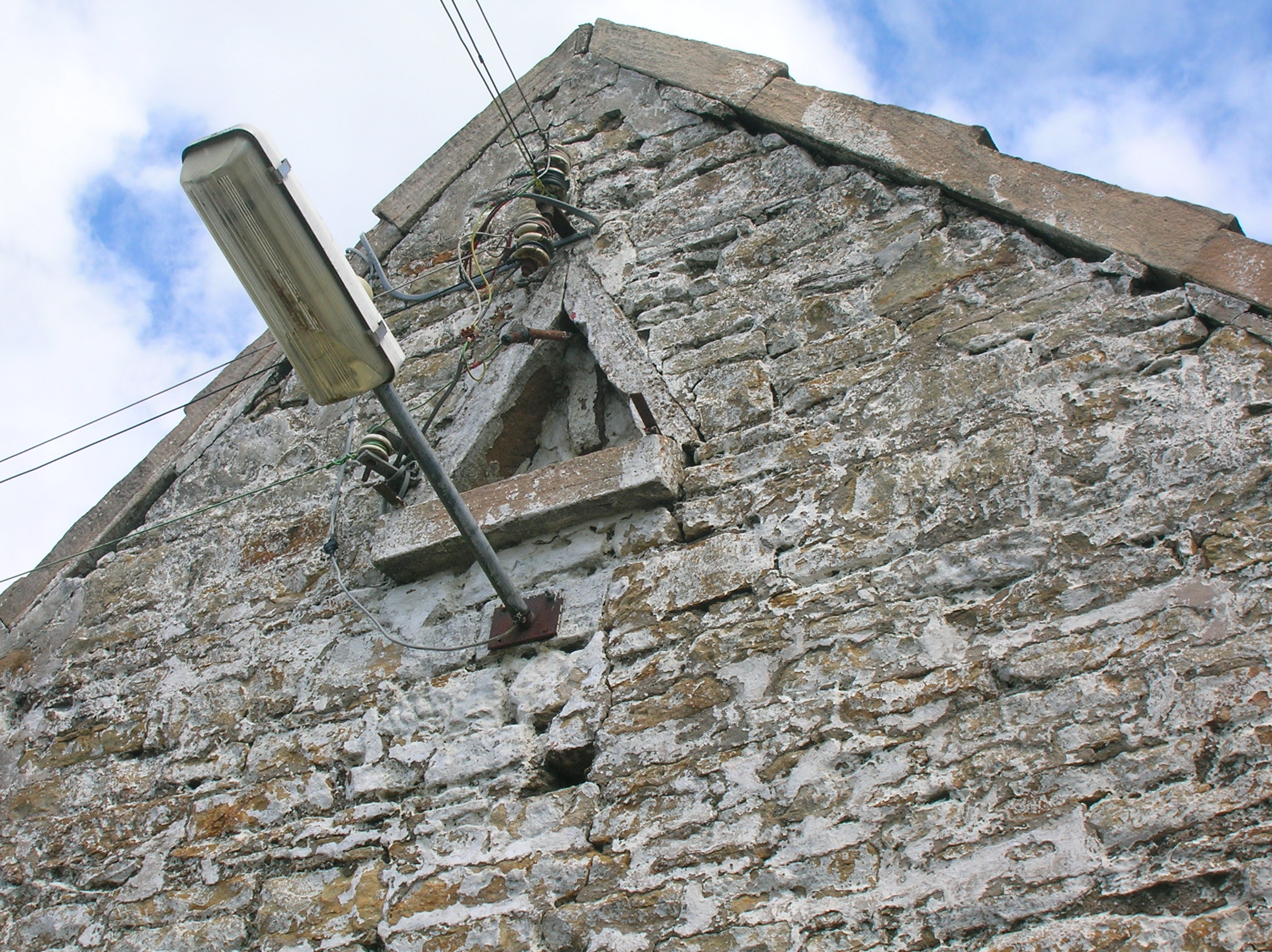
Triangular owl hole at Roughwood Farm, Scotland.

Some examples found on the gable ends of wooden barns are very ornate and may be the 'signatures' of the craftsmen who built the barns, coupling this with a practical function of ventilation and as owl holes. Owl holes are sometimes found in association with dovecots as pigeons are not generally a prey species for barn owls.

== Distribution ==
In Scotland owl holes were a common feature of old farms and mills, such as Roughwood Farm and Dalgarven Mill.

Owl holes were found in Wales, a 'triangular' example survives at Llangattock in Glamorgan.

In England an example is to be found on an old pumping mill in Norfolk, old barns in Yorkshire, etc.

In Germany these structures are known as Eulenloch ('owl hole').

Examples are recorded from Ontario in Canada and the US.

== Micro-history ==
In Hallstatt at the foot of the Echernwand, a trapeze-shaped opening is visible in the rock face. The hole in the cliff has been known as the Eulenloch ('owl hole').

== See also ==
- Bird nest – Place where a bird lays its eggs

== External sources ==
- Barn Owl Trust
