= 2½ cents (World War II Dutch coin) =

Coin minted in the Netherlands during World War II

2 1/2 cents
- Netherlands
- Value: 2 1/2 Dutch cents
- Mass: 2 g
- Diameter: 20 mm
- Edge: Plain
- Composition: 100% Zn
- Years of minting: 1941–1942

Obverse
- Design: Two swans' heads. Lettering: NEDERLAND

Reverse
- Design: Denomination, four waves, and grain. Lettering; 2 1/2ct 1941

The 2 1/2-cent coin minted in the Netherlands during World War II was made of zinc, and worth 1/40, or .025, of the Dutch guilder. It was designed by Nico de Haas, a Dutch national-socialist, and struck in 1941 and 1942.

== Mintage ==
| Year | Mintage | Notes |
|---|---|---|
| 1941 | 27,600,000 | |
| 1942 | | |
