= Dutch 10-cent coins =

Dutch 10-cent coins may refer to:

- Ten cent coin (Netherlands 1926–1941)
- Ten cent coin (Netherlands 1941–1943)
- Dubbeltje, all pre-Euro Dutch 10-cent coins
