= List of 2 euro commemorative coins (2020–2029) =

Commemorative coins of the Eurozone 2020-2029

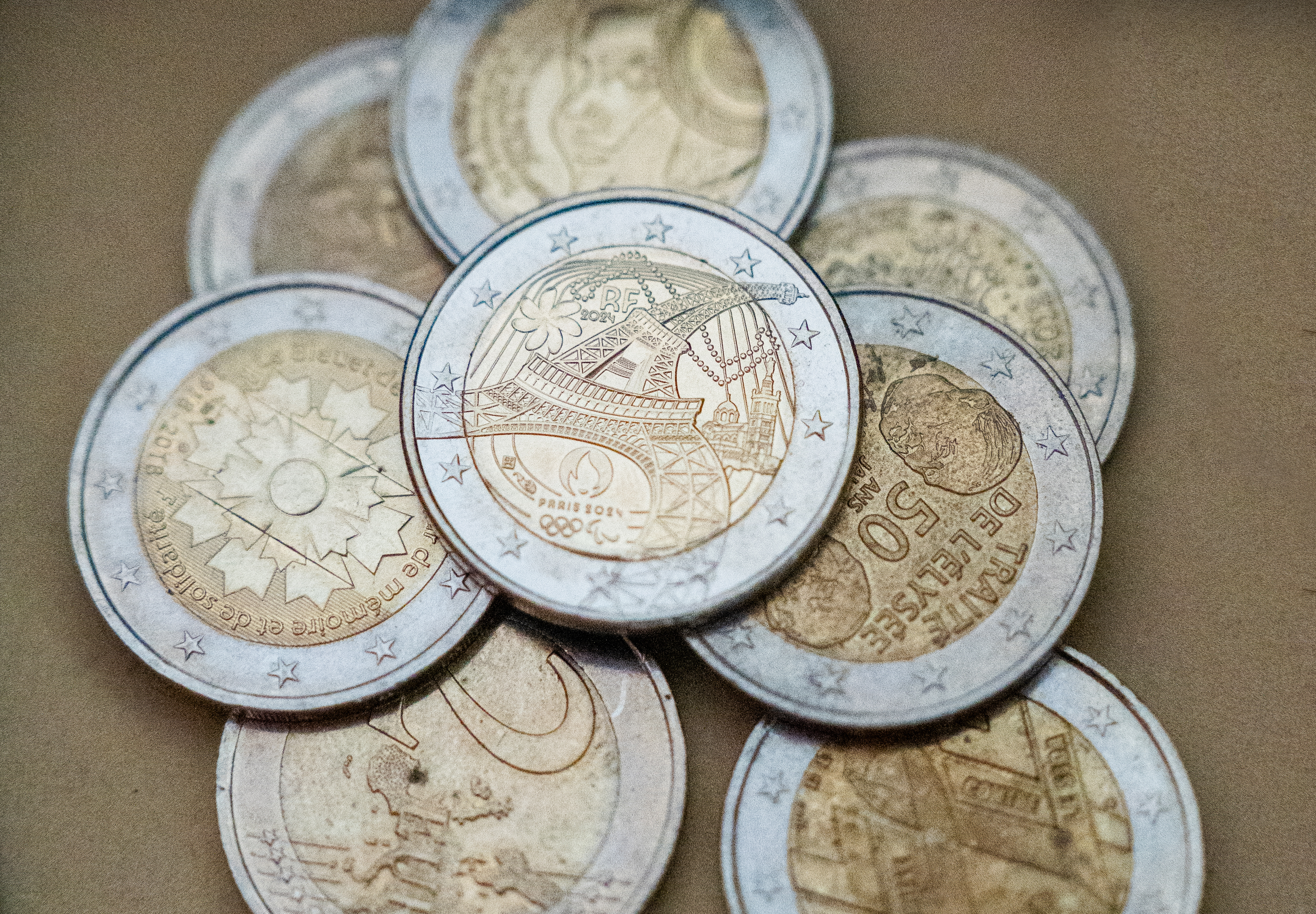
2 euro commemorative coins

€2 commemorative coins are special euro coins that have been minted and issued by member states of the eurozone since 2004 as legal tender in all eurozone member states.

€2 coins are the only denomination intended for circulation that may be issued as commemorative coins. Only the national obverse sides of the commemorative coins differ; the common reverse sides do not. The coins typically commemorate the anniversaries of historical events or current events of special importance.

Since 2012, the number of commemorative coins has been limited to two per country per year; previously only one was allowed. Issues of common commemoratives do not count towards the limit. The total number of commemorative coins placed in circulation per year is also limited. The commemorative coins must follow the design standards stipulated for regular €2 coins, with design limitations to guarantee uniformity.

Up to the end of 2025, 584 variations of €2 commemorative coins have been issued (including three scheduled coins from Vatican City). Finland, Italy, Luxembourg, San Marino and the Vatican City are the only countries to have released at least one commemorative coin every year since 2004.

Though they have become collectibles, €2 commemoratives are different from non-standard denomination commemorative euro coins, which are officially designated as "collector coins", not intended for circulation and usually made of precious metals.

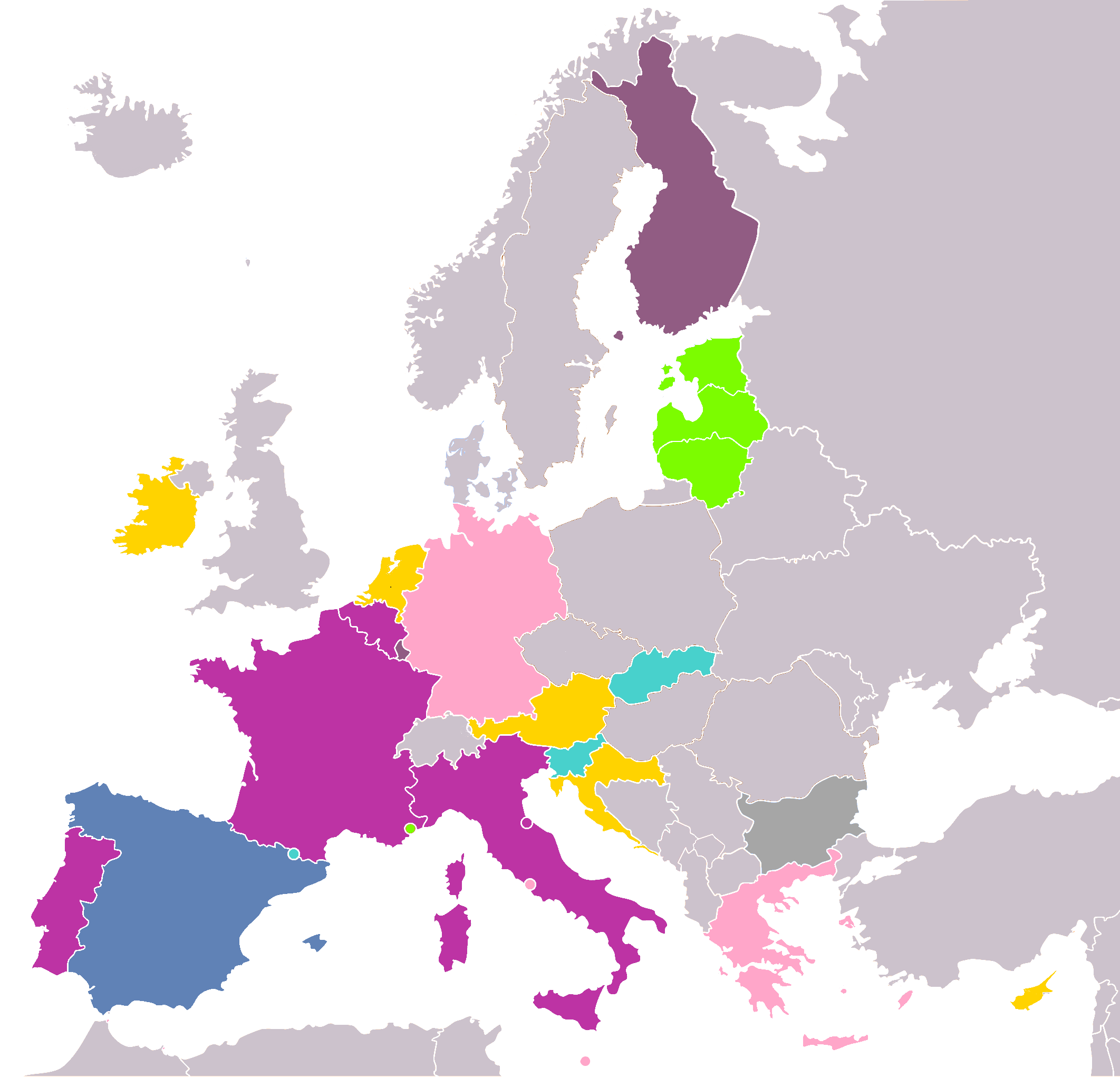
Color-coded map* of eurozone countries by number of €2 commemorative coins issued *State 1 October 2026 46 to 50 coins issued 41 to 45 coins issued 36 to 40 coins issued 31 to 35 coins issued 26 to 30 coins issued 21 to 25 coins issued 16 to 20 coins issued 11 to 15 coins issued 6 to 10 coins issued 1 to 5 coins issued no coins issued not part of the eurozone

== Issues ==
Common €2 commemorative coins issued 2020-2029 by all eurozone member states:

- European Union: 35 years of the Erasmus Programme in 2022.

Coins series with a specific theme (2020-2029):

- Croatia: Croatian Cities (2024–future) – coins representing Croatian cities.
- Estonia: Estonian National Symbols (2021–future) – coins representing national symbols of Estonia.
- France: 2024 Summer Olympics (2021–2024) – one coin per year representing sports at the 2024 Summer Olympics.
- Germany:
  - Bundesländer II (2023–2038) – one coin per year for each of the 16 States of the Federal Republic of Germany.
  - Unity, Justice and Freedom (2025–present) – one coin per year representing politicians who have made a significant contribution to the history of the Federal Republic of Germany.
- Lithuania: Lithuanian Cities (2026–future) – coins representing Lithuanian cities.
- Malta:
  - Maltese Walled Cities (2024–future) – one coin per year representing Maltese walled cities.
  - Maltese Native Species (2024–future) – one coin per year representing Maltese native species.

Country	Issues	2020	2021	2022		2023	2024	2025	2026	2027
Country	Issues	2020	2021	reg.	ErPr	2023	2024	2025	2026	2027
Andorra	23	Y/Y	Y/Y	Y/Y		Y/Y	Y/Y	Y/Y	S/S	
Austria	8				Y					S
Belgium	37	Y/Y	Y/Y	Y	Y	Y/Y	Y/Y	Y/Y	Y/Y	
Bulgaria	0								S	
Croatia	6					Y	Y/Y	Y/Y	Y/S	
Cyprus	9	Y			Y	Y	Y		Y	
Estonia	19	Y/Y	Y/Y	Y/Y	Y	Y	Y	Y	Y	S/S
Finland	41	Y/Y	Y/Y	Y/Y	Y	Y/Y	Y/Y	Y/Y	Y/Y	
France	37	Y/Y	Y/Y	Y/Y	Y	Y/Y	Y/Y	Y/Y	Y/Y	
Germany	35	Y/Y	Y	Y	Y	Y/Y	Y/Y	Y/Y	Y/Y	S/S
Greece	33	Y/Y	Y	Y	Y	Y/Y	Y/Y	Y/Y	Y/Y	
Ireland	10				Y	Y			Y/Y	
Italy	40	Y/Y	Y/Y	Y/Y	Y	Y/Y	Y/Y	Y/Y	Y/Y	
Latvia	18	Y	Y	Y	Y	Y	Y	Y	S	
Lithuania	21	Y/Y	Y/Y	Y/Y	Y	Y	Y	Y/Y	Y/Y	S/S
Luxembourg	41	Y/Y	Y/Y	Y/Y	Y	Y/Y	Y/Y	Y/Y	Y/Y	
Malta	33	Y/Y	Y/Y	Y/Y	Y	Y/Y	Y/Y	Y/Y	Y/Y	
Monaco	17	Y	Y	Y		Y	Y	Y/Y	Y	
Netherlands	9				Y					
Portugal	37	Y/Y	Y/Y	Y	Y	Y/Y	Y/Y	Y/Y	Y/Y	
San Marino	36	Y/Y	Y/Y	Y/Y		Y/Y	Y/Y	Y/Y	Y/Y	
Slovakia	22	Y	Y	Y	Y	Y/Y	Y	Y	Y/Y	S/S
Slovenia	22	Y	Y	Y	Y	Y	Y	Y	Y	S
Spain	29	Y	Y	Y/Y	Y	Y/Y	Y/Y	Y	Y/Y	S
Vatican City	34	Y/Y	Y/Y	Y/Y		Υ/Y	Y/Y	Y/Y/Y	S/S	
Total	617	34	31	30	19	36	35	36	33(7)	
Y – yes / was either not yet part of the eurozone or authorized to mint euro coins; no / S – scheduled

Issued designs are made public in the Official Journal of the European Union. Although the volume and issue date of the coins are listed in the official journal, the actual figures sometimes deviate considerably from those published.

=== 2020 coinage ===
Image	Country	Feature	Volume	Date
	Italy	80th anniversary of the National Firefighters Corps	3 million coins	20 January 2020
The design shows, in the center, the logo of the National Fire Department. On the left, 'RI', acronym of the Italian Republic; on the right, the year of the coin's issue '2020'; 'R', identifying the Mint of Rome; below, 'LDS', initials of the designer Luciana De Simoni; above, arch-shaped inscription 'CORPO NAZIONALE DEI VIGILI DEL FUOCO'. The coin's outer ring depicts the 12 stars of the European flag.
	Estonia	200 years since the discovery of the Antarctic	750,000 coins	27 January 2020
The discovery is linked to Estonia because one of the first men to see Antarctica in 1820 was Fabian Gottlieb von Bellingshausen, a Baltic German seafarer born in Saaremaa, who documented the discovery. The design depicts a motif of a sailing ship. It also bear the inscriptions 'Fabian Gottlieb von Bellingshausen' and 'ANTARKTIKA 200', the country name 'EESTI' and the year of issuance '2020'. The coin's outer ring depicts the 12 stars of the European flag.
	Germany	Brandenburg's Sanssouci Palace in Potsdam; Fifteenth of the Bundesländer I series	30 million coins	28 January 2020
The design shows the Sanssouci Palace. The upper half of the coin's inner section includes the mint mark of the respective mint ('A', 'D', 'F', 'G' or 'J'), the artist's initials and the year '2020'. The lower half of the coin's inner section contains the inscription 'BRANDENBURG' and Germany's issuing country code 'D'. The coin's outer ring depicts the 12 stars of the European flag.
	France	Charles de Gaulle	18,061,940 coins	31 January 2020
The design represents two profiles of Charles de Gaulle at two different times. The profile in the background shows Charles de Gaulle in army general is uniform during the call to arms of 18 June 1940 or during the liberation of Paris. The profile in the foreground represents Charles de Gaulle during his second presidential term of office. Finally, the mention RF is semi-integrated in a Lorraine cross, symbol of free France chosen by General de Gaulle in 1940. His dates of birth and death as well as the year date are also inscribed in the Lorraine cross. The coin's outer ring depicts the 12 stars of the European flag.
	Spain	Mudéjar Architecture of Aragon; Eleventh of the UNESCO World Heritage Sites series	4 million coins	1 February 2020
The design shows the image of the tower of El Salvador de Teruel. On the left side in capital letters is the word 'ESPAÑA' and on the right side the mintmark and underneath it the year of issuance 2020. At the top in the central part, in a circular sense and in capital letters the legend 'ARQUITECTURA MUDEJAR DE ARAGÓN'. The coin's outer ring depicts the 12 stars of the European flag.
	Estonia	100th anniversary of the Treaty of Tartu	1 million coins	1 February 2020
The treaty was signed between Estonia and Soviet Russia on 2 February 1920, and it fixed the Eastern border of Estonia, bringing an end to the War of Independence. The design depicts a tree with branches disguising the words TARTU RAHU (Tartu Peace Treaty). Ity also bears the country name 'EESTI' and the date of issue '2 February 2020'. The coin's outer ring depicts the 12 stars of the European flag.
	Luxembourg	Bicentenary of the birth of Prince Henry of Orange-Nassau	313,500 coins	26 February 2020
The design shows on the right hand the effigy of His Royal Highness, the Grand Duke Henri, and on the left hand the effigy of Prince Henri. At the bottom is the name of the issuing country 'LUXEMBOURG' and the year-date '2020'. At the left, in semi-circle form, is the inscription 'Prince Henri d'Orange-Nassau' and underneath his effigy is the inscription '1820 – 1879'. The coin's outer ring depicts the 12 stars of the European flag.
	Belgium	International Year of Plant Health	155,000 coins	5 March 2020
The inner part of the piece depicts the official logo of the IYPH 2020 that symbolises leaves and the text 'International year of plant health'. The leaves represent healthy plants as the source of the oxygen we breathe, the food we eat and all life on earth. This positive image of leaves protected from deadly pests and diseases forms a circle, which represents the world and underlines how plant health and protection is a global issue. Plant health is the key to ending hunger, reducing poverty, protecting the environment and boosting economic development. As the Royal Dutch Mint will strike the coins, the mintmark of Utrecht, a mercury staff is located on the right. The Belgian mint director mintmark, the coat of arms of the municipality Herzele is located on the left. The country code BE and the year mark 2020 are located on the bottom. The coin's outer ring depicts the 12 stars of the European flag.
	San Marino	500 years since the death of Raphael	54,000 coins	5 March 2020
The design reproduces the profile of the Virgin Mary, which is part of the Madonna di Casa Santi fresco. The fresco depicts the Virgin Mary holding the infant Jesus on her lap and is imbued with the delicacy of the intimacy between mother and son, a recurring theme in Raphael's artistic works. In the top right of the coin, there is the name of the issuing country 'SAN MARINO' and the years '1520' and '2020'. At the bottom is the inscription 'RAFFAELLO', on the right the initials of the designer Annalisa Masini 'AM', and on the left the letter 'R', indicating the Mint of Rome. The coin's outer ring depicts the 12 stars of the European flag.
	Latvia	Latgalian ceramics	412,000 coins	5 June 2020
The coin is dedicated to the Latgalian pottery. The traditional pottery established itself for substantial periods of time in two districts, Latgale and Kurzeme, ut only in Latgale it has survived throughout the times and passed over to the next generations. The Latgalian pottery is included also in the Latvian Culture Canon. The design depicts a characteristic piece of Latgalian ceramics – clay candelabrum. It bears an inscription 'LATGALES KERAMIKA' (Latgalian ceramics), the country name 'LATVIJA' as well as the year of issuance '2020'. The coin's outer ring depicts the 12 stars of the European flag.
	Italy	150 years since the birth of Maria Montessori	3 million coins	9 June 2020
A portrait of Maria Montessori in a geometric composition with some of didactic elements drawn from her educational system. In the right field, 'RI', acronym of the Italian Republic; on the left, 'R', identifying the Mint of Rome; on the right, 'LDS', initials of the designer Luciana De Simoni; at the top and bottom, the dates '1870' e '2020', the year of birth of the Italian pedagogue and that of coin's issue, respectively; around the portrait, the inscription 'MARIA MONTESSORI'. The coin's outer ring depicts the 12 stars of the European flag.
	Vatican City	100 years since the birth of Pope John Paul II	74,000 coins	23 June 2020
The design features Pope John Paul II, the home where He was born and the Basilica near His home in Wadowice, Poland. At the top left, in semi-circle is the inscription 'PAPA GIOVANNI PAOLO II'. At the right are the years '1920 2020', and the mintmark 'R'. At the bottom, in semi-circle, is the name of the issuing country 'CITTA' DEL VATICANO'. Under the image of the Basilica are the artist's name 'G. TITOTTO' and the engraver's initials 'M.A.C. INC' (Maria Angela Cassol, engraver). The coin's outer ring depicts the 12 stars of the European flag.
	Greece	25th Centenary of the Battle of Thermopylae	750,000 coins	30 June 2020
The design depicts an ancient Greek helmet. Inscribed along the inner edge are the words '2500 YEARS SINCE THE BATTLE OF THERMOPYLAE' and 'HELLENIC REPUBLIC'. Also inscribed in the background are the year of issuance '2020' and a palmette (the mintmark of the Greek mint). Visible down and right of the helmet is the monogram of the artist (George Stamatopoulos). The coin's outer ring depicts the 12 stars of the European flag.
	Greece	100th anniversary of the union of Thrace with Greece	743,000 coins	16 July 2020
The design replicates an ancient coin of the Thracian city of Abdera, featuring a griffin. Inscribed along the inner edge are the words '100 YEARS SINCE THE UNION OF THRACE WITH GREECE' and 'HELLENIC REPUBLIC', as well as the year of issuance '2020' and a palmette (the mintmark of the Greek mint). Also visible at left is the monogram of the artist (George Stamatopoulos). The coin's outer ring depicts the 12 stars of the European flag.
	Malta	Skorba Temples; Fifth of the Maltese Prehistoric Sites series	180,000 coins	24 July 2020
The design features Skorba, a prehistoric temple located near the hamlet of Zebbiegh, in the northwest of Malta. The complex consists of two temples built side by side. These were built on a much older settlement remains of which were discovered outside the temple complex. Skorba lacks the monumentality of the other temples on the Maltese islands. Nevertheless, the site is of utmost importance having enabled archaeologists to set Malta's prehistoric cultural sequence and establish that the islands were first inhabited at around 5 000 BC. The inscription 'SKORBA TEMPLES 3600–2500 BC' appears at the top of the design. At the bottom are the name of the issuing country 'MALTA' and the year of issuance '2020'. The coin's outer ring depicts the 12 stars of the European flag.
	Finland	100 years since the foundation of the University of Turku	800,000 coins	18 August 2020
The grid-like design represents the interaction between universities and the society. At the top of the design, there is the year of issuance '2020', at the right side the mintmark and underneath the mintmark is the indication of the issuing country 'FI'. The coin's outer ring depicts the 12 stars of the European flag.
	San Marino	250 years since the death of Giovanni Battista Tiepolo	54,000 coins	27 August 2020
The left part of the coin features the bust of an angel, a detail from Tiepolo's painting 'Angel Succouring Hagar', which hangs in the Scuola Grande di San Rocco, Venice, and the initials of the designer Claudia Momoni 'C.M.'. Above is the inscription 'TIEPOLO' and the letter 'R' identifying the Mint of Rome; on the right are the dates 1770 and 2020 and the inscription 'San Marino'. The coin's outer ring depicts the 12 stars of the European flag.
	Portugal	730 years since the foundation of the University of Coimbra	360,000 coins	1 September 2020
The design depicts the tower of University of Coimbra and a visual composition of triangles representing the roofs of the university of Coimbra, the highest is of the Joanina Library within the lettering 'UNIVERSIDADE DE COIMBRA 730 ANOS PORTUGAL 2020' (English – UNIVERSITY OF COIMBRA 730 YEARS PORTUGAL 2020). The coin's outer ring depicts the 12 stars of the European flag.
	Lithuania	Aukštaitija; Second of the Lithuanian Ethnographical Regions series	500,000 coins	16 September 2020
The design features a coat of arms with an armour-clad knight holding a sword in his right hand. The coat of arms is held by two angels, simbolically exalting and protecting Aukštaitija – one of the most important regions of Lithuania and the cradle of its statehood. Below is a Latin inscription PATRIAM TUAM MUNDUM EXISTIMA (CONSIDER YOUR HOMELAND TO BE THE WHOLE WORLD). The design is surrounded by inscriptions: 'LIETUVA' (the name of the issuing country), 'AUKŠTAITIJA', the year of issuance '2020' and the mintmark of the Lithuanian Mint. The coin's outer ring depicts the 12 stars of the European flag.
	Portugal	75 years since the formation of the United Nations	510,000 coins	7 October 2020
The design depicts the UN logo. At the top is the year of issuance '2020', the name of the issuing country 'PORTUGAL' and the inscription 'UN 75 YEARS'. Under the words 'UN' and 'YEARS' is their translation in Portuguese 'ONU' and 'ANOS'. At the left side is the name of the mint 'CASA DA MOEDA' and at the right side is the engraver's name 'ANDRÉ LETRIA'. The coin's outer ring depicts the 12 stars of the European flag.
	Germany	50 years since the Kniefall von Warschau	30 million coins	8 October 2020
The design shows Brandt, who was the chancellor of Germany at that time, keeling before the Monument to the Ghetto Heroes in Warsaw in a gesture of humility. The Warsaw Ghetto Uprising of 1943 is evoked by the composition's powerful imagery. Traced in extremely fine relief, the design pictures compelling symbols: a seven-branched menorah, the ghetto victims, as well as the genuflection. The inner part of the coin also features the artist's initials (top), the mint mark of the respective mint ('A', 'D', 'F', 'G' or 'J'), the year, '2020' (centre left), Germany's issuing country code, 'D' (bottom right), and the lettering '50 JAHRE KNIEFALL VON WARSCHAU'. The coin's outer ring depicts the 12 stars of the European flag.
	Belgium	Jan van Eyck	155,000 coins	15 October 2020
The inner part of the piece depicts the portrait of the famous Flemish artist Jan van Eyck, together with his signature and a painter's palette that also contains the initials LL, referring to the designer of the coin, Mr Luc Luycx and two paintbrushes. Above this, you can find the name J. van Eyck. As the Royal Dutch Mint will strike the coins, the mintmark of Utrecht, a mercury staff is located on the bottom together with the Belgian mint director mintmark, the coat of arms of the municipality Herzele. The country code BE and the year mark 2020 is located on the right. The coin's outer ring depicts the 12 stars of the European flag.
	Vatican City	500 years since the death of Raphael	76,000 coins	16 October 2020
The design features a portrait of Raphael and two angels. At the right, in semi-circle, is the inscription 'RAFFAELLO SANZIO'. Above the image of the two angels are the years '1520' and '2020' and underneath it is the name of the issuing country 'CITTA' DEL VATICANO'. At the bottom is the mintmark 'R' and the artist's name 'D. LONGO'. The coin's outer ring depicts the 12 stars of the European flag.
	Monaco	300 years since the birth of Honoré III	15,000 coins	20 October 2020
The design shows the effigy of Prince Honoré III. At the left is the inscription 'HONORÉ III' and at the right the name of the issuing country 'MONACO'. At the bottom, in semi-circle, is the inscription '1720 – Naissance – 2020'. The coin's outer ring depicts the 12 stars of the European flag.
	France	Medical Research	310,000 coins	27 October 2020
The design shows the figuration of the human in union, represented by a face inscribed in a sphere. It faces the infinitely small, represented by fragments of DNA inscribed in a circle. By its oblique axis, this allegory represents the research and its intelligence dominating the infinitely small, studying it and triumphing over the diseases. The indication of the issuing country 'RF' is located at the top right while the mintmark and the year of issuance '2020' are located at the bottom left. The coin's outer ring depicts the 12 stars of the European flag.
	Lithuania	Hill of Crosses	500,000 coins	4 November 2020
The design depicts the Hill of Crosses: fragments of wooden and forged crosses, symbolising Lithuanian cross-crafting and folk culture. The inscriptions featured are: Lithuania's name 'LIETUVA', the year of issue '2020' on the top, 'KRYŽIŲ KALNAS' (the Hill of Crosses) and the mark of the Lithuanian Mint at the bottom. The coin's outer ring depicts the 12 stars of the European flag.
	Slovakia	20 years of Slovakian membership in the OECD	1 million coins	11 November 2020
The upper right half of the national side design depicts a representation of the concept of digital humanism: printed circuits in the shape of a human brain, in the centre of which is a circle representing a microprocessor. The Slovak coat of arms is placed next to the lower right edge. Inscribed inside a square outline that partly overlaps the main image are the words '20. VÝROČIE' and 'VSTUP SR DO OECD' (the 20th anniversary of Slovakia's accession to the OECD). Below the square is the name of the issuing country 'SLOVENSKO' and the year of issuance '2020', one above the other. Between the square and the left edge of the design is the mint mark of the Kremnica Mint (Mincovňa Kremnica), consisting of the letters 'MK' placed between two dies. Below the mint mark are the stylised letters 'PV' referring to the designer Peter Valach. The coin's outer ring depicts the 12 stars of the European flag.
	Finland	100 years since the birth of Väinö Linna	700,000 coins	16 November 2020
The coin celebrates the well-known late Finnish writer Väinö Linna. This year marks the centenary of his birth in 1920. The design reflects Linna's work in a textile mill and depicts, in addition to his face, letters as weaved fabric and threads that run through his books. The inscription VÄINÖ LINNA is at the left side. At the bottom are the inscriptions of the year of issuance '2020', of the issuing country 'FI' and the mintmark. The coin's outer ring depicts the 12 stars of the European flag.
	Andorra	27th Ibero-American Summit in Andorra	73,500 coins	9 December 2020
The 27th Ibero-American Summit of Heads of State and Government will be held in the Principality of Andorra in 2020. Andorra, the newest and smallest member of the Ibero-American Conference, will host this meeting of the highest political level, which comprises 19 Latin American countries together with Spain, Portugal and Andorra, in order to work towards common goals such as Sustainable Development. The design of the coin shows a tree made up by human silhouettes and tine wheels. The human silhouettes symbolize the integration of society, culture and education for the realization of a sustainable future. The tine wheels symbolize the synergy of movement between the ideas and proposals of participants to this Summit. Next to the tree, there is the logo of this 27th Summit. On its upper side, three triangles represent the colours of the Andorran flag. On its lower side, six triangles represent Andorra's opening towards Sustainable Development Goals. Around the design, there is the inscription 'XXVII CIMERA IBEROAMERICANA ANDORRA 2020' (27th Ibero-American Summit Andorra 2020). The coin's outer ring depicts the 12 stars of the European flag.
	Andorra	50 years since Andorra's introduction of women's suffrage	60,000 coins	9 December 2020
The design of the coin shows a female face inside a wrapper of endless moving lines. These lines are formed by female names in Catalan language close together, making it difficult to read them individually, as a tribute to solidarity of women in the fight for their rights. There is one repeated name only, that of 'VICTORIA' and symbolises the victory of gaining the right to vote. The inscriptions '50 ANYS DEL SUFRAGI UNIVERSAL FEMENÍ' (50 years of Universal Female Suffrage) and 'ANDORRA 1970 – 2020' complete the design. These inscriptions are also incorporated into the movement of the lines in a way, in order to give more importance to the anniversary that is being commemorated. The coin's outer ring depicts the 12 stars of the European flag.
	Malta	Children's games Fifth of the From Children in Solidarity series	220,000 coins	14 December 2020
The design depicts a melange of traditional games popular with Maltese children. These include marbles, spinning tops and traditional kite-making and flying. Depicted is also a Maltese version of hop-scotch which is known locally as 'passju'. Three bees flying in a circle allude to a popular chant sung by Maltese children during play. Included in the design is the name of the issuing country, 'Malta', and the year of issue, '2020'. The coin's outer ring depicts the 12 stars of the European flag.
	Cyprus	30 years since the foundation of the Cyprus Institute of Neurology and Genetics	412,000 coins	14 December 2020
The design depicts a 'neuron with its synapses' in reference to the activities performed by the Cyprus Institute of Neurology and Genetics, which celebrates 30 years of existence. The iossuing country's name 'KYΠΡΟΣ – KIBRIS' and the phrase 'ΙΝΣΤΙTOYΤΟ ΝΕΥΡΟΛΟΓΊΑΣ & ΓΕΝΕΤΙKHΣ KYΠΡΟY 1990–2020' (i.e. Cyprus Institute of Neurology and Genetics 1990–2020) are inscribed in circle around the design. The coin's outer ring depicts the 12 stars of the European flag.
	Slovenia	500 years since the birth of Adam Bohorič	1 million coins	23 December 2020
The design has at its core a multilingual slogan from the cover of Bohorič's Latin – Slovenian grammar titled "Proste zimske urice". The slogan in Slovenian, written in bohoričica (the type of writing named after Adam Bohorič), which is easily recognizable due to the use of a typical letter f, is positioned in the lower half of the coin's core. Behind is the Slovenian slogan in Latin – presenting Bohorič's contribution to the international academic sphere. At the top of the design, in semi-circle, is the inscription 'ADAM BOHORIČ1520 / SLOVENIJA 2020'. The coin's outer ring depicts the 12 stars of the European flag.
	Luxembourg	Birth of Prince Charles of Luxembourg	331,000 coins	24 December 2020
The design depicts at the centre the representation of Prince Charles as well as the effigies of his parents, Their Royal Highnesses the Hereditary Grand Duke Guillaume and the Hereditary Grand Duchess Stephanie. Below these effigies, the text 'S.A.R. de Prënz Charles' (His Royal Highness the Prince Charles) is followed by the date of birth '10 May 2020'. At the left, the word 'LËTZEBUERG' as the designation of the issuing country is depicted vertically. The monogram (letter 'H' with a crown) is a representation of the Grand Duke Henri. The coin's outer ring depicts the 12 stars of the European flag.

=== 2021 coinage ===
Image	Country	Feature	Volume	Date
	Portugal	Portuguese Presidency of the Council of the European Union	510,000 coins	4 January 2021
The design depicts the representation of the link between the capital of Portugal and the others European capitals and thereby draw a map, within the lettering 'PRESIDÊNCIA DO CONSELHO DA UNIÃO EUROPEIA PORTUGAL 2021' (English – PRESIDENCY OF THE COUNCIL OF THE EUROPEAN UNION PORTUGAL 2021). The coin's outer ring depicts the 12 stars of the European flag.
	Latvia	100th anniversary of the de jure recognition of the Republic of Latvia	412,000 coins	20 January 2021
It was on 26 January 1921 when Latvian diplomats had succeeded in accomplishing a momentous task – the world's great powers recognized Latvia de iure. Although Latvia declared its independence on 18 November 1918, only after a confused period of fighting, the new nation was recognized in 1920. The design depicts an artistic inscription '100 Latvija de iure 2021' thus also featuring the country name (LATVIJA) as well as the year of issue (2021). The coin's outer ring depicts the 12 stars of the European flag.
	Germany	Saxony-Anhalt's Cathedral of Magdeburg; Sixteenth of the Bundesländer I series	30 million coins	26 January 2021
The design shows the Magdeburg Cathedral, the first Gothic-style cathedral to be constructed on German soil. The inner part also features the name 'SACHSEN-ANHALT' and the issuing country's country code 'D' at the bottom, the mint mark of the respective mint ('A', 'D', 'F', 'G' or 'J') as well as the year '2021' on the left and the engraver's mark on the right. The coin's outer ring depicts the 12 stars of the European flag.
	Italy	150th anniversary of the proclamation of Rome as the capital of Italy	3 million coins	26 January 2021
The design depicts a detail of the Dea Roma, a sculpture by Angelo Zanelli inserted in the center of the Altare della Patria, a large votive altar dedicated to the Italian nation set in the Vittoriano complex in Rome. Above, the legend 'ROMA CAPITALE'; on the right, the dates '•1871•2021•', the year of the proclamation of Rome as the Capital of Italy and that of the coin's issue respectively; on the left, 'RI', acronym of the Italian Republic, and 'R', identifying the Mint of Rome; in exergue, 'UP', initials of the designer Uliana Pernazza. The coin's outer ring depicts the 12 stars of the European flag.
	France	75 years since the foundation of UNICEF	7.5 million coins	20 February 2021
The design shows an allegory of the work of 'UNICEF' where the hands are a key element. One after the other they support the globe and are the link between the different areas of the Earth. The mention of the 75th anniversary as well as the laurels crown the ensemble accompanied by the acronym RF. On the upper rim, the name 'UNICEF' is inserted along with the relevant dates as well as the UNICEF motto 'For each child'. The coin's outer ring depicts the 12 stars of the European flag.
	San Marino	450 years since the birth of Caravaggio	54,000 coins	1 March 2021
The design depicts the penitent Magdalene, detail of the homonymous work by Caravaggio, kept at the Doria Pamphilj Gallery in Rome. At the top left is the inscription 'SAN MARINO', and underneath are the dates '1571–2021'. At the left are the initials of the author Silvia Petrassi, 'SP'. At the top right are the inscription 'CARAVAGGIO' and the mintmark. The coin's outer ring depicts the 12 stars of the European flag.
	Spain	Historic city of Toledo; Twelfth of the UNESCO World Heritage Sites series	4 million coins	10 March 2021
The design depicts a view of the Puerta de Sol and a detail of the 'La Sinagoga del Tránsito', both buildings built in the fourteenth century in Mudejar style. On the left hand and in capital letters the word 'ESPAÑA' and the year of minting '2021'. At the top on the right hand the mintmark. The coin's outer ring depicts the 12 stars of the European flag.
	Finland	Journalism and Open Communication in Support of Finnish Democracy	800,000 coins	14 April 2021
The figures depicted in the inner part of the coin can be interpreted as stylized human figures made up from and entwined in a ribbon-like net. The outer sides of the inner part of the coin bear the lettering 'JOURNALISMI JOURNALISTIK'. The bottom of the inner part bears the lettering '2021 FI' preceded by the Finnish mint mark. The coin's outer ring depicts the 12 stars of the European flag.
	Luxembourg	100 years since the birth of Jean, Grand Duke of Luxembourg	332,500 coins	19 April 2021
The design depicts on the left hand side the effigy of the Grand Duke Jean and on the right hand side the effigy of the Grand Duke Henri. Close to each effigy, the respective name of the Grand Duke is specified, as well as the year of birth '1921' of the Grand Duke Jean. Below the effigies, an outline of Luxembourg city is represented. At the left, the text 'GROUSSHERZOGE VU LËTZEBUERG' designating also the issuing country is depicted in circular form. The year-date '2021' is shown at the bottom right. The coin's outer ring depicts the 12 stars of the European flag.
	Luxembourg	40 years since the wedding of Henri, Grand Duke of Luxembourg and Maria Teresa, Grand Duchess of Luxembourg	327,500 coins	19 April 2021
The design depicts the effigies of the Grand Duke Henri and the Grand Duchess Maria Teresa. Below the effigies, two wedding rings are preceded by the wedding date '14. FEBRUAR 1981' and followed by the year-date '2021'. The word 'LETZEBUERG' designating the issuing country is depicted below. The coin's outer ring depicts the 12 stars of the European flag.
	Greece	200 years since the Greek Revolution	1.5 million coins	22 April 2021
The design features the Greek flag at the centre, encircled by laurel branches. Inscribed along the inner edge are the wordings '1821 – 2021 200 YEARS SINCE THE GREEK REVOLUTION' and 'HELLENIC REPUBLIC'. Visible, at the bottom, between two laurel branches, are a palmette (the minmark of the Greek Mint) and the signature of the artist (George Stamatopoulos). The coin's outer ring depicts the 12 stars of the European flag.
	Portugal	Participation in Tokyo Summer Olympics	510,000 coins	18 May 2021
The design depicts the Portuguese Olympic Committee symbols. The design had earned the council's approval in 2020 as it was initially intended to be issued in mid-2020. However, Casa da Moeda and the Olympic Committee have agreed to postpone its issuance in accordance to the Games new calendar from 23 July to 8 August 2021, due to the COVID-19 pandemic. For that reason a few design details on the lettering have been updated, specifically the abbreviated two-digit format for the year 2020 (by using an apostrophe: 'Tóquio'20') followed by the year of issuance 2021, and finally the author's name that appears next to the Mintmark. The coin's outer ring depicts the 12 stars of the European flag.
	Lithuania	Žuvintas biosphere reserve	500,000 coins	19 May 2021
The design depicts the characteristic surroundings of Žuvintas Biosphere Reserve, which belongs to the World Network of Biosphere Reserves of UNESCO's Man and the Biosphere Programme: remote islands of a unique bird lake and Lithuania's largest wetland as well as its distinctive animals. In the foreground there is a great bittern reaching for a fire-bellied toad floating in the water. In rushes depicted on the right there is an aquatic warbler, above – a flock of common cranes and a mute swan, symbolising the establishment of the Reserve. The design is surrounded by inscriptions LIETUVA (LITHUANIA), ŽUVINTAS, UNESCO, the year of issue (2021) and the mintmark of the Lithuanian Mint. The design is realised by Eglė Ratkutė and Ernestas Žemaitis. The coin's outer ring depicts the 12 stars of the European flag.
	Estonia	Fenno-Ugria	1 million coins	16 June 2021
The national side of the coin depicts a design based on the cave drawings of Lake Äänisjärv. The symbols for the hunter, the elk, the water bird and the sun form the symbolic circle of life for the Finno-Ugric peoples. The central figure is a water bird, as they are represented in the art and folklore of all Finno-Ugric peoples. On the top right, in semi-circle, are the name of the country 'EESTI' followed by the year '2021'. At the bottom left is the inscription 'FENNO-UGRIA'. The coin's outer ring depicts the 12 stars of the European flag.
	Italy	Healthcare professionals	3 million coins	22 June 2021
The design depicts in the centre, a man and a woman in medical clothing with masks, a stethoscope and a medical folder representing doctors and nurses working on the front line in the fight against COVID-19. Above, the word 'GRAZIE' followed, on the right, by a heart symbol; on the left, a reproduction of the medical cross; in the centre, 'RI', acronym of the Italian Republic; on the right, 'R', identifying the Mint of Rome; below, on the left, 'CM', initials of the designer Claudia Momoni; in exergue, the year of the coin's issue '2021'. The coin's outer ring depicts the 12 stars of the European flag.
	Vatican City	450 years since the birth of Caravaggio	86,300 coins	25 June 2021
The design features a boy with a basket of fruits, painted by Caravaggio. At the top, in semi-circle, is the name of the issuing country 'CITTA' DEL VATICANO'. At the left is the mintmark 'R'. At the bottom is the inscription 'CARAVAGGIO' and underneath are the years '1571–2021'. At the bottom right are the initials of the artist Chiara Principe, 'CP'. The coin's outer ring depicts the 12 stars of the European flag.
	Belgium	100 years since the signing of the Belgium–Luxembourg Economic Union	155,000 coins	7 July 2021
It was a customs union and a currency union with the aim of strengthening cooperation and integration between the two countries. The union started with a first period of 50 years that was signed on 25 July 1921. Several new protocols were subsequently signed since the start of the BLEU in order to maintain it for a longer period of time. The latest protocol was signed between the two countries on 18 December 2002. The national side of the coin features the effigy of the Belgian King Philip I and that of Grand Duke Henri of Luxembourg. In addition, both countries are depicted, with the mention of the Economic Union, and the years 1921 and 2021. As the Royal Dutch Mint will strike the coins, the mintmark of Utrecht, a mercury staff is located on the bottom together with the Belgian mint director mintmark, the coat of arms of the municipality Herzele. It also contains the initials LL, referring to the designer of the coin, Mr. Luc Luycx. The coin's outer ring depicts the 12 stars of the European flag.
	Malta	Heroes of the pandemic	72,500 coins	2 August 2021
The design is created by Maria Anna Frisone and depicts two medical professional bracing themselves up to face the unknown. It is meant to extoll the services of these selfless individuals who have been on the forefront of the fight against the COVID-19 pandemic. At the top, in semi-circle, is the inscription 'HEROES OF THE PANDEMIC'. At the bottom, in semi-circle, is the inscription 'MALTA – 2021'. The coin's outer ring depicts the 12 stars of the European flag.
	Finland	100th anniversary of self-government in Åland	800,000 coins	13 August 2021
The theme of the coin is the archipelago landscape composed of embossed forms. The lower half of the design has a seaway with nautical signs, the bow of a boat and a hand holding a compass. The horizontal midline of the design has a sea horizon. The upper half of the design has sky and clouds. At the bottom, in semi-circle, is the inscription 'AUTONOMY OF THE ÅLAND ISLANDS FOR 100 YEARS' in Finnish. At the top, in semi-circle, is the inscription 'AUTONOMY OF THE ÅLAND ISLANDS FOR 100 YEARS' in Swedish. At the centre there are two diamond shaped highlights between the texts, one at the left and the other at the right. Above the diamonds, at the right side is the inscription '2021 FI' and at the left side the mintmark of the Mint of Finland. The coin's outer ring depicts the 12 stars of the European flag.
	San Marino	550 years since the birth of Albrecht Dürer	54,000 coins	27 August 2021
The design depicts the Virgin Mary with Baby Jesus, detail of the painting 'Madonna with Child' by Albrecht Dürer, kept in the Uffizi Galleries (Florence). At the left is the inscription 'SAN MARINO' and the mintmark 'R'. At the top right is the monogram 'AD' with the initials of Albrecht Dürer and at the right is the inscription 'DÜRER'. At the bottom are the initials of the author Valerio De Seta, 'VdS', and the dates '1471–2021'. The coin's outer ring depicts the 12 stars of the European flag.
	Lithuania	Dzūkija; Third of the Lithuanian Ethnographical Regions series	500,000 coins	9 September 2021
The design features a coat of arms with an armoured-clad soldier holding a halberd in his right hand and leaning with his left arm against a silver Baltic shield. The coat of arms placed on a beam is held by two lynxes. Below hangs a ribbon with a Latin inscription EX GENTE BELICOSISSIMA POPULUS LABORIOSUS (HARD-WORKING PEOPLE FROM A FIERCE TRIBE). The composition is surrounded by inscriptions LIETUVA (LITHUANIA) and DZŪKIJA, the year of issue (2021) and the mintmark of the Lithuanian Mint. The design is realised by Rolandas Rimkūnas. The coin's outer ring depicts the 12 stars of the European flag.
	France	Racing Marianne; First of the 2024 Summer Olympics series	510,000 coins	21 September 2021
Since 1896, date of their 'creation' by Frenchman Pierre de Coubertin, the Olympic Games of the modern era have been an unprecedented human gathering that has never ceased except during world conflicts. After passing through Brazil and Japan in the last two editions, the Summer Olympics are returning to Europe and this event with strong international resonance takes over the city of Paris a century after the games of 1924. On the occasion of the countdown to the Olympic Games in Paris 2024, Monnaie de Paris wishes to celebrate the road to the games through a mix of Paris and the French numismatic heritage. The intensity thus gradually rises during the years preceding the event. The design represents Marianne, national figure and icon of French numismatics, running in an 'old' way in reference to the Olympic Games of the Ancient Era. Its silhouette blends with the Eiffel Tower, a key element of Parisian heritage, to form a common axis with the Iron Lady. In the background, an athletics track in which the emblem of Paris 2024 is inserted on the left side, is depicted. The year date, the mention RF and the mintmarks are inserted under the arch of the tower. The coin's outer ring depicts the 12 stars of the European flag.
	Monaco	10 years since the wedding of Albert II, Prince of Monaco and Charlene, Princess of Monaco	15,000 coins	6 October 2021
The design shows the profile portraits of Prince Albert II and Princess Charlene. At the top, the name of the issuing country 'MONACO' appears. At the bottom, appears in a semi-circle the inscription '2011 MARIAGE PRINCIER 2021'. The coin's outer ring depicts the 12 stars of the European flag.
	Estonia	Wolf, the national mammal of Estonia; First of the Estonian National Symbols series	1 million coins	20 October 2021
The design depicts the silhouette of the wolf and a forest. Close to the edge of the inner ring the country name 'EESTI' at the left, the year of issuance '2021' at the right and the text 'CANIS LUPUS' (the wolf in Latin) at the top are depicted. The coin's outer ring depicts the 12 stars of the European flag.
	Slovenia	200 years since the foundation of the provincial museum of Carniola	1 million coins	25 October 2021
The design was inspired by the belts from Vače Situla – one of the finest artefacts of situla art. These belts are a graphical symbol for layering history that the museum keeps for future generations. The design displays layers of the museum's history with different names through its 200-year long history. The names are displayed in belts as they would have been if written on Vače Situla. The design includes the name of the country 'SLOVENIJA' and the year of issuance '2021'. The coin's outer ring depicts the 12 stars of the European flag.
	Malta	Tarxien Temples; Sixth of the Maltese Prehistoric Sites series	181,000 coins	26 October 2021
The design depicts a detail of the prehistoric structure. At the top is the inscription 'TARXIEN TEMPLES 3600–2500 BC'. At the bottom is the name of the issuing country 'MALTA' and underneath it is the year of issuance '2021'. The coin's outer ring depicts the 12 stars of the European flag.
	Vatican City	700 years since the death of Dante Alighieri	86,300 coins	26 October 2021
The design features a portrait of Dante and Palazzo Vecchio in Florence. At the top right, in semi-circle, is the name of the issuing country 'CITTÀ DEL VATICANO'. At the bottom is the inscription 'Dante' and underneath are the years '1321–2021' and the name of the artist 'P. DANIELE'. The coin's outer ring depicts the 12 stars of the European flag.
	Belgium	500 years since the issuance of the Carolus guilder	155,250 coins	27 October 2021
The most famous coin is the Golden Carolus Guilder. Charles V's pursuit of uniformity and centralization was also expressed in this series of coins. Almost 500 years after Charles V introduced his silver Carolus guilder, he was depicted on some ECU coins. The ECU, standing for European Currency Unit, was the forerunner of the euro. The national side of the coin depicts in the inner part of the piece the portrait of the Charles V, together with the text Carolus V. At the left you can find the 500 year old golden Carolus guilder, issued after the ordinance of the second period of coin issuance during the reign of Charles V. As the Royal Dutch Mint will strike the coins, the mintmark of Utrecht, a mercury staff is located on the bottom together with the Belgian mint director mintmark, the coat of arms of the municipality Herzele. It also contains the initials LL, referring to the designer of the coin, Mr. Luc Luycx. The country code BE and the year mark 2021 are located on the left. The coin's outer ring depicts the 12 stars of the European flag.
	Slovakia	100 years since the birth of Alexander Dubček	1 million coins	26 November 2021
The design depicts a left-profile portrait of Alexander Dubček. Inscribed along the left edge of the coin's inner circle is the name of the issuing country 'SLOVENSKO'. Overlying the lower part of the portrait is the name 'Alexander Dubček', first name above surname, and below it are the dates of his birth '1921' and death '1992', one above the other. At the right edge is the year of issuance '2021', and below it is the mint mark of the Kremnica Mint (Mincovňa Kremnica), consisting of the letters 'MK' placed between two dies. Next to the bottom right edge are the stylised initials 'BR', referring to the national side's designer Branislav Ronai. The coin's outer ring depicts the 12 stars of the European flag.
	Andorra	100 years since the coronation of Our Lady of Meritxell	73,750 coins	15 December 2021
The foreground of the design depicts the reproduction of the Romanesque carving of Our Lady of Meritxell (patron saint of the Principality of Andorra), which dates back from the 11th and 12th centuries. The background of the design shows a partial reproduction of the basilica sanctuary where it is located, a graphic element symbolizing a flower, the name of the issuing country 'ANDORRA' and the years '1921–2021'. The coin's outer ring depicts the 12 stars of the European flag.
	Andorra	Let's take care of our elderly	70,000 coins	15 December 2021
The subject of the coin 'CUIDEM LA NOSTRA GENT GRAN' (taking care of our seniors) is symbolized by the image of the hand of a young person holding another hand that shows all the signs of aging, with a stethoscope below them. The name of the issuing country 'ANDORRA' encircling several reproductions of the SARS-CoV-2 virus represents the State's commitment to preventing its spread and caring for its citizens. The design also shows the date of issue '2021'. The coin's outer ring depicts the 12 stars of the European flag.

=== 2022 coinage ===
Image	Country	Feature	Volume	Date
	France	90th anniversary of President Jacques Chirac's birth	9 million coins	25 January 2022
President of the French Republic for two terms, Jacques Chirac was a major architect of the European construction. As such, he was president when the Euro was introduced in 2002, whose 20th anniversary we celebrate at the beginning of this year. The design shows a solemn profile of President Jacques Chirac looking towards the future. He is surrounded by several symbols representing his actions: a euro symbol, as sign of his involvement in the introduction of the Euro and his European spirit, and a French flag represented in heraldic colours, itself embellished with the RF as a reference to his presidency. His dates and name are inserted in the Euro's logo. The mintmarks as well as the year date fit into the design. The coin's outer ring depicts the 12 stars of the European flag.
	Germany	Thuringia's Wartburg Castle in Eisenach; Seventeenth of the Bundesländer I series	30 million coins	25 January 2022
The design shows Wartburg Castle, the first German castle to be listed as a UNESCO World Heritage Site. The inner part also features the name 'THÜRINGEN' and the issuing country's country code 'D' at the bottom, the mint mark of the respective mint ('A', 'D', 'F', 'G' or 'J') as well as the engraver's mark on the right and the year '2022' on the left. The artist: Olaf Stoy (Rabenau). The coin's outer ring depicts the 12 stars of the European flag.
	Finland	100th anniversary of the Finnish National Ballet	400,000 coins	11 February 2022
The design depicts the powerful and free movements of a dancer covered in a light flowing textile that accentuates the beauty and fluidity of the dancer's pose. It also bears the year of issuance '2022' and at the top the indication of the issuing country 'FI' and the mintmark. The coin's outer ring depicts the 12 stars of the European flag.
	Slovenia	150 years since the birth of Jože Plečnik	1 million coins	2 March 2022
The design shows a detail of the grand window of the National and University library's reading room with a pillar in front of it. It is supplemented with a composition of letters A R H. P L E Č N I K. These letters are built into the window in exact order and can be metaphorically read as the architect's signature, which is actually exhibited in his own work. The letters are inserted into deepened window openings and can be understood (in the language of architect Plečnik) as spatial architectural interventions, as emphases, inserted into façade or as geometrically designed objects. The whole composition displays an idea of space that reflects the wealth of the architect's ideas. It is centred around the main pillar, which has a role to mark the coin's space and set the ratio outside – inside or front – back, one of Plečnik's common gestures when designing space. With that, the composition becomes a spatial miniature, space within space, multi-layered and mystical. At the bottom, the inscription "JOŽE PLEČNIK". At the left, vertically, the year '1872'. At the right, vertically, the country of issuance "SLOVENIJA" and underneath the year of issuance "2022". The coin's outer ring depicts the 12 stars of the European flag.
	Estonia	150 years since the founding of the Society of Estonian Literati	1 million coins	9 March 2022
The design depicts the pages of a book and the tip of a quill pen. At the top, in semi-circle are the inscription 'EESTI KIRJAMEESTE SELTS' and the year of issuance '2022'. The inscription on the pages of the book reads 'KUI ME EI SAA SUUREKS RAHVAARVULT, PEAME SAAMA SUUREKS VAIMULT', meaning 'If we cannot be a great nation in number, we must be great in spirit'. The coin's outer ring depicts the 12 stars of the European flag.
	Spain	500 years since the completion of the first circumnavigation	1 million coins	23 March 2022
The expedition began in Seville in 1519 and ended in 1522 after finishing the first circumnavigation of the Earth. The design depicts two images, one is the globe in the background and the other one is a portrait of Juan Sebastián Elcano. At the bottom of the portrait and in capital letters the legends 'JUAN SEBASTIÁN ELCANO' and 'PRIMUS CIRCUMDEDISTI ME' (First to circumnavigate me), and on the portrait shoulder is the initial and the end date of the circumnavigation (1519–1522). On the right hand side and in capital letters are the issuing country 'ESPAÑA' and the year of minting '2022'. On the left hand side is the mint mark. The coin's outer ring depicts the 12 stars of the European flag.
	Spain	Garajonay National Park (La Gomera); Thirteenth of the UNESCO World Heritage Sites series	1 million coins	23 March 2022
The Garajonay National Park is situated in the middle of the island of La Gomera.in the Canary Islands archipelago, was registered on the World Heritage Sites list for being an outstanding well-preserved example of laurisilva (Laurel forest), an exceptional ecosystem of the living remnant of the old rainforests and warm temperate forests that occupied much of Europe and North Africa during the Tertiary. The coin depicts a view of the 'Roque de Agando' and a detail of the 'Laurisilva forest'. On the upper right hand and in capital letters are the word 'ESPAÑA' and the year of minting '2022'. At the top on the right hand side is the mint mark. The coin's outer ring depicts the 12 stars of the European flag.
	Portugal	100th anniversary since the first southern transatlantic crossing by plane	1 million coins	30 March 2022
This crossing was achieved by using only internal means of navigation: a modified sextant and a course corrector. The design shows the representation of one of the three Fairey III biplanes that were used to accomplish the flight between Lisboa and Rio de Janeiro. The edge inscription reads 'TRAVESSIA DO ATLÂNTICO SUL' (English – CROSSING OF THE SOUTH ATLANTIC). Below the plane, the inscription 'PORTUGAL 1922–2022'. The Mintmark will be 'CASA DA MOEDA', the Portuguese name of the Mint. The coin's outer ring depicts the 12 stars of the European flag.
	Italy	170th anniversary of the foundation of the Polizia di Stato	3 million coins	6 April 2022
The design depicts two officers of the 'Polizia di Stato' (Italian National Police Force), a woman and a man, standing out in the foreground, in front of a police car. Above, the arc-shaped inscription 'POLIZIA DI STATO'; at the right 'RI', acronym of the Italian Republic; the inscription 'R', identifying the Mint of Rome, the initials 'AM' of the designer Annalisa Masini and the dates '1852 – 2022', appear at the left, in the centre and at the right, respectively. The coin's outer ring depicts the 12 stars of the European flag.
	Latvia	100th anniversary of the Bank of Latvia. Financial literacy	408,000 coins	12 April 2022
Financial literacy is the important ability to understand and effectively use various financial skills, including personal financial management, budgeting, and investing. Financial literacy is the foundation of our relationship with money, and it is a lifelong journey of learning. The design shows a tree, symbolizing the importance of financial literacy and the knowledge about it. At the bottom is the year of issuance '2022' and underneath the name of the issuing country 'LATVIJA'. The coin's outer ring depicts the 12 stars of the European flag.
	Lithuania	100 years of basketball in Lithuania	750,000 coins	21 April 2022
The design shows the contour of the map of Lithuania arranged as a basketball court in the centre, which signifies that basketball has been played in Lithuania already for 100 years. The coin also features the inscriptions 'LIETUVA' (Lithuania), '1922–2022' and the logo of the Lithuanian mint, its manufacturer, arranged in a semi-circle around the centre. The coin's outer ring depicts the 12 stars of the European flag.
	San Marino	530 years since the death of Piero della Francesca	55,000 coins	28 April 2022
In the centre is the profile of Federico da Montefeltro, detail of the painting 'Diptych of the Dukes of Urbino' by Piero della Francesca, kept in the Galleries of the Uffizi (Florence). At the left side in semi-circle is the inscription 'SAN MARINO'. At the right side in semi-circle is the inscription 'PIERO DELLA FRANCESCA', the years 1492 e 2022, the letter R, identifying the Mint of Rome and the initials of author Claudia Momoni, 'C.M.' The coin's outer ring depicts the 12 stars of the European flag.
	Belgium	The healthcare sector in recognition of the exceptional commitment during the COVID-19 pandemic	155,000 coins	11 May 2022
The design depicts in the inner part of the coin the health personnel. At the left you can find the inscription 'Danke – Merci – Dank u' together with various pictograms referring to healthcare sector. From top to bottom, a cross, a stethoscope, a heart, a syringe, a wheelchair and a chemical mixture are shown. At the far right are the initials of the designer Luc Luycx located. As the Royal Dutch Mint will strike the coins, the mintmark of Utrecht, a mercury staff is located on the bottom together with the Belgian mint master mark, the coat of arms of the municipality Herzele, the country code BE and the year mark 2022. The coin's outer ring depicts the 12 stars of the European flag.
	Italy	30th anniversary of the death of Giovanni Falcone and Paolo Borsellino	3 million coins	17 May 2022
The design depicts in the centre the portraits of the two Italian judges Giovanni Falcone and Paolo Borsellino, inspired by a picture of Tony Gentile. Above, the arc-shaped inscription 'FALCONE – BORSELLINO', underneath the dates '1992 2022', with the acronym of the Italian Republic 'RI' in between; on the right, 'R', identifying the Mint of Rome; on the left, 'VdS', initials of the designer Valerio de Seta. The coin's outer ring depicts the 12 stars of the European flag.
	Luxembourg	50 years since the Flag of Luxembourg	320,000 coins	1 July 2022
The design depicts at the left hand the effigy of the Grand Duke Henri and at the right hand the Luxembourg tricolor flag. The year '1972' appears above the flag and the issuing year '2022' is depicted below. At the bottom centre the name of the issuing country 'LËTZEBUERG' is represented. The coin's outer ring depicts the 12 stars of the European flag.
	Greece	200 years since the first Greek Constitution	750,000 coins	1 July 2022
he design features the temple of Asclepius at Epidaurus with the statue of the god at centre. The theme replicates the reverse of a commemorative medal on the First National Assembly held by the revolted Greeks at Epidaurus, which was awarded to the Assembly members during the reign of king Otho. Inscribed along the inner edge is the wording 'HELLENIC REPUBLIC' and 'THE FIRST GREEK CONSTITUTION', as well as the years '1822' and '2022', a palmette (the mintmark of the Greek mint) and the monogram of the artist (George Stamatopoulos). The coin's outer ring depicts the 12 stars of the European flag.
	Luxembourg	10 years since the wedding of Hereditary Grand Duke Guillaume and Hereditary Grand Duchess Stéphanie	320,000 coins	1 July 2022
The design depicts the effigies of the Hereditary Grand Duke Guillaume and the Hereditary Grand Duchesse Stéphanie. Close to the effigies, the respective names are depicted in semi-circular form. Two wedding rings appear at the left of the year-date 2022. At the bottom of the design, the word 'LËTZEBUERG' designating the issuing country is depicted, as well as the wedding date '20.Oktober 2012'. The monogram (letter 'H' with a crown) is a representation of the Grand Duke Henri. The coin's outer ring depicts the 12 stars of the European flag.
	Estonia	Glory to Ukraine	2,040,000 coins	8 July 2022
The design depicts the silhouette of a woman holding a bird in her hand, with an ear of wheat. At the top left is the text 'SLAVA UKRAINI'. At the bottom left are the name of the issuing country 'EESTI' and the year of issuance '2022'. The coin's outer ring depicts the 12 stars of the European flag.
	Vatican City	125 years since the birth of Pope Paul VI	78,250 coins	6 September 2022
The design features a portrait of the Pope. At the top left, in semi-circle, is the inscription 'CITTÀ DEL VATICANO' and at the top right is the inscription 'PAPA PAOLO VI'. At the left of the portrait are the years '1897' and '2022' and underneath them is the mintmark 'R'. At the bottom left is the name of the artist 'D. LONGO'. The coin's outer ring depicts the 12 stars of the European flag.
	Vatican City	25 years since the death of Mother Teresa	78,250 coins	6 September 2022
The design features a portrait of Mother Teresa with a child. At the top, in semi-circle, is the inscription 'MADRE TERESA DI CALCUTTA' and at the bottom is the name of the issuing country 'CITTÀ DEL VATICANO'. At the right of the portrait is the mintmark 'R' and underneath it are the years '1997' and '2022'. The coin's outer ring depicts the 12 stars of the European flag.
	Monaco	100 years since the death of Albert I, Prince of Monaco	15,000 coins	7 September 2022
The design shows the portrait of Prince Albert I. At the left is the name of the issuing country "MONACO" and at the right is the year of issuance "2022". At the bottom is the inscription "ALBERT Ier" followed by the years "1848–1922". The coin's outer ring depicts the 12 stars of the European flag.
	France	Génie de la Liberté throwing discus Second of the 2024 Summer Olympics series	260,000 coins	22 September 2022
One hundred years after the 1924 Olympic Games, France is once again hosting the Summer Games, which will take place in Paris in 2024, an event with international echo whose intensity gradually builds in the years leading up to the event. On the occasion of the countdown to the Olympic Games, Monnaie de Paris wishes to celebrate the road to the Games. It therefore plans to issue each year 2022, 2023 and 2024 a commemorative two-euro coin with an original face celebrating the Games, through the heritage of France and Paris. The design represents the genius, a national figure and icon of French numismatics. It is depicted practicing discus throwing in an 'ancient' way in reference to the Olympic Games of the Antique era. His silhouette blends with the one of the Arc de Triomphe, a key element of Parisian heritage. It forms a common axis with this emblematic monument of victory. In the background, an athletics track in which the emblem of Paris 2024 is inserted on the right side, is represented. The year date, the mention RF and the mintmarks are inserted under the arch and around the foot of the Arc. The coin's outer ring depicts the 12 stars of the European flag.
	Finland	Climatology in Finland	400,000 coins	30 September 2022
The theme of the coin is a stylized beard lichen, with its root like structure embossed in the centre of the inner part of the coin. The outer sides of the inner part of the coin bear the lettering 'CLIMATE RESEARCH' in Finnish on the left-hand side and 'CLIMATE RESEARCH' in Swedish on the right-hand side. The bottom of the inner part of the coin bears the lettering '2022 FI'. The top of the inner part of the coin bears the mintmark of the Mint of Finland. The coin's outer ring depicts the 12 stars of the European flag.
	San Marino	200 years since the death of Antonio Canova	55,000 coins	4 October 2022
The goddess Hebe is depicted in the centre of the inner ring, taken from the work of Antonio Canova, conserved at the Art gallery of the Civic Museum of San Domenico in Forlì. Around are the inscriptions 'CANOVA' and 'SAN MARINO'. At the left is the year '1822' and the initials of the author Antonio Vecchio, and at the right the year of issuance '2022' and the letter R, identifying the Mint of Rome. The coin's outer ring depicts the 12 stars of the European flag.
	Slovakia	300 years since the first steam engine for pumping pit water	1 million coins	5 October 2022
The design depicts an atmospheric steam engine for draining water from mines, the one constructed in the mining town of Nová Baňa in 1722 as the first of its kind in continental Europe. It was designed and built by English engineer Isaac Potter, whose facsimile signature is inscribed sideways, on two lines, in the lower left part of the design. On the right side of the engine, again written sideways, are the name of the issuing country 'SLOVENSKO' and, to its right, the years '1722' and '2022' separated by a medial dot. Next to the left edge of the coin's inner section, positioned one above the other, are the mint mark of the Kremnica Mint (Mincovňa Kremnica), consisting of the letters 'MK' placed between two dies, and the stylised initials of the national side designer, Peter Valach. The coin's outer ring depicts the 12 stars of the European flag.
	Malta	Hypogeum of Ħal-Saflieni; Seventh of the Maltese Prehistoric Sites series	180,000 coins	17 November 2022
The design shows a detail of the prehistoric site. At the top left is the name of the issuing country 'MALTA' and underneath the year of issuance '2022'. At the bottom is the inscription 'ĦAL – SAFLIENI HYPOGEUM' and underneath the inscription '4 000 – 2 500 BC'. At the bottom right are the initials of the creator of the design Noel Galea Bason 'NGB'. The coin's outer ring depicts the 12 stars of the European flag.
	Malta	United Nations Security Council Resolution 1325 on women, peace and security	53,000 coins	17 November 2022
The design shows three female faces. From the top left to the bottom left are the inscriptions 'WOMEN', 'PEACE', 'SECURITY', the year of issuance '2022' and the name of the issuing country 'MALTA'. At the centre, underneath the faces, are the inscriptions 'UNSCR' and '1325'. The coin's outer ring depicts the 12 stars of the European flag.
	Lithuania	Suvalkija; Fourth of the Lithuanian Ethnographical Regions series	495,000 coins	20 December 2022
The design depicts a Taurus on the escutcheon, while the escutcheon is decorated on both sides with silver oak branches with acorns. The branches are joined at the bottom with a silver ribbon bearing the inscription 'VIENYBĖ TEŽYDI' (UNITY MAY BLOSSOM). Oak branches symbolize the rich history of the region that goes back to the pagan times of the Lithuanian state. In the past, Taurus was the most widespread animal in this region. The composition is surrounded by the inscription 'LIETUVA' (LITHUANIA) and the year of issuance '2022' on the top, and the inscription 'SUVALKIJA' and the mintmark of the Lithuanian Mint at the bottom. The coin's outer ring depicts the 12 stars of the European flag.
	Andorra	Charlemagne	70,000 coins	16 January 2023
Legend has it that Emperor Charlemagne was the founder of Andorra in the year 805 and that he granted its inhabitants their own legal status. The design of the coin represents this legend deeply rooted in the history and culture of Andorra and shows, in its background, a landscape with mountains and a river, representing the rich scenery of our country, with the name of the issuing country 'ANDORRA'. The foreground of the design depicts a partial reproduction of the well-known portrait of Emperor Charlemagne by the artist Albrecht Dürer and the year of issue '2022'. The coin's outer ring depicts the 12 stars of the European flag.
	Andorra	Andorra–European Union relations	70,000 coins	16 January 2023
The different shapes and sizes of the puzzle pieces depicted in the lower part of the design symbolize the Principality of Andorra and the countries belonging to the European Union. In the upper part of the design, the stars encircling the symbol of the common European currency represent that they are all part of the euro universe. Next to them, the name of the issuing country 'ANDORRA' and the years of the commemoration '2012' and '2022' are featured. The coin's outer ring depicts the 12 stars of the European flag.

=== 2022 commonly issued coin ===
Image	Country	Feature	Volume	Date
	European Union	35 years of the Erasmus Programme	36,771,000 coins	1 July 2022
To celebrate 35 years of the Eramus programme, euro-area Finance Ministers decided that euro-area Member States would strike a 2-euro commemorative coin using a common design on the national side. The public selected the winning design by web-voting. Voters had a choice of six designs, which had been pre-selected by a professional jury following a design competition among euro area Member States, and they chose the design created by Mr Joaquin Jimenez, professional designer at the Monnaie de Paris. The design is a mix of two major elements of the Erasmus programme: the original intellectual inspiration, Erasmus himself, and the allegory of its influence over Europe. The first one is symbolised by one of the most known depiction of Erasmus. The second one is symbolised by a beam of links going across the coin from a beacon to another, representing the numerous intellectual and human exchanges between the European students. As a reference to Europe, some of these links form other stars, born from the synergy between the countries. The figure 35, for 35th anniversary comes out from the stars in a contemporary graphical style. The outer ring depicts the twelve stars of the European flag.
	Austria	35 years of the Erasmus Programme	1,060,000 coins	1 July 2022
Inscription: 1987–2022, ERASMUS PROGRAMM, REPUBLIK ÖSTERREICH
	Belgium	35 years of the Erasmus Programme	1 million coins	1 July 2022
Inscription: BE,1987–2022, ERASMUS PROGRAMME
	Cyprus	35 years of the Erasmus Programme	412,000 coins	1 July 2022
Inscription: 1987–2022, ERASMUS PROGRAMME, KYΠPOΣ, KIBRIS
	Estonia	35 years of the Erasmus Programme	1 million coins	1 July 2022
Inscription: 1987–2022, ERASMUSE PROGRAMM, EESTI
	Finland	35 years of the Erasmus Programme	401,500 coins	1 July 2022
Inscription: FI, 1987–2022, ERASMUS OHJELMA-PROGRAMMET
	Germany	35 years of the Erasmus Programme	20 million coins	1 July 2022
Inscription: D, 1987–2022, ERASMUS PROGRAMME
	Greece	35 years of the Erasmus Programme	745,000 coins	1 July 2022
Inscription: 1987–2022, ERASMUS PROGRAMME, ΕΛΛΗΝΙΚΗ ΔΗΜΟΚΡΑΤΙΑ
	Ireland	35 years of the Erasmus Programme	500,000 coins	1 July 2022
Inscription: 1987–2022, ERASMUS PROGRAMME, ÉIRE Note: In the inscription the country's name is in Gaelic type.
	Italy	35 years of the Erasmus Programme	3 million coins	1 July 2022
Inscription: RI, 1987–2022, ERASMUS PROGRAMME
	Latvia	35 years of the Erasmus Programme	308,000 coins	1 July 2022
Inscription: 1987–2022, ERASMUS PROGRAMMA, LATVIJA
	Lithuania	35 years of the Erasmus Programme	300,000 coins	1 July 2022
Inscription: 1987–2022, ERASMUS PROGRAMA, LIETUVA
	Luxembourg	35 years of the Erasmus Programme	500,000 coins	1 July 2022
Inscription: 1987–2022, ERASMUS PROGRAMME, LËTZEBUERG Note: In accordance with the national law, the coin shows an effigy of the Grand Duke as a latent image, placed at the top.
	Netherlands	35 years of the Erasmus Programme	570,000 coins	1 July 2022
Inscription: NL,1987–2022, ERASMUS PROGRAMMA
	Portugal	35 years of the Erasmus Programme	500,000 coins	1 July 2022
Inscription: 1987–2022, PROGRAMA ERASMUS, PORTUGAL
	Slovakia	35 years of the Erasmus Programme	1 million coins	1 July 2022
Inscription: 1987–2022, ERASMUS PROGRAMME, SLOVENSKO
	Slovenia	35 years of the Erasmus Programme	1 million coins	1 July 2022
Inscription: 1987–2012, PROGRAM ERASMUS, SLOVENIJA
	Spain	35 years of the Erasmus Programme	1 million coins	1 July 2022
Inscription: 1987–2022, ERASMUS PROGRAMME, ESPAÑA
	France	35 years of the Erasmus Programme	3.5 million coins	6 July 2022
Inscription: RF, 1987–2022, ERASMUS PROGRAMME
	Malta	35 years of the Erasmus Programme	82,500 coins	17 November 2022
Inscription: 1987–2022, ERASMUS PROGRAMME MALTA

=== 2023 coinage ===
Image	Country	Feature	Volume	Date
	France	La Semeuse practicing pugilism Third of the 2024 Summer Olympics series	280,000 coins	10 January 2023
One hundred years after the Paris 1924 Olympic Games, the French capital will once again host the Summer Games in 2024. One year before the launch of the Olympic Games, the Monnaie de Paris is continuing the celebration by counting down to the start of the Games by highlighting its heritage and that of Paris. An event with international echo whose intensity gradually increases in the years leading up to the event, with already several €2 commemorative coins dedicated to the Olympic Games over the past years. The design of the coin depicts the Sower, a national figure and icon of French numismatics, practicing pugilism, the forerunner of boxing, in reference to the Antic Olympic Games. Her silhouette is in the foreground in front of the Pont-Neuf and its surroundings, typical of the Ile de la Cité area, a key element of the Parisian landscape. In the background, an athletic track, into which the emblem of Paris 2024 is inserted on the right-hand side, is represented. The year date, the RF mention and the mintmarks are inserted under the arch, on the bridge railing and in the Seine. The coin's outer ring depicts the 12 stars of the European flag.
	Germany	Hamburg's Elbphilharmonie; First of the Bundesländer II series	30 million coins	24 January 2023
The design shows the Elbphilharmonie concert hall, Hamburg's newest landmark. The impressive and detailed representation of the concert building against the background of the maritime urban landscape represents the Land of Hamburg in an exceptionally convincing manner. The left half of the coin's inner section includes Germany's issuing country code, 'D', the year '2023' and the mintmark of the respective mint ('A', 'D', 'F', 'G' or 'J'). The right half features the artist's initials, and the lower part features the inscription 'HAMBURG'. The coin's outer ring depicts the 12 stars of the European flag.
	Slovakia	100 years since the first blood transfusion in Slovakia	1 million coins	2 March 2023
The design features an equilateral cross as an internationally recognised symbol of medical aid, hope and humanity. Inscribed in each arm is one of the four blood groups: A, B, 0, and AB. Incused within the cross are two more equilateral crosses, one within the other, with a drop of blood appearing at the centre of this image. Depicted around the central cross are the equally spaced lower parts of eight test tubes, each containing an incused stylised blood drop. Between each tube is a blood drop in relief. To the right of the bottom tube are the stylised initials 'MP', referring to the national side's designer Mária Poldaufová; to the left is the mint mark of the Kremnica Mint (Mincovňa Kremnica), consisting of the letters 'MK' placed between two dies. Around most of the edge of the coin's inner part is the inscription 'PRVÁ TRANSFÚZIA KRVI 1923 – 2023' (in English the words mean 'first blood transfusion'). Along the lower part of the edge is the name of the issuing country 'SLOVENSKO', with a dot on either side separating it from the inscription. The coin's outer ring depicts the 12 stars of the European flag.
	Lithuania	Together with Ukraine	500,000 coins	16 March 2023
The design features a stylised sunflower in the centre, with petals looking like silhouettes of people holding hands, embracing, protecting each other, embodying unity, support and the power of being together. Using artistic means the sunflower is designed as the rising Sun, the hope of a new beginning, birds, freedom, hope and courage, as people rising above the circumstances, never accepting any imposed will, as an allusion to those who have sacrificed their lives and their departing souls. The composition is surrounded by the inscriptions 'LIETUVA' (LITHUANIA), 'KARTU SU UKRAINA' (TOGETHER WITH UKRAINE), the year of issue '2023' and the mintmark of the Lithuanian Mint. The coin is designed by Eglė Žemaitė. The coin's outer ring depicts the 12 stars of the European flag.
	Finland	First Finnish Nature Conservation Act	400,000 coins	21 March 2023
The theme of the coin is a stylized beetle. On the top in semi-circle is the lettering 'NATURE CONSERVATION' in Finnish and at the bottom in semi-circle are the lettering 'NATURE CONSERVATION' in Swedish and the year of issuance '2023'. The right-hand side of the inner part of the coin bears the lettering 'FI'. The left-hand side of the inner part of the coin bears the mintmark of the Mint of Finland. The coin's outer ring depicts the 12 stars of the European flag.
	Italy	Italy 100 Years of the Italian Air Force	3 million coins	21 March 2023
The design depicts the reproduction of the logo of the Centenary of the Air Force. On the left 'R', identifying the Mint of Rome; above, 'RI', acronym of the Italian Republic; below, the arch-shaped inscription 'AERONAUTICA MILITARE'; on the right, 'VdS', initials of the designer Valerio De Seta. The coin's outer ring depicts the 12 stars of the European flag.
	Spain	Old Town of Cáceres; Fourteenth of the UNESCO World Heritage Sites series	1 million coins	28 March 2023
The Old Town of Cáceres is an urban ensemble located in the Autonomous Community of Extremadura in the west of the Iberian Peninsula. It was registered on the World Heritage Site list for being unique due to its historic features, which (from the Middle Ages to the classical period) bear the traces of highly diverse and contradictory influences, such as Northern Gothic, Islamic, Italian Renaissance and arts of the New World. The design depicts a panoramic view of the monumental complex, specifically of the main square. At the top and in capital letters are the word 'ESPAÑA' and the year of minting '2023'. On the upper right hand is the mintmark. At the bottom and in capital letters is the word 'CÁCERES'. The coin's outer ring depicts the 12 stars of the European flag.
	Germany	1275 birthday of Charlemagne	20 million coins	30 March 2023
The design combines two contemporary elements: Charlemagne's personal monogram and the octagon of Aachen Cathedral. The two motifs are deftly merged into a distinctive work of art. The strength of the design lies in its dynamic, three-dimensional quality. Overall, it is an innovative tribute to an outstanding figure in European history. The coin's inner ring also features the inscription 'KARL DER GROßE' ('Charlemagne') at the top and, in the bottom half, the year of issue '2023', the dates '748–814', Germany's issuing country code 'D', the mint mark of the respective mint ('A', 'D', 'F', 'G' or 'J') and the artist's initials ('TW'). The coin's outer ring depicts the 12 stars of the European flag.
	Luxembourg	25th anniversary of the admission of Grand Duke Henri as a member of the International Olympic Committee	500,000 coins	24 April 2023
The design depicts the effigy of the Grand Duke Henri looking to the right and to the figure '25'. Several pictograms of Olympic disciplines are shown close to the effigy. Below the effigy, three intersecting circles are enriching the design. At the bottom right, the text 'MEMBER VUM INTERNATIONALEN OLYMPESCHE KOMMITEE' is depicted. The name of the country 'LËTZEBUERG' as well as the text 'GROUSSHERZOG HENRI' are represented at the left. The coin's outer ring depicts the 12 stars of the European flag.
	Luxembourg	175th Anniversary of the Chamber of Deputies and the First Constitution	500,000 coins	24 April 2023
The design depicts at the left-hand side the effigy of the Grand Duke Henri and at the right-hand side the building of the Chamber of Deputies. The year date '1848' and the text 'Chambre des députés' appear above and at the right of the building. At the bottom centre, the name of the issuing country 'LUXEMBOURG' as well as the issuing year date '2023' are represented. The coin's outer ring depicts the 12 stars of the European flag.
	San Marino	500th anniversary of the death of Pietro Perugino	56,000 coins	27 April 2023
The design shows in the centre the Virgin Mary with the Child Jesus, detail of the painting 'Madonna with Child, Saint Sebastian and Saint John the Baptist' by Perugino, preserved in the Uffizi Galleries (Florence). At the left-hand side are the inscription 'PERUGINO', the dates '1523' and '2023' and the mintmark 'R'. At the right- hand side is the name of the issuing country 'SAN MARINO' and at the bottom right are the initials of the author Maria Angela Cassol, MAC. The coin's outer ring depicts the 12 stars of the European flag.
	Estonia	Barn swallow, the national bird of Estonia; Second of the Estonian National Symbols series	1 million coins	12 May 2023
The design depicts the silhouette of the barn swallow with the text 'HIRUNDO RUSTICA' (the barn swallow in Latin) at the top right, in semi-circle. At the bottom is the name of the issuing country 'EESTI' and underneath the year of issuance '2023'. The coin's outer ring depicts the 12 stars of the European flag.
	Italy	150th anniversary of the death of Alessandro Manzoni	3 million coins	15 May 2023
The design features the half-length portrait of Alessandro Manzoni, inspired by the image of the Italian writer as depicted on the 100 000 lire banknote issued in 1967. On the left, 'RI', acronym of the Italian Republic, the dates '1873–2023', the year of the death of the writer and the year of the coin's issue, respectively, and the arch-shaped inscription 'ALESSANDRO MANZONI'. On the right, 'R', identifying the Mint of Rome, and 'AV', initials of the designer Antonio Vecchio. The coin's outer ring depicts the 12 stars of the European flag.
	Latvia	The Ukraine Sunflower	415,000 coins	30 May 2023
The design represents a sunflower, which is one of the national symbols of Ukraine, as Ukraine is one of the biggest sunflower oil producers and exporters worldwide. Since the start of the war in Ukraine, the sunflower has become a global symbol for peace. For the first time sunflowers were used as a peace symbol in the summer of 1996. Then they were planted in a military base near Pervomaysk, approximately 155 miles south of the capital Kyiv. Now sunflowers are used as a symbol of peace and support to Ukraine worldwide. At the top, in semi-circle, is the inscription 'SLAVA UKRAINAI!' (Glory to Ukraine) and at the bottom, in semi-circle, is the name of the issuing country 'LATVIJA' followed by the year of issuance '2023'. The author of the design is the Latvian artist Krišs Salmanis. The coin's outer ring depicts the 12 stars of the European flag.
	Monaco	The centenary of the birth of Prince Rainier III	25,000 coins	1 June 2023
The design shows the portrait of Prince Rainier III. At the top, in semi-circle, is the name of the issuing country 'MONACO' followed by the year of issuance '2023'. At the bottom is the inscription 'RAINIER III' followed by the date ' 31 MAI 1923 '. The coin's outer ring depicts the 12 stars of the European flag.
	Vatican City	The 5th Centenary of the death of Pietro Perugino	82,500 coins	20 June 2023
The design features Perugino's portrait and a particular of the Baptism, fresco in the Sistine Chapel in the Vatican. At the top right, in semi-circle, is the inscription 'CITTÀ DEL VATICANO'. At the bottom is the inscription 'PERUGINO' and underneath it the dates '1523◦2023'. At the left is the mintmark 'R'. The coin's outer ring depicts the 12 stars of the European flag.
	Belgium	The 'year of art nouveau', which takes place during 2023 in Belgium	155,000 coins	20 June 2023
The design shows a decorative detail from the facade of the 'Hotel Van Eetvelde', an iconic town house in Brussels which has been designed by the Belgian art nouveau architect Victor Horta and has been recognized as Unesco World Heritage. The curved, asymmetrical lines of this decorative detail reflect the characteristic nature-inspired style of the art nouveau movement. This detail fills up the bottom half of the piece, leaving a vacant space on the upper half, which is filled with the description 'ART NOUVEAU'. At the far right are the initials of the designer Iris Bruijns located. As the Royal Dutch Mint will strike the coins, the mintmark of Utrecht, a mercury staff is located on the far left together with the Belgian mint director mintmark, an aster flower in front of an Erlenmeyer flask, the country code BE and the year mark 2023. The coin's outer ring depicts the 12 stars of the European flag.
	Ireland	50th anniversary of Ireland's membership of the European Union	500,000 coins	22 June 2023
The design depicts a modification to the 'EU50' programme logo used by Government Departments to promote events marking the 50th anniversary of Ireland joining the European Economic Community (EEC), the predecessor to the EU. The Irish-language name of the issuing country 'ÉIRE' is inserted above the logo. The year '1973' is referenced to recognise the year Ireland joined the EEC as well as '2023' to mark the coin issue year. The coin's outer ring depicts the 12 stars of the European flag.
	Greece	100th anniversary of the birth of Maria Callas	750,000 coins	27 June 2023
The design features a portrait of the legendary Greek soprano Maria Callas. Inscribed along the inner edge is the wording '100 YEARS FROM THE BIRTH OF MARIA CALLAS', and at the right the minting year '2023' and a palmette (mintmark of the Greek Mint); below the portrait runs the inscription 'HELLENIC REPUBLIC'. The coin's outer ring depicts the 12 stars of the European flag.
	Spain	The Spanish Presidency of the Council of the EU	1.5 million coins	1 July 2023
The design shows two images. The first one is the logo of the Spanish Presidency of the Council of the EU. Surrounding the logo are the captions: "ESPANA 2023 – PRESIDENCIA ESPANOLA" and "CONSEJO DE LA UNION EUROPEA" (Spain 2023 – Spanish Presidency and Council of the European Union). The second image, in the lower part, represents the mint mark of the Fabrica Nacional de Moneda y Timbre Real Casa de la Moneda with the crowned "M". The coin's outer ring depicts the 12 stars of the European flag.
	France	2023 Rugby World Cup	15 million coins	4 July 2023
On the occasion of the Rugby World Cup organised in France, Monnaie de Paris celebrates rugby and this competition which will bring together teams from twenty nations. The design represents a stylized rugby player making a pass. In the background, the rugby field is the globe on which the rugby goalposts are placed. The set is part of an imaginary rugby galaxy where the other planets are oval. The emblem of the competition is inserted next to the player, while the name of the competition surrounds the design. The indication of the issuing country 'RF', the mintmark and the mint master mark are inserted under the image on the right-hand side. The name of the competition, the issuing country 'FRANCE' and the year '2023' are inserted on the left hand side. The name of the competition surrounding the design, as well as and the 'RF' mention appear in the official font of the event, called Mobius. The coin's outer ring depicts the 12 stars of the European flag.
	Portugal	World Youth Day 2023	1 million coins	19 July 2023
The World Youth Day (WYD) was held in Lisbon in August 2023. WYD is a worldwide encounter of young people, who want to take part in a festive gathering with the Pope and with hundreds of thousands of other youths who share the same universal principles of peace, union and fraternity all around the world. The design depicts the Pilgrim Cross, a set of human-like figures of different sizes and textures displayed as in a globe. At the bottom, two hands envelop the whole in a welcoming gesture of the inclusion and universality that is implied in this gathering. On the top edge, two inscriptions read 'JORNADA MUNDIAL DA JUVENTUDE' (Portuguese for WORLD YOUTH DAY) and 'LISBOA 2023'. On the bellow edge, the coat of arms of Portugal, the inscription 'PORTUGAL', the mintmark 'CASA DA MOEDA' (the name of the Portuguese Mint) and the name of the designer 'JOÃO DUARTE'. The coin's outer ring depicts the 12 stars of the European flag.
	Finland	Social and Health Services	400,000 coins	7 August 2023
The design represents a stylized map of Finland. The left-hand side bears the lettering 'WELL-BEING' in Finnish and Swedish. The year of issuance '2023' is slightly on the left-hand side in the middle of the coin. At the bottom is the indication of the issuing country 'FI'. At the right hand-side is the mintmark of the Mint of Finland. The coin's outer ring depicts the 12 stars of the European flag.
	San Marino	500th anniversary of the death of Luca Signorelli	56,000 coins	5 September 2023
The design shows an angel in the centre, a detail from the painting 'Il Paradiso' by Luca Signorelli, preserved in the Chapel of San Brizio in the Cathedral of Orvieto. At the left-hand side is the letter R, identifying the Mint of Rome. In semi-circle at the bottom left is the word 'SIGNORELLI'. At the right-hand side is the name of the issuing country 'SAN MARINO', and at the top the years '1523 2023'. In the lower centre are the initials of the author Marta Bonifacio, MB. The coin's outer ring depicts the 12 stars of the European flag.
	Malta	225th anniversary of the French invasion of Malta	85,500 coins	14 September 2023
In June 1798, Napoleon Bonaparte ended the rule of the Order of St John in Malta. During his short stay in Malta, Napoleon established a Republican Government and issued a thorough reform of laws and institutions of Malta. Amongst other things, slavery and the privileges of nobility were abolished. A lay state was established, and the court of the Inquisition was closed. At the time, the far-reaching reforms were not universally accepted by the Maltese, and it was not long before they rebelled. The design depicts a personification of the French Republic as depicted on the official letterheads of the period. At the left-hand side is the inscription '225th ANNIVERSARY' followed from the top to the right, in semi-circle, by the inscription 'ARRIVAL OF THE FRENCH IN MALTA'. At the bottom is the year of issuance '2023'. The inscriptions 'Liberté' (Freedom) and 'Egalité' (Equality) are at the left and right side of the image, respectively. At the top left of the inscription 'Egalité' are the years '1798–2023'. The coin's outer ring depicts the 12 stars of the European flag.
	Malta	550th anniversary of the birth of Nicolaus Copernicus	95,500 coins	14 September 2023
The design depicts a profile portrait of Copernicus, together with a stylized heliocentric representation of the universe as proposed by Copernicus. At the top left is the inscription 'NICOLAUS COPERNICUS 1473 – 1543' and at the bottom left is the name of the issuing country 'MALTA' followed by the year of issuance '2023'. Also at the bottom is the signature of the artist Daniela Fusco 'FUSCO'. The coin's outer ring depicts the 12 stars of the European flag.
	Greece	150th anniversary the birth of Constantin Carathéodory	750,000 coins	14 September 2023
The design features a portrait of the Greek mathematician Constantin Carathéodory. Inscribed along the inner edge at the left is the wording 'CONSTANTIN CARATHÉODORY 1873–1950', and at right the minting year '2023' and a palmette (mintmark of the Greek Mint); below the portrait runs the inscription 'HELLENIC REPUBLIC'. The coin's outer ring depicts the 12 stars of the European flag.
	Croatia	The introduction of the euro as the official currency of Croatia	250,000 coins	15 September 2023
The design features the inscriptions of the issuing country 'HRVATSKA' (Croatia) and the year of issuance '2023.', depicted horizontally, as well as the words 'ČLANICA EUROPODRUČJA' (member of the euro area), which are inscribed along the outer edge of the coin's core. These inscriptions symbolically form a stylised symbol of the euro '€'. The other central motive of the coin is Croatia's distinctive and recognisable symbol, the Croatian checkerboard, which represents part of the coat of arms of the Republic of Croatia. The coin's outer ring depicts the 12 stars of the European flag.
	Cyprus	The 60th anniversary of the foundation of the Central Bank of Cyprus	412,000 coins	2 October 2023
The design depicts tools on a microchip symbolising the stability of the economy in the modern industrial and digital era secured by the Central Bank of Cyprus, which celebrates 60 years of existence. The issuing country's name 'ΚYΠΡΟΣ KIBRIS' and the dates '1963–2023' are at the bottom. Additionally, the phrase '60 ΧΡΟΝΙΑ ΑΠO ΤΗΝ IΔΡΥΣΗ ΤΗΣ ΚΕΝΤΡΙKHΣ ΤΡAΠΕΖΑΣ ΤΗΣ ΚYΠΡΟΥ' (i.e. 60 years since the foundation of the Central Bank of Cyprus) is inscribed on the inner part of the national side of the coin. The coin's outer ring depicts the 12 stars of the European flag.
	Slovakia	200 years since the start of regular stagecoaches Vienna–Bratislava	1 million coins	11 October 2023
The design's symbolic depiction of the express mail coach service between Vienna and Bratislava features a horse-drawn coach in rapid motion and a centrally placed rectangular inset containing a post-horn. Inscribed below the image is the year '1823', when the express mail service began operation, and below that date are the city names in Slovak, 'VIEDEŇ' and 'BRATISLAVA', one above the other. At the bottom of the coin's inner circle is the year of issuance '2023', separated from the text above by a horizontal line. The name of the issuing country 'SLOVENSKO' is inscribed along the upper edge of the design. To the right of the coach is the mint mark of the Kremnica Mint (Mincovňa Kremnica), consisting of the letters 'MK' placed between two dies. Just below the mark are the stylised initials 'MP', referring to the national side's designer Mária Poldaufová. The coin's outer ring depicts the 12 stars of the European flag.
	Belgium	75 Years of Women's Voting Rights in Belgium	120,000 coins	25 October 2023
The design depicts in the centre a box on a ballot paper, which is being coloured in by a pencil. The coloured box is overlapped by the Venus symbol (the gender symbol for woman/female). At the bottom left next to the central image is inscribed 75 JAAR ANS. Surrounding the central image are also inscriptions in Dutch and French: 'ALGEMEEN VROUWENKIESRECHT' – 'SUFFRAGE UNIVERSEL FÉMININ'. At the bottom of the piece are located the initials of the designer Iris Bruijns. As the Royal Dutch Mint will strike the coins, the mintmark of Utrecht, a mercury staff is located at the right side of the piece, together with the Belgian mint master mark, an aster flower in front of an Erlenmeyer flask, the country code 'BE' and the year mark '2023'. The coin's outer ring depicts the 12 stars of the European flag.
	Vatican City	150th anniversary of the death of Alessandro Manzoni	82,500 coins	27 October 2023
The design features Manzoni's portrait, a pen and the beginning of his masterpiece, 'I Promessi Sposi'. At the top, from left to right, in semi-circle, is the inscription 'CITTÀ DEL VATICANO'. At the bottom is the inscription 'Alessandro Manzoni' and underneath it the dates '1873◦2023'. At the left is the mintmark 'R'. The coin's outer ring depicts the 12 stars of the European flag.
	Portugal	Peace among nations	1 million coins	15 November 2023
The coin is dedicated to Peace among nations and to friendly and mutually beneficial coexistence. The search for peace must sit on a collective effort towards a common purpose. In the current highly polarized geopolitical context, this coin is aimed to help remind of the urgence to protect the priceless asset that is peace. The design radially displays the word 'PAZ' (PEACE) in the 16 official idioms spoken in all 20 countries of the Euro Zone as of January 2023. The inscription at the top reads 'PORTUGAL', followed by the year of issuance '2023' at the top right; at the top left is the name of the designer 'José S. Teixeira' and at the left the mintmark 'CASA DA MOEDA', the name of the Portuguese Mint. The coin's outer ring depicts the 12 stars of the European flag.
	Andorra	Summer solstice fire festivals in the Pyrenees	70,000 coins	27 November 2023
The summer solstice fire festivals were inscribed on UNESCO's Representative List of the Intangible Cultural Heritage of Humanity in 2015. They are traditional and popular festivities widely celebrated in Andorra each year. The design reproduces a human figure, named 'fallaire', wearing a traditional cape and tracing a circle of fire with the 'falla'. This is the main element of the festival and consists of tree barks that, once lit, they are energetically whirled around creating large circles of fire. The graphic composition of lines in the background of the design represents the summer solstice together with the name of the issuing country 'ANDORRA' and the year '2023'. The coin's outer ring depicts the 12 stars of the European flag.
	Andorra	30 years of the entry of the Principality of Andorra into the United Nations	70,000 coins	27 November 2023
The United Nations is represented by two symbolic elements: two laurel wreaths and a globe, which forms part of the number 30 that has been represented, with the inscription ANYS (years) and the year date 2023 below. In the upper part of the design there is the coat of arms of Andorra and the inscription 'ANDORRA MEMBRE DE LES NACIONS UNIDES' (Andorra member of the United Nations). The coin's outer ring depicts the 12 stars of the European flag.
	Slovenia	150th anniversary of the birth of Josip Plemelj	990,250 coins	19 December 2023
The design displays parts of the equation that Josip Plemelj solved as a first person in the world. Numbers and symbols rotate on circumferences that depict planet rotation, movement in space, as well as composing individual unsolvable elements into whole. That way the design shows both fields of Josip Plemelj's work, i.e. mathematics and astronomy. The inscription 'JOSIP PLEMELJ 1873', the name of the issuing country 'SLOVENIJA' and the year of issuance '2023' are integrated in the design. The coin's outer ring depicts the 12 stars of the European flag.

=== 2024 coinage ===
Image	Country	Feature	Volume	Date
	France	Hercules practicing antique wrestling with Notre-Dame's Chimera; Fourth of the 2024 Summer Olympics series	510,000 coins	9 January 2024
For the countdown to the Paris 2024 Olympic Games, Monnaie de Paris celebrates the road to the games through Paris as well as its own heritage. 100 years after the 1924 Games, the French capital is once again hosting the Summer Games. This is an event with international resonance, gradually building in intensity in the years leading up to the event, culminating in 2024 with the issue of two commemorative two-euro coins dedicated to the Olympic Games. The design represents Hercules, a national figure and icon of French numismatics, practicing antique wrestling with Notre-Dame's Chimera, in reference to the Olympic Games of the Ancient era. Both wrestlers are depicted in the foreground in front of Notre-Dame Cathedral. In the background, an athletics track in which the emblem of Paris 2024 is inserted on the left side, is represented. The yeardate, the RF indication, as well as the mintmarks are inserted on the athletics track. The coin's outer ring depicts the 12 stars of the European flag.
	Belgium	The Belgian Presidency of the Council of the EU	2,130,000 coins	15 January 2024
The design depicts a flock of birds (swallows), which is a symbol for the workings of the EU, by moving together as a group yet with each member having room to manoeuvre in an individual manner, thereby creating one complex, dynamic entity. The group therefore primarily stands for togetherness. During the flight of the swallows, there is always one who pulls the head and takes the group in tow, which will be Belgium in the first half of 2024. The 27 birds also symbolise the total number of EU member states. The country code 'BE' is located in between the birds, in the upper right side of the design. Underneath the flock of birds, a vacant space on the lower half is filled with the description 'BELGIAN PRESIDENCY OF THE COUNCIL OF THE EU 2024'. At the far left are the initials of the designer Iris Bruijns. As the Royal Dutch Mint will strike the coins, the mintmark of Utrecht, a mercury staff is also located on the far left, above which stands the Belgian mint director mintmark, an aster flower in front of an Erlenmeyer flask. The coin's outer ring depicts the 12 stars of the European flag.
	Luxembourg	175th anniversary of the death of Grand Duke Guillaume II	133,500 coins	29 January 2024
The design depicts on the left side the statue of Grand Duke Guillaume II on horseback and on the right side the effigy of Grand Duke Henri looking to the left. The texts 'GROUSSHERZOGE VU LÉTZEBUERG' and 'GUILLAUME II 1792–1849' are depicted in semicircular form in the upper left part of the design. The year-date '2024' and the figure '175' as indication of the anniversary appear below the effigy of Grand Duke Henri. As the producing mint is not yet known, the mint marks might be adapted within the spaceholder. The coin's outer ring depicts the 12 stars of the European flag.
	Luxembourg	100th anniversary of the introduction of the franc coins with the Feierstëppler	133,500 coins	29 January 2024
The design depicts in its centre the representation of the Luxembourg coin issued in 1924 showing a steel industry worker, this representation being integrated in the figure '100' as indication of the anniversary of the first issuance of one of the longest circulating Luxembourg franc coins. The name of the issuing country LÉTZEBUERG as well as the year date 2024 appear at the top of the design. The bottom of the design depicts the word 'FEIERSTÉPPLER', the common and popular designation of this coin. The monogram (letter 'H' with a crown) is a representation of Grand Duke Henri. As the producing mint is not yet known, the mint marks might be adapted within the spaceholder. The coin's outer ring depicts the 12 stars of the European flag.
	Germany	Königsstuhl in Jasmund National Park; Second of the Bundesländer II series	30 million coins	30 January 2024
The coin is dedicated to the German state (Land) of Mecklenburg-Western Pomerania. It is the second issuance in the second series of German 2-euro commemorative coins featuring the German states, or Länder. Each year, a coin pays tribute to one of the 16 Länder by depicting a significant building or landmark. The order of the states is based on the rotating presidency of the Bundesrat, which is one of the five permanent constitutional bodies of the Federal Republic of Germany and represents the interests of the Länder. The design shows the Königsstuhl, an iconic formation of chalk cliffs and beech forest located in Jasmund National Park on the island of Rügen. The cliffs are depicted from the perspective of the shoreline, thereby highlighting the monumentality of this unique natural landmark in a particularly effective manner. The beautifully detailed image provides scale through the combined rendering of sea, birdlife and humankind. The modern typography, in harmony with the flying seagull, is skilfully integrated into the relief. The upper half of the coin's inner circle features the inscription 'MECKLENBURG VORPOMMERN', the year of issue '2024', Germany's issuing country code 'D' and, at the upper right, the letter 'X' as placeholder for the mint mark of the respective mint ('A', 'D', 'F', 'G' or 'J'). The initials of the artist Michael Otto (from Rodenbach, Germany) are shown in the lower half of the inner circle. The coin's outer ring depicts the 12 stars of the European flag.
	Spain	200th anniversary of the founding of National Police as a state security corp	1.5 million coins	2 February 2024
The design shows the emblem of the National Police. Surrounding it are the legends: 'ESPANA- POLICIA NACIONAL 1824–2024'. In the lower right part of the emblem is the mint mark 'Eme Coronada'. The coin's outer ring depicts the 12 stars of the European flag.
	Spain	Cathedral, Alcázar and General Archive of the Indies in Seville; Fifteenth of the UNESCO World Heritage Sites series	1.5 million coins	2 February 2024
The design shows a view of the 'Patio de las Doncellas' of the Real Alcåzar of Seville. At the top, in a circular direction and in capital letters, the legend SEVILLA; below, the mint mark 'Eme Coronada'. At the bottom, in a circular direction and in capital letters, the legend ESPANA and the year of issue 2024. The coin's outer ring depicts the 12 stars of the European flag.
	Italy	250th anniversary of the founding of the Financial Police corps	3 million coins	12 March 2024
The design depicts, in the centre, a stylized version of the heraldic symbol of Guardia di Finanza Corps: it portrays the concept of security and provides a future vision of the Corps' role celebrating the past, by combining it with the years to come and challenges they will continue to face. This emblem includes different elements: mountain, sea and the sky, which are the natural environments where Corps operate; the Griffon, a mythological animal which, according to the legend, supervises protection of the Treasury, represented by the chest of the State, and the turreted crown. At the top, in semi-circle, is the inscription 'GUARDIA DI FINANZA'. Below, 'RI', acronym of the Italian Republic and the dates '1774–2024', year of the establishment of the Guardia di Finanza Corps and year of coin's issue respectively; on the right, 'R', identifying the Mint of Rome and 'MB', the initials of designer Marta Bonifacio. The coin's outer ring depicts the 12 stars of the European flag.
	Finland	Elections and Democracy	400,000 coins	14 March 2024
The design shows stylized ballots. Ballots consist of circles and rectangles. The subject is abstract, but still recognizable. There are eight ballots, and they are partially overlapped, creating smaller geometric shapes at the intersections of the overlapping tickets. The year 2024 is at the bottom. The lettering 'FI' is on the right-hand side slightly above the midline. The text VAALIT ♦ DEMOKRATIA rotates on the right-hand side of the money ring. The text VAL ♦ DEMOKRATI is circling the coin on the left-hand side. The coin's outer ring depicts the 12 stars of the European flag.
	Germany	175th anniversary of the Paulskirche Constitution	30 million coins	21 March 2024
The design features several thematic layers. In the foreground is a perspective depiction of St Paul's Church with the representatives of the national constitutional assembly filing in. This overlays a rendering of the constitutional document and a quill, representing the outcome of the Frankfurt Parliament. Finally, the design is crowned by three female allegories – Unity, Justice and Freedom – and the tricolour flag of black, red and gold. The vibrant three-dimensional relief evokes the timelessness of the basic democratic principles that were put down in writing for the first time and in a foundational way in the Frankfurt Constitution. The coin's inner ring also features the inscription 'PAULSKIRCHENVERFASSUNG 1849' ('St Paul's Church Constitution 1849') and, at the bottom, the year of issue '2024', Germany's issuing country code 'D', the mint mark of the respective mint ('A', 'D', 'F', 'G' or 'J'), and the initials of the artist, Bodo Broschat from Berlin. The coin's outer ring depicts the 12 stars of the European flag.
	Italy	Rita Levi-Montalcini	3 million coins	22 April 2024
The design depicts in the foreground, a half-length portrait of Rita Levi-Montalcini inspired by a Manuela Fabbri's photography; in the background, a microscope, taken from a medal designed by Gino Levi-Montalcini, brother of the well renown scientist, whose base is horseshoe shaped, as a good luck charm for the awarding of the Nobel Prize for Medicine in the 1986. Above, the arch-shaped inscription 'RITA LEVI-MONTALCINI'; on the left 'RI', acronym of the Italian Republic and 'R', identifying the Mint of Rome; below '2024', the year of the coin's issue; on the right, 'SP', initials of the designer Silvia Petrassi. The coin's outer ring depicts the 12 stars of the European flag.
	Portugal	50th anniversary of Revolution of the Carnations on 25 April 1974	515,000 coins	22 April 2024
The 25 April 1974 is the date of the revolution that marked the establishment of the democratic rule in Portugal and the beginning of a journey of profound economic, social and cultural transformations that led to the Europeanization of the country. At the centre of the design, a carnation symbolizes the revolution, surrounded by multiple eccentric circles that suggest that people's actions and beliefs may change over the years, but remain essentially true to the principles of the revolution. On the edge, on the right, the verse 'Esta é a madrugada que eu esperava' [This is the dawn I have been waiting for], and the name of its author, poet 'Sophia de Mello Breyner Andresen'; and on the left by the national coat of arms, the captions 'Portugal' and ' 25 April 1974_2024', followed by the name of the designer and the mintmark 'Casa da Moeda', the name of the Portuguese Mint. The coin's outer ring depicts the 12 stars of the European flag.
	San Marino	50th anniversary of the Declaration of Civil Rights and the Fundamental Principles of the Legal System of San Marino	59,000 coins	23 April 2024
In the centre is represented an open book bearing the inscription 'I DIRITTI DELLA PERSONA UMANA SONO INVIOLABILI' (The rights of the human person are inviolable), taken from Article 5 of the Law n°59 of 8 July 1974 'Declaration of Citizens' Rights and of the fundamental principles of the San Marinese legal order'. At the top are the silhouettes of the Statue of Liberty and the Public Palace, as well as the name of the issuing country 'SAN MARINO'. On the left, the letter 'R', identifying the Mint of Rome. At the bottom centre is the year of issuance '2024' and the initials of the engraver Emanuele Ferretti ('E.F. INC. '). The coin's outer ring depicts the 12 stars of the European flag.
	Belgium	Fight against cancer	2,130,000 coins	13 May 2024
The design shows in the centre a ribbon, which is used as a universal symbol to express engagement in the fight against cancer. The shape of the ribbon extends further along the two sides in curved lines, symbolising the movement of a heartbeat on a monitor, as an expression of life and vitality. Three lines can be seen at the top, as a reference to a rainbow (symbolising hope and consolation). Inserted in the bottom line is the country code BE and the year 2024. In the lower part of the piece are inscriptions in French and Dutch: 'Lutte contre le cancer' – 'Strijd tegen kanker'. The initials of the designer Iris Bruijns are located on the left side above the inscriptions. As the Royal Dutch Mint will strike the coins, the mintmark of Utrecht, a mercury staff is located at the very bottom of the piece, together with the Belgian mint director mintmark, an aster flower in front of an Erlenmeyer flask. The coin's outer ring depicts the 12 stars of the European flag.
	Estonia	Cornflower, the national flower of Estonia; Third of the Estonian National Symbols series	1 million coins	21 May 2024
The design shows the silhouette of a cornflower with the text 'CENTAUREA CYANUS' (cornflower in Latin) at the top left, in semi-circle. At the bottom is the name of the issuing country 'EESTI' and underneath the year of issuance '2024'. The coin's outer ring depicts the 12 stars of the European flag.
	France	Summer Olympics in Paris 2024	24,034,000 coins	4 June 2024
For the countdown to the Paris 2024 Olympic Games, Monnaie de Paris celebrates the road to the games through Paris as well as its own heritage. 100 years after the 1924 Games, the French capital is once again hosting the Summer Games. This is an event with international resonance, gradually building in intensity in the years leading up to the event, culminating in 2024 with the issue of two commemorative two-euro coins dedicated to the Olympic Games. The design represents an expression of France through iconic buildings; the Eiffel Tower and the Notre Dame de la Garde Basilica situated in Marseille are united there. In the background, a tiare flower represents the island of Tahiti where the surfing competitions will take place. The Eiffel Tower is in motion, she carries the values of sport. Its arms are represented by 73 rivets signifying the host communities. For the first time, the Olympic and Paralympic symbols are brought together, to celebrate the Games for all. The year date, the indication of the issuing country 'RF' as well as the mintmarks are inserted on the athletics track. The coin's outer ring depicts the 12 stars of the European flag.
	Greece	100th anniversary of the birth of children's book author Penelope Delta	750,000 coins	17 June 2024
The design features a portrait of Penelope Delta. The theme is bordered by the wording 'ΠΗΝΕΛΟΠΗ ΔΕΛΤΑ 1874–1941' ('PENELOPE DELTA 1874–1941') and 'ΕΛΛΗΝΙΚΗ ΔΗΜΟΚΡΑΤΙΑ' ('HELLENIC REPUBLIC'). To the left is a palmette (mintmark of the Greek Mint) and to the right the minting year. Penelope Delta was a pioneer of children's literature in Greece. Generations of Greek children have been raised with her books, which remain popular. The coin's outer ring depicts the 12 stars of the European flag.
	Monaco	500 years of the contract with Charles V	15,000 coins	17 June 2024
The design shows the effigy of Charles V. At the top, in semi-circle, is the name of the issuing country 'MONACO'. At the bottom is the inscription '1524 – TRAITE AVEC CHARLES QUINT (Treaty with Charles V) – 2024'. The coin's outer ring depicts the 12 stars of the European flag.
	Greece	50th anniversary of the restoration of democracy	750,000 coins	17 June 2024
The design features the Hellenic Parliament building, surrounded by the wording '50 ΧΡΟΝΙΑ ΑΠΟ ΤΗ ΜΕΤΑΠΟΛΙΤΕΥΣΗ' ('50 YEARS FROM THE RESTORATION OF DEMOCRACY IN GREECE') and 'ΕΛΛΗΝΙΚΗ ΔΗΜΟΚΡΑΤΙΑ' ('HELLENIC REPUBLIC'). Below is inscribed a palmette (mintmark of the Greek Mint). The fall of the colonels' junta on 24 July 1974 marked the restoration of democracy in Greece following a seven-year dictatorship. The coin's outer ring depicts the 12 stars of the European flag.
	Croatia	Varaždin (Stari grad Varaždin – the Old Town of Varaždin); First of the Croatian Cities series	200,000 coins	2 July 2024
The design features the keep of the Varaždin Castle (12th – 16th century). Varaždin is first mentioned in 1181. Having suffered massive casualties in the Tatar invasion of 1242, it was built as a royal fortress, which would become known as the Old Town. Its appearance has changed through the centuries: from a strong medieval fortress surrounded by water-filled moats to the main fortress and armoury of Slavonian Military Border and Varaždin military headquarters and a beautiful Renaissance castle. At present, the Old Town is the most important and magnificent historical building of the City of Varaždin, a highest-category monument of the Croatian architectural heritage. The coin also features the name of the issuing country 'HRVATSKA' (Croatia), the year of issuance '2024', and the words 'STARI GRAD VARAŽDIN' (the Old Town of Varaždin), which are all inscribed circularly at the top and the bottom of the design. The coin's outer ring depicts the 12 stars of the European flag.
	Vatican City	750th anniversary of the death of Thomas Aquinas	77,900 coins	3 July 2024
The design features St. Thomas Aquinas in the foreground in the vestments of the Dominican Order to which he belonged. In his left hand he holds a volume of his most important work, the Summa Theologiae, and in the other a pen. A shining sun stands out on the saint's chest, a symbol of his great wisdom. Among the various titles he received, he is most widely known as the "Angelic Doctor", which is quoted below and which glorifies his exceptional purity of soul and body. In the background on the left is the lily, a symbol of chastity, and the Church of St. Thomas of Roccasecca, the first religious building in the world built in honor of St. Thomas Aquinas, declared a saint on 18 July 1323, by Pope John XXII. At the top is the inscription "CITTÀ DEL VATICANO". At the left is the year "1274" and at the right the year "2024" and underneath it are the mintmark "R" and the name of the artist "A. CICCONI". The coin's outer ring depicts the 12 stars of the European flag.
	Portugal	Dedicated to the Olympic Team of Portugal Paris 2024	520,000 coins	4 July 2024
The design shows a set of elements arranged in the shape of a heart, representing a collective hug; around the heart there are 15 circles in symbolic reference to the Olympic rings and to the continents they represent, the tip of the heart shape is surmounted by the coat of arms of Portugal; the centre of the 'hug' holds the logo of the Portuguese Olympic Committee, conveying the idea that the hearts of the Portuguese will collectively beat for the Portuguese Olympic team at the Paris 2024 Olympic Games. Below the heart shape, the caption 'Equipa Olímpica Portugal', and the year '2024'; on the left the mintmark 'Casa da Moeda'; and on the right the name of the designer. The coin's outer ring depicts the 12 stars of the European flag.
	Malta	The Cittadella; First of the Maltese Walled Cities series	80,000 coins	26 August 2024
The design was created by Noel Galea Bason and depicts the walled city known locally as 'Iċ-Ċittadella' (The Citadel) on the island of Gozo, which is the second largest island forming the Maltese archipelago. In their present form, the fortifications encircling the 'Ċittadella' were built and modified by the Order of St John. The design shows a depiction of the city with its fortified walls. At the bottom left is the inscription of the issuing country 'MALTA' and at the bottom right is the year of issuance '2024'. At the top is the inscription 'ĊITTADELLA' and underneath is the inscription 'GOZO'. This coin is intended to be part of a series dedicated to Maltese walled cities e.g. Mdina and Valletta which are an intrinsic part of Maltese and European cultural heritage. The coin's outer ring depicts the 12 stars of the European flag.
	Malta	Maltese honey bee First of the Maltese Native Species series	80,000 coins	26 August 2024
The design was created by Maria Anna Frisone and depicts the Maltese honey bee (Apis Mellifera Ruttneri) which is one of the endemic species of flora and fauna found on the Maltese islands. The design shows a rendition of the bee with a flower and a honeycomb filling up the background. The coin raises awareness of one of Malta's endemic species and encapsulates the work of the bee which pollinates flowers and makes honey. At the left side is the inscription of the issuing country 'MALTA' and at the right side the year of issuance '2024'. The coin's outer ring depicts the 12 stars of the European flag.
	Finland	Finnish Architecture	400,000 coins	30 August 2024
The design shows the silhouettes of four buildings. The roof towers of the buildings point towards the centre. The texts 'GESELLIUS', 'LINDGREN', 'SAARINEN' and the indication of the issuing country 'FI', the mintmark and the year '2024' run diagonally between the buildings. The texts and the silhouettes of the buildings form a clock-like composition on the circular image surface of the coin. The coin's outer ring depicts the 12 stars of the European flag.
	San Marino	530th anniversary of the death of Domenico Ghirlandaio	59,000 coins	5 September 2024
In the centre is the Virgin in prayer, a detail of the painting 'Adoration of the Shepherds' by Domenico Ghirlandaio, kept in the Sassetti Chapel of Santa Trinità (Florence). On the left are the inscription 'SAN MARINO' and the letter 'R', the identifier of the Mint of Rome; on the right, the inscription 'GHIRLANDAIO' and the dates '1494' and '2024'; at the bottom, the initials of the artist, Valerio de Seta ('VdS'). The coin's outer ring depicts the 12 stars of the European flag.
	Slovakia	100 years of Košice Peace Marathon	1,000,000 coins	19 September 2024
The design depicts, on the left side, a marathon runner and, on the right side, a detail of St Elizabeth's Cathedral, one of the architectural landmarks of Košice. Inscribed across the lower part of the design are the name of the issuing country 'SLOVENSKO' and, below it, the marathon's inaugural year '1924' and the coin's year of issuance '2024'. The inscription 'KOŠICKÝ MARATÓN' runs along the edge of the upper half of the design. Next to the lower left edge is the mint mark of the Kremnica Mint (Mincovňa Kremnica), consisting of the letters 'MK' placed between two dies. To the right of it are the stylised initials 'LR', referring to the national side's designer Roman Lugár. The coin's outer ring depicts the 12 stars of the European flag.
	Lithuania	Straw gardens in Lithuania	500,000 coins	25 September 2024
The design features a stylised straw garden consisting of geometric shapes of varying sizes, one tip of which is pointed upwards (to the sky) and the other downwards (to the underground). The design also bears the inscription "LIETUVA" (LITHUANIA), the year of issue (2024) and the mintmark of the Lithuanian Mint. Straw gardens are a Baltic cultural tradition that carries decorative and ceremonial significance and is related to well-being and spirituality. The national side of the coin is designed by Tomas Dragūnas. The coin's outer ring depicts the 12 stars of the European flag.
	Croatia	Marko Marulić	200,000 coins	15 October 2024
In recognition of this significant milestone, the Government of the Republic of Croatia has proclaimed 2024 as the Year of Marko Marulić. The central motif of the national side of the coin is the portrait of Marko Marulić (1450–1524), Croatian writer. Marko Marulić (Marul) was born in Split in 1450 and is a prominent representative of European Christian humanism and Renaissance epics. His literary works, mostly written in Latin, consist of works in verse and prose, his literary models being the Bible, the Church Fathers' philosophy and classical antiquity. He wrote the epic poem Judita, his magnum opus, in Croatian. It is the first artistic epic in Croatian literature composed in the Croatian language to contain the underlying poetics of Virgil and the Biblical epics. In it, Marulić achieved a true Renaissance synthesis of Croatian, Latin and Italian literary tradition, thus creating a masterpiece. Completed in 1501, it was first published twenty years later. The coin also features the inscriptions of the two-letter issuing country code "HR" (Croatia), the year of issuance "2024." and the words "MARKO MARULIĆ", which are all inscribed circularly along the edge of the coin's core. The coin's outer ring depicts the 12 stars of the European flag.
	Latvia	Himmeli	413,000 coins	21 November 2024
Himmeli is an ancient Latvian Christmas decoration. The design shows the traditional module shape the decoration is made up: the octahedron which consists of 12 interconnected straws and it symbolises the year with its 12 months. The himmeli is one of the oldest Christmas decorations, being in use long before the Christmas tree. At the bottom left is inscribed the name of the country of issuance "LATVIJA". At the bottom right is inscribed the year of issuance "2024". The coin's outer ring depicts the 12 stars of the European flag.
	Cyprus	Twenty years of EU accession	7,000 coins	27 November 2024
The design depicts Cyprus as a power of creation and development within the European environment, symbolized by the building of the European Commission in Brussels. The globe of the Earth is also shown, symbolizing the geopolitical importance of Cyprus and its contribution to peace and wellbeing of nations. The issuing country's name "ΚΥΠΡΟΣ – KIBRIS" and the dates "2004–2024" are inscribed at the bottom of the design. Additionally, the phrase "20 ΧΡΌΝΙΑ ΑΠΌ ΤΗΝ ΈΝΤΑΞΗ ΤΗΣ ΚΎΠΡΟΥ ΣΤΗΝ ΕΥΡΩΠΑΪΚΉ ΈΝΩΣΗ" (i.e. 20 years since the accession of Cyprus to the European Union) is inscribed in circle around the design. The coin's outer ring depicts the 12 stars of the European flag.
	Andorra	100 years of skiing in Andorra	60,000 coins	9 December 2024
It is considered that the first contacts of the Andorran population with skiing took place in 1924. Nowadays, skiing is the country's king of sports making Andorra a very popular destination thanks to its snow-capped mountains, spectacular landscapes and world-class ski resorts. The design of the coin commemorates the centenary of the practice of this sport in Andorra and reproduces the lower part of the silhouette of a skier together with the name of the issuing country 'ANDORRA' and the year of issue '2024'. The coin's outer ring depicts the 12 stars of the European flag.
	Andorra	UCI Mountain Bike MTB World Championships	60,000 coins	9 December 2024
This year, Andorra will host an important international sporting event: the UCI Mountain Bike World Championships 2024. The design of the coin shows a rider passing through a landscape showing the spectacular nature of this sport, with the inscription 'CAMPIONATS DEL MÓN UCI DE BTT' (UCI Mountain Bike World Championships 2024). The inscriptions of the issuing country 'ANDORRA' and the year of issuance '2024' have been reproduced at the sides of the rider, as if they were another element of this sport. The coin's outer ring depicts the 12 stars of the European flag.
	Slovenia	250 years of the National and University Library of Slovenia	1 million coins	18 December 2024
Slightly tilted National and University Library's doorhandle with Pegasus, a winged divine stallion, used as a symbolic guide for library's visitors to the world of knowledge by the architect Jože Plečnik, is displayed on the coin. Doorhandle is the first contact with the institution that invites us to the world of knowledge and inspiration. At the top, in semi-circle, is the inscription "NARODNA IN UNIVERZITETNA KNJIŽNICA". At the bottom are the name of the country of issuance "SLOVENIJA" and the year of issuance "2024". The coin's outer ring depicts the 12 stars of the European flag.
	Vatican City	150th birthday of Guglielmo Marconi	77,900 coins	24 July 2025
The design features Marconi's portrait at the center, the portraits of Pope Pius XI at the right, and future Pius XII at the left. At the top right, in semi-circle, is the inscription 'GUGLIELMO MARCONI' and underneath it the dates '1874' and '2024'. At the bottom is the inscription 'CITTÀ DEL VATICANO' followed by the name of the artist 'L. PANCOTTO' (Loredana Pancotto). At the left is the mintmark 'R'. The coin's outer ring depicts the 12 stars of the European flag.

=== 2025 coinage ===
Image	Country	Feature	Volume	Date
	Germany	The Great Bend in the Saar at Mettlach; Third of the Bundesländer II series	30 million coins	16 January 2025
The design shows the Saarschleife bend in the Saar river, reduced to the key features of the motif of the meandering river, which characterises the hilly landscape. Groups of trees depicted along the course of the river symbolise the forested landscape around the picturesque Saarschleife. The bird's-eye perspective means that the landmark natural waterway is seen embedded in the surrounding hills, which reach off into the distance. The inscription "Saarland" is positioned low down in the foreground, in order to not disturb the landscape's sense of calmness and light. The upper half of the coin's inner circle also features on the left the mark of the artist, Frankfurt-based Carsten Wolff, and on the right the letter "X" as placeholder for the mint mark of the respective mint ("A", "D", "F", "G" or "J"). The lower half features the inscription "SAARLAND", Germany's issuing country code "D" and the year of issue, "2025". The coin's outer ring depicts the 12 stars of the European flag.
	Slovakia	100 years since the Ice hockey European Championships in High Tatras	1 million coins	20 January 2025
The design depicts an ice hockey player in action, wearing a style of uniform typical of the period of the 1925 Ice Hockey European Championship. The player is set against a stylised panorama of the High Tatras, the Slovak mountain region where the championship took place. The inscription 'MAJSTROVSTVÁ EURÓPY V HOKEJI' (European championship in hockey) runs along the edge of the upper half of the coin's inner circle. The years '1925' and '2025' appear in the upper left part of the design, one above the other. At the bottom is the name of the issuing country 'SLOVENSKO'. To the right of the figure is the mint mark of Slovakia's Kremnica Mint (Mincovňa Kremnica), the producer of the coin. Next to it are the initials 'KL' of the designer, Karol Ličko. The coin's outer ring depicts the 12 stars of the European flag.
	Belgium	National Lottery	120,000 coins	23 January 2025
The design depicts in the centre the classical allegorical representation of good fortune, the goddess Fortuna, carrying the horn of plenty. On the right and below are 4 depictions of a four-leaf clover, another universal symbol of luck. Behind the image of Fortuna, the current National Lottery logo is visible. On the left side of the coin the text "loterie nationale loterij" is displayed. On the bottom left the country code BE and the year of issue 2025 are shown. At the bottom right, the initials of designer Iris Bruijns are visible. As the Royal Dutch Mint will strike the coins, the mintmark of Utrecht, a mercury staff, is located underneath the year mark, together with the Belgian mint director mintmark, an aster flower in front of an Erlenmeyer flask. The coin's outer ring depicts the 12 stars of the European flag.
	Estonia	500 years of Estonian written language	1 million coins	30 January 2025
The centre of the coin presents a composition of books forming the capital letter "E", as these books symbolise the tradition of the Estonian written language; the text "EESTI RAAMAT 500", which means "500 years of books in Estonian"; and the year 1525, which is the date of the first publication of a book in Estonian. The design also shows the year of issue “2025”. The coin's outer ring depicts the 12 stars of the European flag.
	Italy	Jubilee Holy Year 2025	3 million coins	5 February 2025
The design shows, in the centre, a depiction of the Holy Door located in the Basilica of Saint Peter. At the top, in semi-circle, the inscription "IUBILAEUM", while at the bottom, always in semi-circle, closing the Latin inscription, a series of alternating empty and full fish, symbol of Christianity. On the left "2025", year of the coin issuance and "R", identifying the Mint of Rome; on the right "RI", acronym of the Italian Republic and, "C.M." author's initials (Claudia Momoni). The coin's outer ring depicts the 12 stars of the European flag.
	Spain	Old City of Salamanca; Sixteenth of the UNESCO World Heritage Sites series	2 million coins	10 March 2025
The design shows a view of the "Convento de San Esteban". At the bottom, the legend ESPANA and the year of issue 2025. At the top, in capital letters, the word SALAMANCA and the mint mark "Eme Coronada". The coin's outer ring depicts the 12 stars of the European flag.
	France	Louvre Museum	300,000 coins	18 March 2025
The design shows the facade of the Louvre on the east side, mixed with the iconic plan of the Museum's maze of extraordinary rooms. In the background, the pyramidion and the structure of the great pyramid illustrate the traditional and contemporary character of the Louvre. The year of issuance ""2025" and the indication of the country "RF", as well as the mintmarks are inserted on the museum's plan. The coin's outer ring depicts the 12 stars of the European flag.
	San Marino	Jubilee Holy Year 2025 – Pilgrims of hope	56,000 coins	27 March 2025
The design depicts in the centre a woman with an anchor, an allegory of Hope, while she takes a child by the hand, a symbol of humanity. On the left is the inscription "SAN MARINO", four square sails, the letter "R", identifying the Mint of Rome, and the initials of the author "DI MAULO" (Gabriele Di Maulo); at the top right an eight-pointed star, the inscription "IUBILAEUM 2025" and at the bottom the initials of the engraver "M.B.INC" (Marta Bonifacio). The coin's outer ring depicts the 12 stars of the European flag.
	Lithuania	Defense of Lithuania	500,000 coins	27 March 2025
The design features the contours of Lithuania. The state borders are surrounded by a stylised spine barrier, symbolising the concept of holistic and whole-of-society defence. The image of the hedgehog also represents the openness and fragility of free societies, which must be defended, to the utmost, against external threats. Lithuania is presented as a hedgehog that remains at the ready to defend itself always. The centre of the design bears the inscription "LIETUVA" (LITHUANIA), the year of issue "2025", and the mintmark of the Lithuanian Mint. The coin's outer ring depicts the 12 stars of the European flag.
	Luxembourg	25th anniversary of Grand Duke Henri's accession to the throne	136,000 coins	5 May 2025
The design depicts in its centre the effigy of Grand Duke Henri and in the background the grand ducal Palace. The text "25. TROUNJUBILAUM VUM GROUSSHERZOG HENRI" is depicted in semi-circular form above the effigy. The indication of the issuing country "LETZEBUERG" as well as the year of issuance "2025" appear below the effigy. The coin's outer ring depicts the 12 stars of the European flag.
	Luxembourg	75th anniversary of the Schuman Declaration	136,000 coins	5 May 2025
The design depicts at the bottom a hand holding a pencil writing on a piece of paper. The upper part of the pencil ends up in an olive branch, continuing with doves, both being symbols of peace. The doves fly to the horizon showing six stars, representing the six Member States signing later the Treaty establishing the European Coal and Steel Community, for which the Schuman declaration set the basis. The upper part of the design shows the text "DECLARATION SCHUMAN" as well as its date " 09.05.1950 ". Below the number "75" represents the indication of the anniversary of the declaration. The name of the issuing country "LUXEMBOURG" as well as the year of issuance "2025" appear at the right of the design. The monogramme (letter "H" with a crown) is a representation of Grand Duke Henri. The coin's outer ring depicts the 12 stars of the European flag.
	Italy	World voyage of the Amerigo Vespucci sail training ship 2023–2025	3 million coins	9 May 2025
The design shows, in the center, a depiction of the Amerigo Vespucci Training Ship which, at full sail, plows the sea waves. In arch on the left, the writing 'Amerigo Vespucci Tour Mondiale 2023–2025'; below on the left, '2025', year of the coin issuance and 'RI', acronym of the Italian Republic; on the right, 'R', identifying the Mint of Rome; in exergue 'E.FERRETTI', signature of the designer. The coin's outer ring depicts the 12 stars of the European flag.
	Finland	Finnish state visits – diplomacy and foreign policy	200,000 coins	13 May 2025
The design features an abstract door symbolizing state visits, with a mirror-finish rectangular shape. The mintmark, the year 2025, and the lettering "FI" are positioned vertically along the left edge of the rectangle. The rectangle has a rounded top that follows the edge of the coin. Below and to the right, the surface is grooved with horizontal lines, while a circular shape intersects the curve of the image area. The coin's outer ring depicts the 12 stars of the European flag.
	Malta	Maltese Ox; Second of the Maltese Native Species series	140,000 coins	15 May 2025
The design shows a rendition of the Maltese ox. The coin raises awareness of one of Malta's indigenous breeds which is endangered. At the top, in semi-circle, is the inscription "IL-GENDUS MALTI". At the bottom is the name of the issuing country "MALTA" and underneath is the year of issuance "2025". At the bottom right are the initials of the designer "MAF" (Maria Anna Frisone). The coin's outer ring depicts the 12 stars of the European flag.
	Malta	City walls of Mdina; Second of the Maltese Walled Cities series	150,000 coins	15 May 2025
This coin is intended as part of a series dedicated to Maltese walled cities, which are an intrinsic part of Maltese and European cultural heritage. It follows on the coin issued in 2024 depicting "Iċ-Ċittadella" (The Citadel) of Gozo. The design depicts Mdina surmounted by its cathedral church. At the top left is the inscription "MDINA". At the top right are the initial of the designer, "NGB" (Noel Galea Bason). At the bottom the name of the issuing country "MALTA" and underneath is the year of issuance "2025". The coin's outer ring depicts the 12 stars of the European flag.
	Monaco	Carladès county	15,000 coins	16 June 2025
The coin commemorates the title of Count of Carladès, attributed, by historical tradition, to the second in the line of succession and which today belongs to Princess Gabriella. The design shows the facade of the hotel that belonged to the Grimaldi family until the Revolution. At the top is the name of the issuing country "MONACO." At the bottom, in semi-circle, is the inscription "COMTE DE CARLADES." The coin's outer ring depicts the 12 stars of the European flag.
	Portugal	World Scouting and Youth Movements	515,000 coins	25 June 2025
The coin honours World Scouting and youth movements that promote cultural exchange, mutual understanding, and friendship, since in 2025, the 16th World Scout Moot will be held in Portugal, bringing together scouts aged 18 to 25 from around the world to learn from one another and develop new skills. The design shows a fleur-de-lis, the most universal symbol of Scouting. Surrounding this central motif are several inscriptions: above, the phrase "Sempre alerta. Sempre pronto" —the two Portuguese translations of Baden-Powell's motto 'Be Prepared,' used by the two major Scouting organizations in Portugal; to the left, the name of the designer; below, the era and issuing country, "Portugal"; and to the right, the national coat of arms of Portugal, followed by the mintmark "Casa da Moeda". The coin's outer ring depicts the 12 stars of the European flag.
	San Marino	550th anniversary of the birth of Michelangelo	52,000 coins	3 July 2025
The design depicts in the centre Cleopatra, detail of the drawing by Michelangelo Buonarroti, preserved at the Casa Buonarroti Foundation (Florence). At the left is the inscription "MICHELANGELO" in semi-circle, the letter R, identifying the Mint of Rome and the year "1475", and at the right the name of issuing country "SAN MARINO" in semi-circle, the year "2025". At the bottom are the initials of the author "SP" (Silvia Petrassi). The coin's outer ring depicts the 12 stars of the European flag.
	Belgium	F1 Circuit of Spa-Francorchamps	155,000 coins	25 July 2025
The design depicts in the centre the current track layout of the racing circuit in SpaFrancorchamps. On the left side of the coin, the total distance (in meters) of the circuit, ‘7.004 M’, is displayed and below it also the year of the establishment of the circuit, ‘1921’, is shown. Above the depiction of the track layout, the text ‘CIRCUIT DE SPA FRANCORCHAMPS’ is displayed. On the bottom of the coin, the country code ‘BE’ and the year of issue ‘2025’ are shown, accompanied by the Belgian mint director mintmark, an aster flower in front of an Erlenmeyer flask, and the mintmark of Utrecht, a mercury staff (as the Royal Dutch Mint will strike the coins). At the right side of the coin, the initials ‘IB’ of designer Iris Bruijns are visible. The coin's outer ring depicts the 12 stars of the European flag.
	Finland	100 years of the Finland-Sweden Athletics International	200,000 coins	12 August 2025
The design features two legs in motion and arching, dashed lines representing a running track. The design commemorates the 100th anniversary of the Finland–Sweden Athletics International, celebrating both Finnish sporting tradition and the event's collective spirit. At the top, the year “2025” is displayed horizontally. The mintmark appears on the centre left of the image area, and the lettering “FI” is on the centre right. The coin's outer ring depicts the 12 stars of the European flag.
	Croatia	1,100th anniversary of the Croatian Kingdom and the coronation of King Tomislav	400,000 coins	14 August 2025
The central motif of the design is King Tomislav on horseback. The other motif is Croatia's distinctive and recognisable symbol, the Croatian checkerboard, which represents part of the coat of arms of the Republic of Croatia. The design also features the following inscriptions: the words "KRALJ TOMISLAV" (King Tomislav), the year of the coronation of King Tomislav "925.", the issuing country "REPUBLIKA HRVATSKA" (Republic of Croatia) and the year of coin issuance "2025.", which are all inscribed circularly along the edge of the coin's core. The coin's outer ring depicts the 12 stars of the European flag.
	Greece	100th anniversary of the birth of Mikis Theodorakis	750,000 coins	10 September 2025
The design depicts the composer Mikis Theodorakis. The theme is bordered by the inscriptions “100 ΧΡΟΝΙΑ ΑΠΟ ΤΗ ΓΕΝΝΗΣΗ ΤΟΥ ΜΙΚΗ ΘΕΟΔΩΡΑΚΗ” ("100 YEARS FROM THE BIRTH OF MIKIS THEODORAKIS") and “ΕΛΛΗΝΙΚΗ ΔΗΜΟΚΡΑΤΙΑ” (“HELLENIC REPUBLIC”); below is the minting year, to the right a palmette (mintmark of the Greek Mint) and to the left the treble clef and staff. The coin's outer ring depicts the 12 stars of the European flag.
	|Greece	200th anniversary of the death of Laskarina Bouboulina	750,000 coins	10 September 2025
The design features a portrait of Laskarina Bouboulina, with background a stylized mast and rigging. The theme is bordered by the wording “200 ΧΡΟΝΙΑ ΑΠΟ ΤΟΝ ΘΑΝΑΤΟ ΤΗΣ ΛΑΣΚΑΡΙΝΑΣ ΜΠΟΥΜΠΟΥΛΙΝΑΣ” (“200 YEARS FROM THE DEATH OF LASKARINA BOUBOULINA"') and “ΕΛΛΗΝΙΚΗ ΔΗΜΟΚΡΑΤΙΑ” (“HELLENIC REPUBLIC”). To the left are a palmette (mintmark of the Greek Mint) and the minting year. The coin's outer ring depicts the 12 stars of the European flag.
	Portugal	Sustainable development	500,000 coins	15 September 2025
The design shows a representation of planet Earth that is surrounded by the legend "Desenvolvimento Sustentável (Sustainable Development)"; on the left and upper edges, a branch-like row of 17 sets of leaves arranged in a triangle suggesting the universal recycling symbol, in a reference to the 17 Goals of the 2030 Agenda for Sustainable Development; on the lower and right edges the legend «Portugal», the national coat of arms of Portugal, the era, and the mintmark "Casa da Moeda" above the name of the designer. The coin's outer ring depicts the 12 stars of the European flag.
	Germany	35 years of German unity First of the Unity, Justice and Freedom series	30 million coins	25 September 2025
: The national side features a typographic design: the right-aligned words ‘Wir sind ein Volk’ (‘We are one people’) are positioned, one on top of the other, to the left of a slightly off-centre vertical axis. The words ‘35 Jahre Deutsche Einheit’ (‘35 years of German unity’) are left-aligned on the right-hand side. The two blocks of text are offset slightly along the vertical axis and are bordered by horizontal lines at the top and bottom. The two texts are connected by a slightly enlarged ‘D’ in the middle. The upper part of the coin's inner circle also features the initials of the artist, Hattingen-based Thomas Serres (‘TS’), and beneath the initials the mint mark of the respective mint (‘A’, ‘D’, ‘F’, ‘G’ or ‘J’). At the bottom of the coin's inner ring is the year of issue ‘2025’ and above it Germany's issuing country code ‘D’. The coin's outer ring depicts the 12 stars of the European flag.
	Latvia	Sēlija; Fifth of the Latvian Historical Regions series	400,000 coins	24 October 2025
The design bears a depiction of the coat of arms of the country's historical and cultural region Sēlija. At the top is inscribed the name of the country of issuance ‘LATVIJA’. At the bottom is the inscription ‘SĒLIJA’ and at the right is the year of issuance ‘2025’. The coin's outer ring depicts the 12 stars of the European flag.
	France	Notre-Dame de Paris	20 million coins	28 October 2025
The design represents in its centre, the facade of Notre-Dame de Paris seen from the forecourt. The rose window is inserted in the background of the spire. The year “2025” and the mention “RF” are inserted on the left side accompanied by Monnaie de Paris’ mintmark. The name "NOTRE-DAME DE PARIS" is inserted on the right side accompanied by the General Engraver's mintmark. The coin's outer ring depicts the 12 stars of the European flag.
	Monaco	Marquisate of Baux	15,000 coins	4 November 2025
The coin commemorates the fiefdom of Marquisate of Baux. This title was first held in 1642 by Hercule Grimaldi, son of Honoré II. Today, by historical tradition, it belongs to HSH Hereditary Prince Jacques. The design depicts the rock and the surrounding area of the village of Les Baux de Provence. At the top is the name of the issuing country "MONACO." At the bottom, in semi-circle is the inscription "MARQUISAT DES BAUX." The coin's outer ring depicts the 12 stars of the European flag.
	Andorra	Bearded vulture	60,000 coins	24 November 2025
The design of the coin shows a close-up of a bearded vulture (Gypaetus barbatos), a bird species threatened with extinction, with the inscription “ANDORRA” and the year of issue “2025”. The coin's outer ring depicts the 12 stars of the European flag.
	Andorra	Small states games	60,000 coins	24 November 2025
The design of the coin reproduces some of the different sporting disciplines of this competition together with the inscriptions “JOCS DELS PETITS ESTATS D’EUROPA” (Games of the Small States of Europe) and “ANDORRA 2025”. The coin's outer ring depicts the 12 stars of the European flag.
	Slovenia	100th anniversary of the birth of Miki Muster	990,000 coins	26 November 2025
Three heroes of Miki Muster's comic books are displayed on the coin using soft relief technique, i.e. Zvitorepec, Lakotnik and Trdonja. Below them are the mintage year “2025” and the issuing country “SLOVENIJA”. On the upper left side are the year of birth “1925” and the name “MIKI” while on the upper right side is the surname “MUSTER”. The coin's outer ring depicts the 12 stars of the European flag.
	Croatia	Pula (Grad Pula – Arena); Second of the Croatian Cities series	200,000 coins	1 December 2025
The central motif on the design is the Pula's Arena (the amphitheatre), one among the most prominent ancient monuments in the Republic of Croatia, shown from the view of the Adriatic Sea depicted below the central motif to highlight the distinctly Mediterranean attribute of Croatia. On the right side of the Arena there is an image of the church of St. Anthony built in the 1930s, which is part of the panoramic view of the City of Pula. The coin also features the inscriptions of the issuing country "HRVATSKA" (Croatia), the year of issuance "2025." and the words "GRAD PULA-ARENA" (City of Pula-Arena), which are all inscribed circularly along the edge of the coin's core. The coin's outer ring depicts the 12 stars of the European flag.
	Lithuania	Lithuania Minor; Fifth of the Lithuanian Ethnographical Regions series	990,000 coins	22 December 2025
The design features the contours of Lithuania. The state borders are surrounded by a stylised spine barrier, symbolising the concept of holistic and whole-of-society defence. The image of the hedgehog also represents the openness and fragility of free societies, which must be defended, to the utmost, against external threats. Lithuania is presented as a hedgehog that remains at the ready to defend itself always. The centre of the design bears the inscription “LIETUVA” (LITHUANIA), the year of issue “2025”, and the mintmark of the Lithuanian Mint. The coin's outer ring depicts the 12 stars of the European flag.
	Vatican City	Sede vacante 2025	76,000 coins	9 March 2026
The design depicts the coat of arms of the Cardinal Camerlengo positioned beneath the symbol of the Apostolic Chamber, represented by two crossed keys surmounted by a pavilion. The inscriptions "CITTA' DEL VATICANO", "SEDE VACANTE" and "MMXXV", indicating the year of issue, are engraved along the coin's edge. An abstract representation of a dove appears between the inscriptions "CITTA' DEL VATICANO" and "SEDE VACANTE". The letter "R", identifying the Rome Mint, is placed below the Camerlengo's coat of arms, flanked by the name of the coin's engraver on the left, and the name of the coin's designer on the right ("O. ROSSI" for Orietta Rossi). The coin's outer ring depicts the 12 stars of the European flag.
	Vatican City	Jubilee Holy Year 2025	91,000 coins	12 March 2026
The design depicts the opening of the Holy Door at St. Peter's Basilica. To the right, vertically, the Latin inscription "IVBILAEUM" and "2025," indicating the year mark. At the bottom, in an arc, the inscription "CITTA' DEL VATICANO", indicating the issuing State. The letter "R", identifying the Rome Mint, appears on the door; at the bottom left of the image, the inscription "D. LONGO" features the name of the coin's designer (Daniela Longo). The coin's outer ring depicts the 12 stars of the European flag.
	Vatican City	550th anniversary of the birth of Michelangelo	80,000 coins	12 March 2026
The design features the Dome of St. Peter's Basilica, designed by Michelangelo, who worked on it until his death in 1564. Below, a section of the vault of the Sistine Chapel, apportioned and frescoed by Michelangelo. On the left, vertically, appear Michelangelo's autograph signature "michelagniolo", the letter "R" identifying the Rome Mint, and the name of the coin 's designer "D. LONGO" (Daniela Longo). The inscription "CITTA' DEL VATICANO", indicating the issuing State, is arranged in an arc above the Dome. Just below, the years "1475", Michelangelo's birth year, and "2025", the year of issuance are inscribed. The coin's outer ring depicts the 12 stars of the European flag.

=== 2026 coinage ===
Image	Country	Feature	Volume	Date
	Germany	150th anniversary of the birth of Konrad Adenauer; Second of the Unity, Justice and Freedom series	30 million coins	8 January 2026
	Slovakia	Trenčín, European Capital of Culture 2026	995,000 coins	13 January 2026
	Germany	Museum of Climatic Zones in Bremerhaven (Bremen); Fourth of the Bundesländer II series	30 million coins	29 January 2026
	France	Antoine de Saint-Exupéry	75,000 coins	29 January 2026
	Lithuania	Lithuania's energy independence	495,000 coins	18 March 2026
	Italy	Pinocchio - 200th birthday of Carlo Collodi	3,250,000 coins	30 March 2026
	Italy	800th anniversary of the death of Francis of Assisi	3,250,000 coins	30 March 2026
	Spain	Monastery of Poblet; Seventeenth of the UNESCO World Heritage Sites series	1,500,000 coins	30 March 2026
	Spain	Protection, Rights and Inclusion	1,500,000 coins	30 March 2026
	San Marino	450th Anniversary of the Death of Titian	52,000 coins	31 March 2026
	Malta	Maltese Walled Cities: Valetta	30,000 coins	31 March 2026
	Malta	The Pharaoh's Hound (Native Species Series)	30,000 coins	31 March 2026
	Cyprus	Presidency of the Council of the European Union	250,000 coins	20 May 2026
	Finland	Finnish Broadcasting Company(Yleisradio) 100 years	204,000 coins	21 May 2026
	Estonia	Sipsik	1 million coins	5 June 2026
	Belgium	100 years of the National Railway Company of Belgium (NMBS/SNCB)	157,000 coins	15 June 2026
	Greece	100th Anniversary of the Founding of the Academy of Athens	750,000 coins	15 June 2026
	Slovakia	50th anniversary of the Czechoslovak football team's victory at the 1976 European Championship	1 million coins	15 June 2026
	Monaco	Duchy of Valentinois	15,000 coins	16 June 2026
	Slovenia	150th birthday of Ivan Cankar	1 million coins	17 June 2026
	France	The French Navy - 400 years of experience	20 million coins	30 June 2026
	Ireland	Presidency of the Council of the European Union	500,000 coins	6 July 2026
	Luxembourg	40th anniversary of the awarding of the International Charlemagne Prize to the people of Luxembourg	120,000 coins	15 July 2026
	Luxembourg	Luxembourg National Day – Grand Ducal Birthday	120,000 coins	15 July 2026
	Portugal	100 Years of Rotary Club Portugal	500,000 coins	15 July 2026
	Croatia	100 years of Croatian Radiotelevision	200,000 coins	20 July 2026
The national side of the commemorative coin features a depiction of radio waves in five rows, symbolizing the beginning of the broadcasting of Radio Zagreb, which was first heard on a wavelength of 350 meters medium wave on 15 May 1926 at 8:30 p.m. That moment also symbolizes the beginning of the operation of Croatian Radiotelevision, the legal successor of Radio Zagreb. The coin also bears the following inscriptions: the year of issue "2026", the text "100 YEARS OF CROATIAN RADIOTELEVIZIJE" and the designation for the Republic of Croatia "HR". All of them are inscribed within the rows of radio waves and typographically blend with them. The combination of the depicted radio waves and the surface of the coin's core also represents the recognizable Croatian symbol "Croatian checkerboard", one of the elements of the coat of arms of the Republic of Croatia. Part of the artistic design of the national side of the commemorative coin is the author's mark, the stylized initials "KG". The outer ring of the national side of the commemorative coin features the 12 stars of the European flag.
	Finland	Raila and Reima Pietilä	75,000 coins	25 August 2026
	Greece	200th Anniversary of the Exodus of Messolonghi	750,000 coins	15 September 2026
	Belgium	50 Years of the National Geographic Institute and 200 Years of the Royal Observatory of Belgium	125,000 coins	25 September 2026
	Ireland	U2: 50th anniversary	150,000 coins	25 September 2026
	Lithuania	The city of Kaunas	495,000 coins	1 October 2026
	San Marino	800th Anniversary of the Death of Francis of Assisi	52,000 coins	6 October 2026
	Portugal	70 Years of the Calouste Gulbenkian Foundation	100,000 coins	7 October 2026
