= Lefkos Middleton =

British-Cypriot neurologist and academic

Lefkos T. Middleton
- Born: Cyprus
- Education: Université Louis Pasteur (Strasbourg)
- Known for: Founding the Cyprus Institute of Neurology and Genetics
- Scientific career
- Fields: Neurology, Neuroepidemiology
- Workplaces: Imperial College London

Lefkos T. Middleton is a Cypriot neurologist and academic. He is Professor of Neurology at Imperial College London and has worked in clinical neuroscience, neuroepidemiology, and ageing research.

He is the founder of The Cyprus Institute of Neurology and Genetics (CING), which was established in the early 1990s and became a major centre for neurological and genetic research in Cyprus.

== Education ==
Middleton studied medicine and specialised in neurology at the Université Louis Pasteur in Strasbourg, France, where he completed his medical training and postgraduate studies in neurology.

== Career ==
In 1990, Middleton founded the Cyprus Institute of Neurology and Genetics following the award of international funding, serving as its first chairman during its formative years.

After leaving the institute in the late 1990s, he continued his academic and clinical career in the United Kingdom. He joined Imperial College London, where he holds a professorship in neurology and is involved in research on neurological disorders and ageing.

In parallel with his academic work, Middleton has practised as a consultant neurologist within the National Health Service in the United Kingdom.

== See also ==
- The Cyprus Institute of Neurology and Genetics
