= The Cyprus Institute of Neurology and Genetics =

Cypriot research institute

- Formation: 1990
- Founder: Dr. Lefkos T. Middleton
- Type: Research institute
- Legal status: Non-profit
- Headquarters: Nicosia, Cyprus
- Location: Nicosia, Cyprus
- CEO and Medical Director: Leonidas A. Phylactou
- Parent organization: Cyprus Foundation for Muscular Dystrophy Research
- Website: www.cing.ac.cy

The Cyprus Institute of Neurology and Genetics (CING) is a non-profit medical, research, and academic institution founded in 1990 in Nicosia, Cyprus. It focuses on clinical neurology, molecular biology, and human genetics.

== History ==
The institute was founded in 1990 under the auspices of the Cyprus Foundation for Muscular Dystrophy Research. Its establishment was led by neurologist Lefkos Middleton, who served as the institute’s first director until 1999.

CING initially operated in temporary facilities at Makarios III Hospital in Nicosia, occupying approximately 300 m² with a staff of around 20. In 1995, the institute moved to purpose-built premises to expand its clinical, laboratory, and research work.

Since its establishment, CING has been supported partly through annual funding from the Government of Cyprus in exchange for specialised clinical and diagnostic services provided to the national health system. Additional funding has been secured through competitive national and European research grants, philanthropic donations, and international collaborations.

== Activities ==
The institute provides specialised medical services in neurology, clinical genetics, and related diagnostic fields. It conducts basic and applied biomedical research and participates in regional and international research collaborations.

=== Academic programmes ===
Since 2012, CING has offered postgraduate programmes including MSc and PhD degrees, delivered through its affiliated academic school in collaboration with the University of Cyprus and other partners.

== See also ==
- Cyprus Neuroscience and Technology Institute
- The Cyprus Institute
