= Jules Gabriel Levasseur =

French engraver

Jules Gabriel Levasseur (6 November 1823 - 25 September 1907) was a French engraver, focussing on engravings of paintings and genre scenes.

== Life ==
Born in the former 1st arrondissement of Paris, he was a son of Joséphine Justine Renard and her husband Pierre Levasseur, making him part of a family of watchmakers.

He joined Alexis-François Girard's studio in 1838 to learn drawing and mezzotint engraving, a technique which he did not try From 1842 onwards he studied at Paris' École des beaux-arts, ending his time there in the class of Louis-Pierre Henriquel-Dupont. He became friends with Gustave Bertinot and competed for the prix de Rome.

He was a faithful but untalented imitator of engravers in the classical tradition. From 1855 onwards he exhibited at the Paris Salon, where he won honourable mentions in 1859 and 1863, two second class medals in 1877 and one first class medal in 1878. He also won one medal each at the World's Fairs in 1873 and 1878.

He contributed illustrations to the complete works of Alfred de Musset published by Charpentier in 1878 after drawings by Alexandre Bida, as well as to a book of offices published by Marius Michel (1846-1925). He seems to have been active until 1898 and died at home at 33 rue d'Assas in the 6th arrondissement of Paris. His widow Alina Ganning was aged 74 at the time of his death.

== Selected works on steel plate or copperplate ==
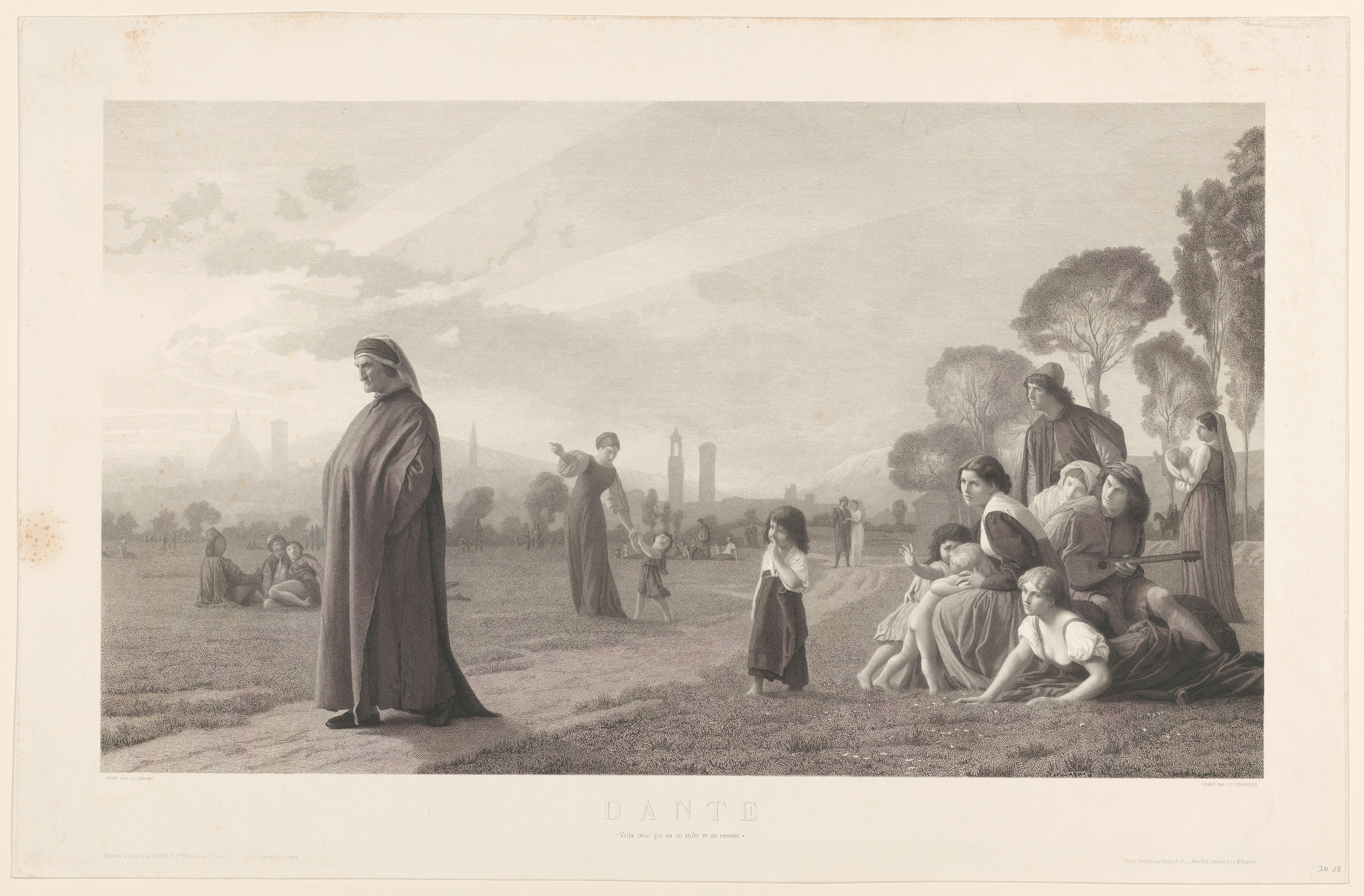
Dante, after J.L. Gérôme

- My Sister Isn't Here, after Jean-Louis Hamon (1856),
- Woman Gardening,
- Woman Farming,
- Aurora, after Jean-Louis Hamon,
- Paul Delaroche, after Eugène-Ferdinand Buttura (1853),
- Dante, after Jean-Léon Gérôme,
- Jacob and Rachel and Ruth and Naomi, after Ary Scheffer (1859),
- The Infanta Isabella, after Antony van Dyck,
- The Cervarolles, after Ernest Hébert for the chalcography of the Louvre,
- Adoration of the Magi, after Bernardino Luini,
- The Rapture of Saint Paul, after Nicolas Poussin, for the Société française de gravure,
- Hippolyte Rigaud and Doctor Demarquay, after Alexandre Cabanel,
- Youth and Love, after William Bouguereau,
- The First Funeral, after Félix-Joseph Barrias (1880),
- Dutch Interior, after Pieter de Hooch (1881),
- Madonna with Saints known as the Carrondelet Madonna, after Fra Bartolomeo (1886),
- Racine and Chapelle, after Robert Tournières (1887),
- Christ at Gethsemane, after Paul Delaroche (1888),
- Calling in the Gleaners, after Jules Breton (1889),
- Oath of the Horatii, after Jacques-Louis David (1892).

== Bibliography ==
- (in French) Gustave Vapereau, Dictionnaire universel des contemporains : contenant toutes les personnes notables de la France et des pays étrangers, Paris, Louis Hachette, 1893, page 991
