= Goupil & Cie =

International auction house

- Formerly: Maison Goupil (prior to 1850); Goupil, Vibert et cie (New York, 1848)
- Founded: 1850
- Founder: Jean-Baptiste Adolphe Goupil
- Headquarters: Paris, France, Paris, France
- Number of locations: Worldwide (1)
- Area served: Worldwide
- Products: Fine art reproductions (paintings, sculptures, prints), original paintings and drawings, contemporary art, luxury products
- Services: Art dealing, art publishing, auctions
- Divisions: Les Ateliers Photographiques (Asnières)

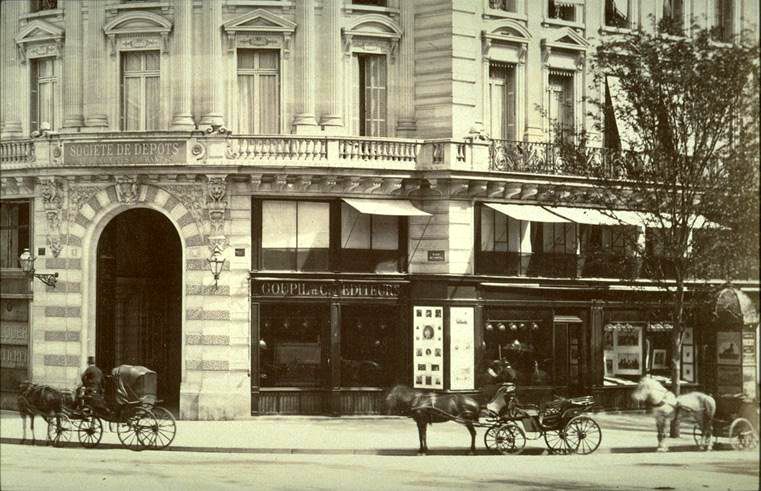
Galerie Goupil, place de l'Opéra Paris.

Goupil & Cie is an international auction house and merchant of contemporary art and collectibles. Jean-Baptiste Adolphe Goupil founded Goupil & Cie in 1850. Goupil & Cie became a leading art dealership in 19th-century France, with its headquarters in Paris. Step by step, Goupil established a worldwide trade in fine art reproductions of paintings and sculptures, with a network of branches and agents in London and other major art capitals across Continental Europe as well as in New York City and Australia. Les Ateliers Photographiques, their workshop north of Paris, in Asnières, was instrumental in their expansion from 1869. The leading figure of Goupil & Cie was Jean-Baptiste Adolphe Goupil (1806–1893). His daughter Marie married the French artist Jean-Léon Gérôme.

== History ==
=== Jean-Baptiste Adolphe Goupil ===
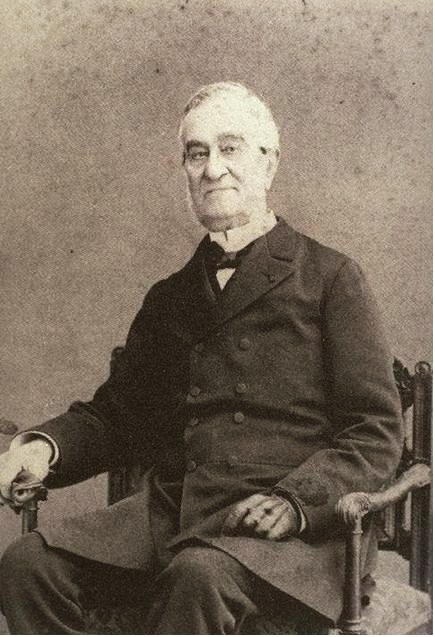
Jean-Baptiste Adolphe Goupil (1806–1893)

Jean-Baptiste Adolphe Goupil was born on March 7, 1806 in Paris. He was the son of Auguste Goupil, pharmacist, and Anne Lutton (1774–1849) and ancestor of Hubert Drouais. He became a leader of the art and publishing industry and one of the most important art dealers and publishers of the 19th century. From 1827, Jean-Baptiste Adolphe Goupil engaged in the business of printing and publishing original prints and interpretation in several countries, most importantly in France, England and Germany. He married Victoire Brincard (1808–1886), originally from Belfort, in August 1829, and had five children: Léon, Amélie, Albert, Marie and Blanche. After the death of his first partner, Henry Rittner in 1840, Goupil found a new partner Théodore Vibert (1816–1850) the following year in 1841. Between 1845 and 1848, Goupil and Vibert opened a branch in London and then in New York at 289 Broadway. Vibert died in 1850, leaving several children that Jean-Baptiste Adolphe Goupil took care of. In addition to a printer-publisher, Goupil also became a dealer in paintings and drawings. Goupil signed a contract in 1845 with the painter Charles Landelle, who undertook not to dispose of his reproduction rights before having offered it to Maison Goupil. Jean-Baptiste Adolphe Goupil founded the international company Goupil & Cie in 1850, which in a few decades became one of the greatest art dealers of the 19th century. Jean-Baptiste Adolphe Goupil was elected mayor of Saint-Martin-aux-Chartrains (Calvados) from 1875 to 1893 where he owned the "castle of the whole city". He was appointed officer of the Legion of Honor in 1877. Having already lost his eldest son in 1855, Jean-Baptiste Adolphe Goupil decided to gradually retire from business from 1884, when his second son Albert died. Jean-Baptiste Adolphe Goupil died on May 9, 1893, in Saint-Martin-aux-Chartrains.

=== Origins ===
The seascape painter, Charles Louis Mozin, introduced Rittner to the young Jean-Baptiste Adolphe Goupil, who descended from a celebrated family of painters, the Drouais. Together, they created the maison Goupil in 1829. The business premise was printing and selling prints (engravings and lithographs) in Blvd. Montmartre in Paris. From the outset, the house specialised in the sale of engravings after pictures by Ingres, Hippolyte Delaroche and Léopold Robert. After Rittner's death, Goupil formed a partnership with Théodore Vibert, which was formalized in Paris in 1842. In a ground-breaking move, the firm opened in New York in 1848 as Goupil, Vibert et cie. William Schaus became the first director of the New York branch, but was replaced by Adolphe Goupil's son, Léon, and then in 1855 by Michel Knoedler, who eventually bought out Goupil's interest in 1857.

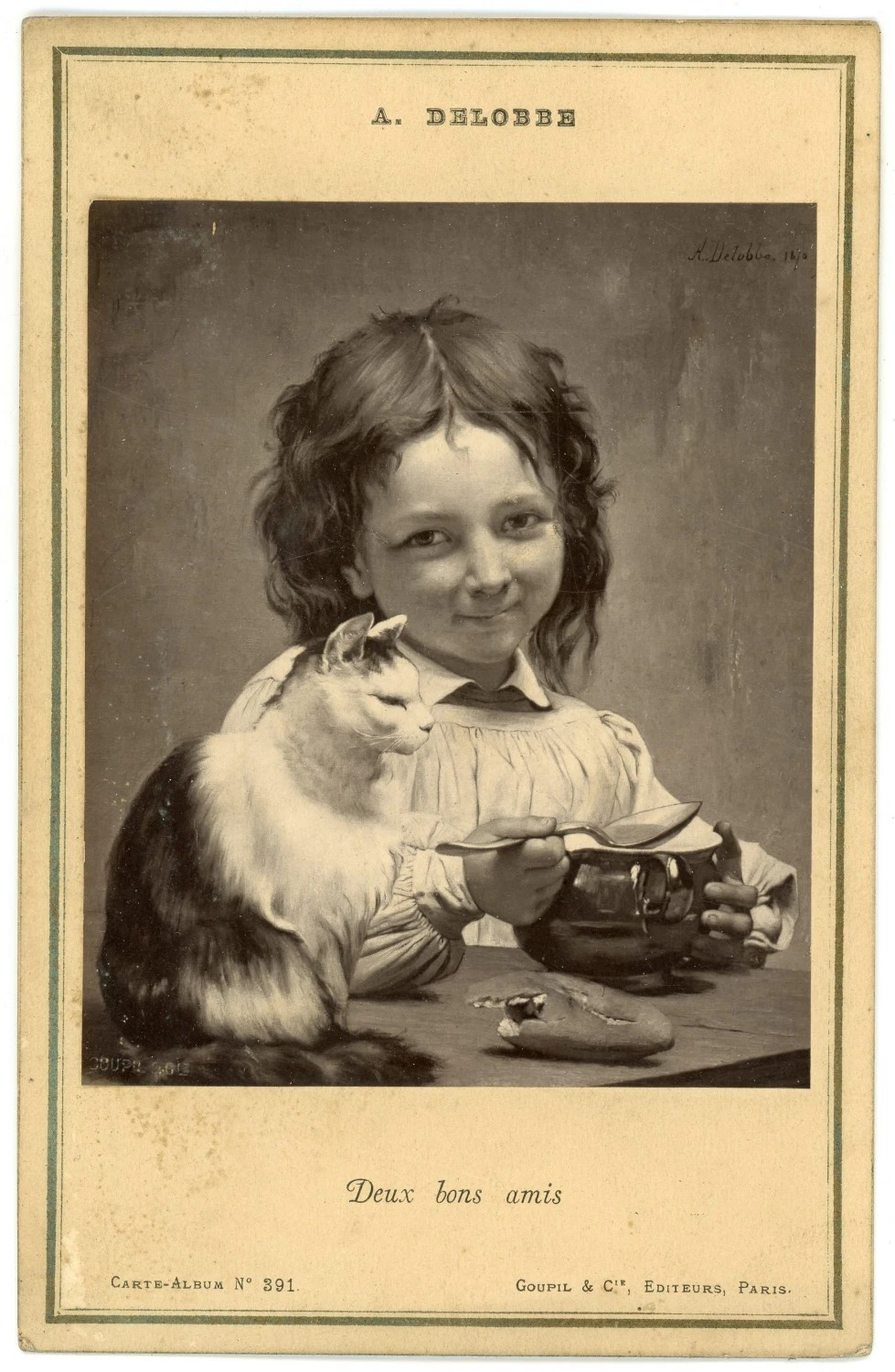
A Delobbe, Deux bons amis, Carte Album n^{o} 391

Adolphe Goupil formed Goupil & Cie in 1850. Over the next 34 years the partners were Adolphe Goupil 1850–84, Alfred Mainguet 1850–56, Léon Goupil 1854–55, Léon Boussod 1856–84, Vincent van Gogh 1861–72, Albert Goupil 1872–84, René Valadon 1878–84. Until 1861 the firm concentrated on buying, selling and editing prints. To feed an emerging middle-class market with inexpensive art, Goupil's workshop outside Paris employed skilled craftsmen to produce engraved, etched, photographic and even sculptural copies of paintings in vast quantities. Goupil's reproductions made Jean-Léon Gérôme, in particular, a well known artist. Maison Goupil also promoted via their print reproductions, a significant number of works by Italian painters who worked for the publishing house during the 1870s, including paintings by Alberto Pasini and Francesco Paolo Michetti among others. When Vincent van Gogh (1820–1888), the uncle of painter Vincent van Gogh, known as Uncle Cent by Vincent and his brother Theo, entered the firm, the business expanded to paintings and drawings, finally in 1872 to industrial images, including photographic and héliographic procedures.

Uncle Cent moved to Paris in 1858 and took residence at 9 Rue Chaptal, which housed Goupil's headquarters, too. In 1861, he became partner of Goupil & Cie. As Uncle Cent had no children, his nephews were evidently supposed to follow him up in the firm: Vincent entered in 1869, Theo in 1873. When Vincent was sacked by Léon Boussod in 1876, the balance between the shareholders suffered – and so Theo got his chance. Called to the Paris office for the time of the World Fair 1878, he was offered to stay in Paris. Between 1881 and 1890, Theo was manager of Goupil & Cie's branch on Boulevard Montmartre, from which he sold about 1,000 paintings, including works by members of the Barbizon School like Corot and Daubigny.

In these years, Vincent took up his vocation and began to study art, based on the Cours de dessin, compiled by Charles Bargue "in collaboration with J.-L. Gérôme" and edited by Goupil & Cie, 1868–1873. In 1880, he asked his former director Herman Gijsbert Tersteeg, at Goupil's in The Hague, to lend him a copy, which he finally received with the support of his brother Theo.

Vincent van Gogh fell ill and retired in 1872 due to his degrading health, to settle in Princenhage for the summers and in Menton for the winters, but remained a partner until 1878. His duties were taken over by René Valadon. From then on, the firm was completely in the hands of the Goupil family and their sons-in-law Léon Boussod and René Valadon. Adolphe Goupil (1840–1884) joined his father in 1877. In 1867 Albert had taken over the business oo Vincent van Gogh (uncle Cent). Both families have been associates to manage the Dutch branch. Vincent and Théodore van Gogh were also employed in London and Paris.

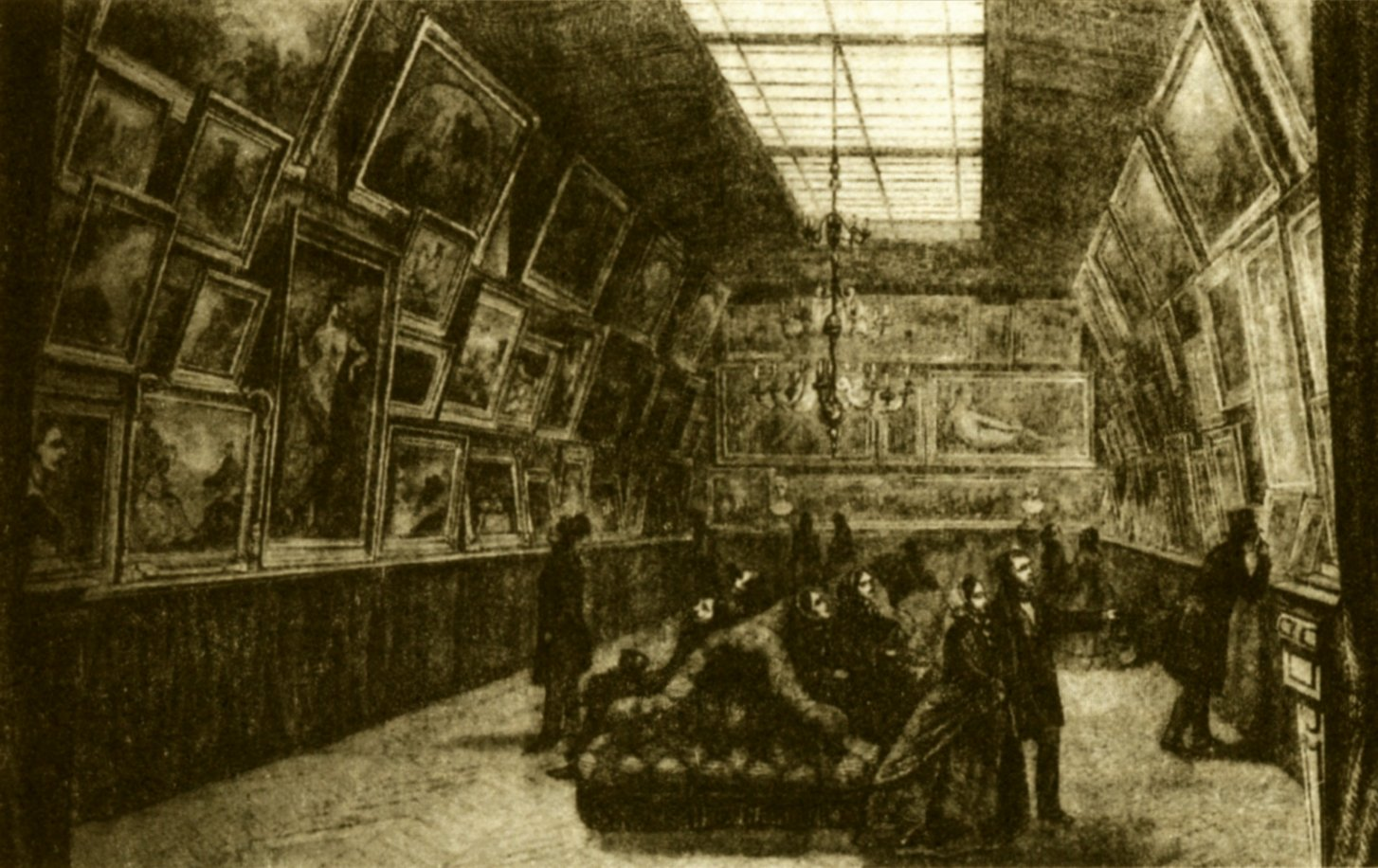
Goupil & Cie, rue Chaptal (c.1860)

=== Global presence in the 19th and 20th centuries ===
- Paris

9 Rue Chaptal (Administration, gallery of paintings and storerooms)

- Paris

19 Boulevard Montmartre
It was in Boulevard Montmartre (originally nos 12 and 15) that Adolphe Goupil first went into business. No. 19 became a simple sales room when the administration was moved to Rue Chaptal. From 1881 this branch was run by Theo van Gogh.

- Paris

2 Place de l'Opéra
Goupil's main sales room established in 1870

- New York

289 Broadway
Established in 1848.

- The Hague

Plaats 14, since 1861 and moved in 1880 to Plaats 20
Established in the 1830s by Vincent van Gogh on Spuistraat, the gallery was transferred to Plaats 14, in 1861, when combined with Goupil

- Brussels

58 Rue Montagne de la Cour / Hofberg 58
Established in 1865 by H. W. van Gogh; after his retirement this branch was run by V. Schmidt.

- London

Established by Ernest Gambart. 17 Southampton Street. Moved to 25 Bedford Street, Strand in 1875 when Goupil & Cie took over Holloway & Sons and their salerooms. Goupil's manager in London was at this time Charles Obach.

- Berlin

Charlottenstrasse 63

== Goupil & Cie in the 21st century ==
Today, Goupil & Cie specializes in modern and contemporary art as well as luxury and exceptional products. Sales and auctions are mainly organized online.

== See also ==
- Vincent van Gogh chronology
