= Noël Valois =

French historian

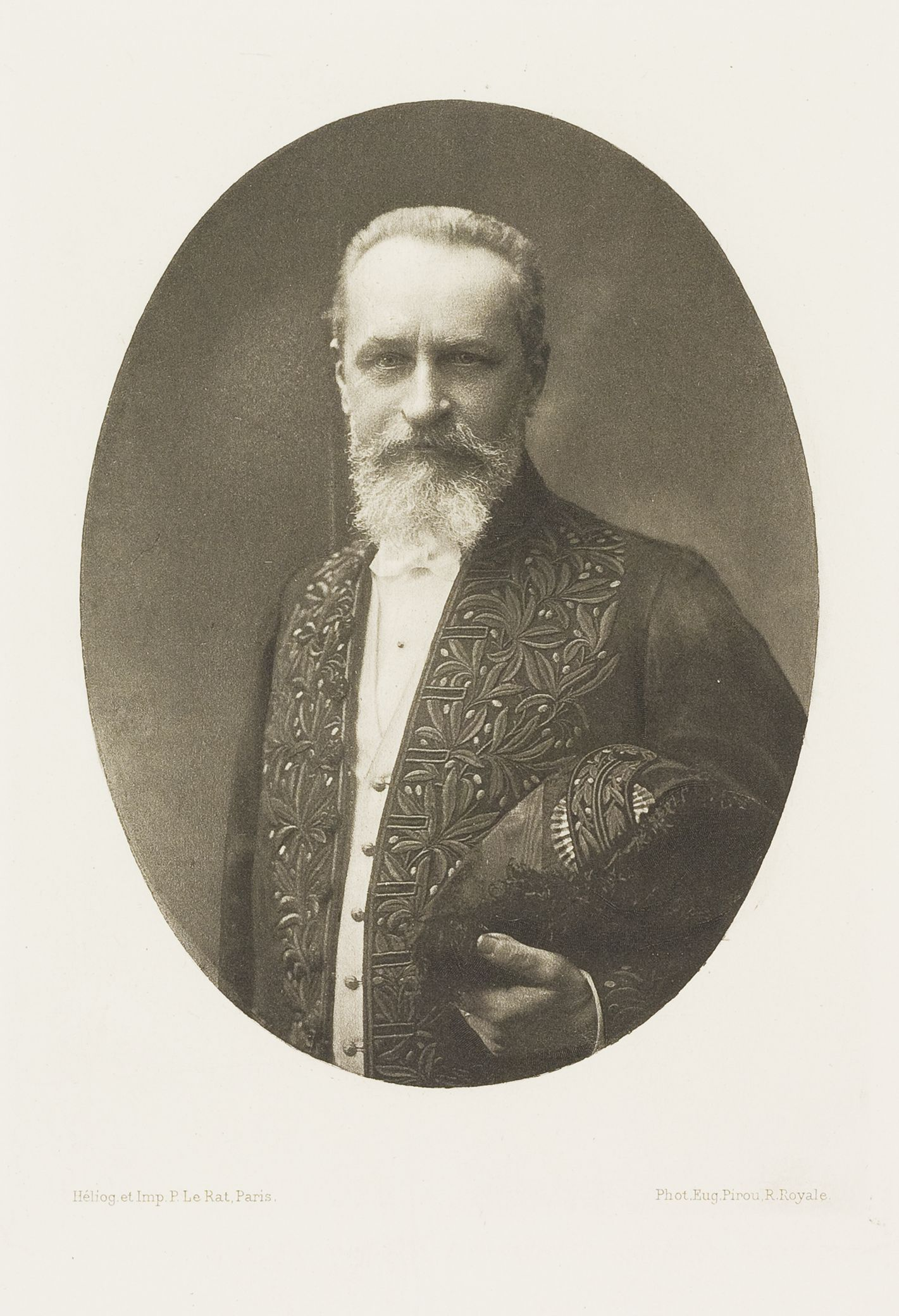
Noël Valois

Noël Valois (French pronunciation: [nɔɛl valwa]; 4 May 1855, Paris – 11 November 1915, Paris), was a French historian.

The grandson of sculptor Achille Valois, Valois studied at the Lycée Louis-le-Grand. He then entered the École Nationale des Chartes in 1875, where he presented his thesis on William of Auvergne in 1879. He then joined the National Archives in 1881.

The Académie des Inscriptions et Belles-Lettres awarded him with the prix Gobert for the publication of his work on the Council of State under Henry IV in 1889. On 28 October 1893, he resigned from his post at the Archives National to devote himself to his research. Specializing in the study of the Western Schism, historians realized thanks to him that the period of the papacy in the 14th century could be only studied by comparing the Avignon records with those of the Vatican.

Valois was elected to the Académie des Inscriptions et Belles-Lettres on 23 May 1902, succeeding Jules Girard. He went on to chair the Académie and the Institut de France in 1913. He was a corresponding member of the academies of Bologna and Munich.

== Works ==
- Guillaume d'Auvergne, évêque de Paris, 1228-1249 : sa vie et ses ouvrages, 1880.
- Étude sur le rythme des bulles pontificales, 1881.
- Cartulaires de l'abbaye de Notre-Dame-des-Prés de Douai, 1881.
- "La Revanche des frères Braque : notes sur la révolution parisienne de 1356-58", Mémoires de la Société de l'histoire de Paris et de l'Île-de-France, 1883.
- Inventaire des arrêts du Conseil d'État (règne de Henri IV), 1886-1893.
- Le Gouvernement représentatif en France au XIV^{e} siècle, 1885.
- Étude sur le Conseil du Roi pendant la captivité de Jean le Bon, 1885.
- Le Conseil de raison de 1597, 1885.
- Étude historique sur le Conseil du Roi, 1886.
- Le Privilège de Châlo-Saint-Mars, 1887, online
- Le Rôle de Charles V au début du Grand Schisme (1378), Paris, 1887.
- Le Conseil du roi aux XIV^{e}, XV^{e} et XVI^{e} siècles, Paris, 1888.
- "Raymond de Turenne et les papes d'Avignon (1386–1408)", Annales du Bulletin de la Société d'Histoire de France, 1889.
- L'élection d'Urbain VI et les origines du Grand Schisme d'Occident, 1890.
- Louis I^{er}, duc d'Anjou et le Grand Schisme d'Occident (1378-1380), 1892.
- Une ambassade allemande à Paris en 1381, 1892.
- "Le Projet de mariage entre Louis de France et Catherine de Hongrie et le voyage de l'empereur Charles IV à Paris", Bulletin de la Société d'Histoire de France, 1893.
- "La Situation de l'Église au mois d'octobre 1378", Mélanges Julien Havet, 1895.
- Un poème de circonstance composé par un clerc de l'Université de Paris (1381), 1895.
- La France et le Grand Schisme d'Occident, T. I et II, Paris, 1896-1901.
- La prolongation du Grand Schisme d'Occident au XV^{e} siècle dans le midi de la France, pp. 163-175., 1899.
- "Jeanne d'Arc et la prophétie de Marie Robine", Mélanges offerts à P. Fabre, 1902.
- Histoire de la pragmatique sanction de Bourges sous Charles VII, 1906.
- "Un nouveau témoignage sur Jeanne d'Arc", Bulletin de la Société de l'Histoire de France, 1907.
- La Crise religieuse du XV^{e} siècle : Le pape et le concile (1418-1450), 1909.
- Encyclopædia Britannica (XI^{e} édition), 1911. "Basel, Confession of," "Benedict XIII. (anti-pope)," etc.
- Le Procès de Gilles de Rais, 1913.
- Vassy, 1914.
