= Alexis-François Girard =

French engraver

- Born: 8 December 1787
- Died: 17 January 1870 (aged 82)
- Spouse: Louise Marthelot (m.1820)
- Children: Jules Girard

Alexis-François Girard (8 December 1787 (Note: Inscribed on his tombstone) - 17 January 1870) was a French engraver. He was also notable as the father of Jules Girard (1825-1902), Hellenist and member of the Institut de France.

== Life ==
According to his death registration he was born in Vincennes but no other evidence backs this. He also does not feature in the reconstituted birth records for Paris. According to Henri Beraldi, François was the son of Romain Girard, another engraver, who was one of those who worked on a set of illustrations after Nicolas Lavreince for an edition of Liaisons dangereuses (1785). Trained by his father, François engraved in his workshop, notably a series of large head studies after famous paintings of his time, all signed "R. Girard et F. Girard" or "Girard et Girard fils". Father and son lived at 29 rue Barthélémy around 1795-1800, next door to the Palais de Justice, at one end of the Pont au Change.

He was admitted to the Beaux-Arts de Paris in Jean-Baptiste Regnault's class, but abandoned painting.

In Paris on 11 July 1820 Girard married Louise Marthelot (1784-1861)

Gustave Bertinot, Octave Tassaert, Élise Prétot (1831-1899 (Note: She won several medals at the Paris Salon between 1864 and 1870.)), Jules Gabriel Levasseur and Girard's own wife all also trained under Girard. From 1835 to 1865 his prints were published by the maison Goupil. He was made a knight of the Legion of Honour on 14 August 1866.

=== Selected works ===
- Young Tobias and Female Saint (1818), lithographs published by Bonnemaison, after Bralle (drawing) and Raphael, Montauban, musée Ingres.
- Bellegarde (1819), engraving after Louis-Édouard Rioult (drawing) and Gérard, Pau, musée national du château de Pau.
- The Soldier's Widow (1824), lithograph published by chez Chardon, after Ary Scheffer, Vendôme, musée de Vendôme.
- Henri IV [portrait] (1827), stipple engraving after Rioult (drawing) and Gérard, Pau, musée national du château de Pau.
- Study for the head of Cérès, after Prud'hon, engraving on paper, Gray, musée Baron-Martin.
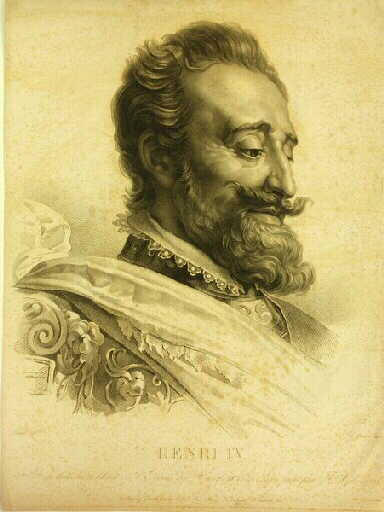
Portrait of Henri IV (1827), intaglio after a drawing by Louis-Édouard Rioult and a painting by Gérard (musée national du château de Pau)

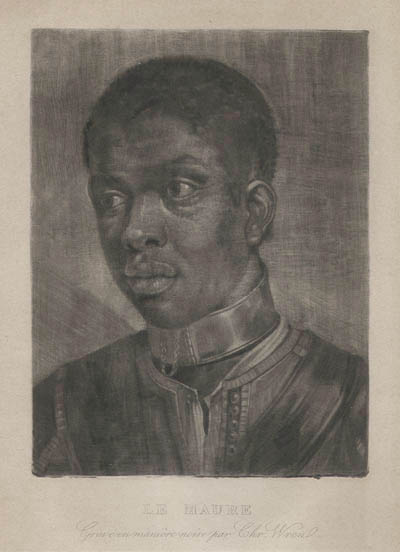
The Moor (1839), mezzotint after Christopher Wren

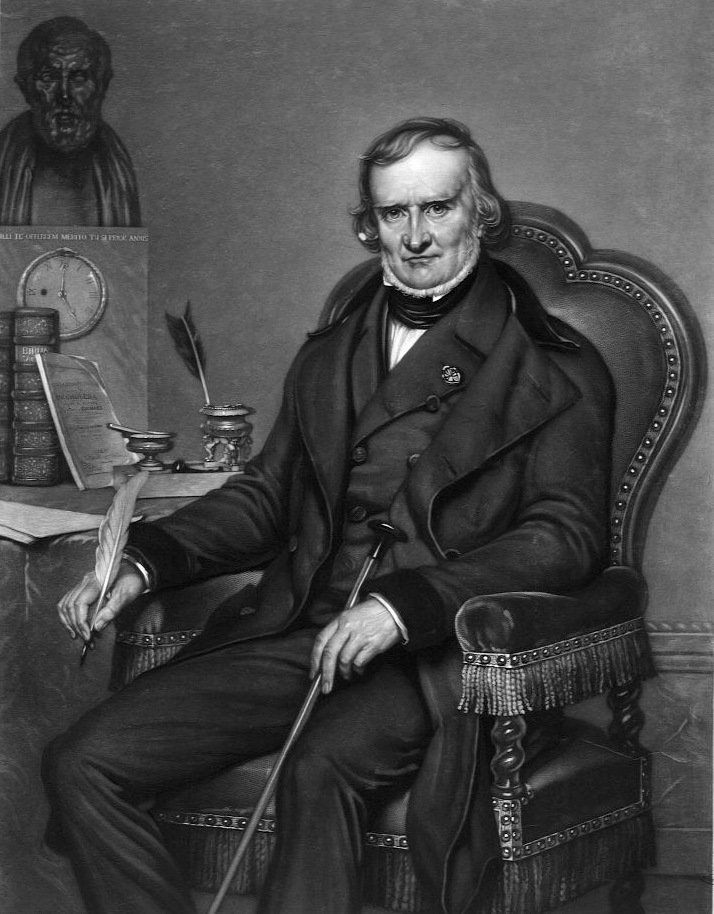
Joseph Récamier, mezzotint after Paulin Guérin

== Bibliography (in French) ==
- Henri Beraldi (1888). Les graveurs du 19th century : guide de l'amateur d'estampes modernes. Paris: L. Conquet. pp. 145–149..
