= French euro coins =

Designs of French currency

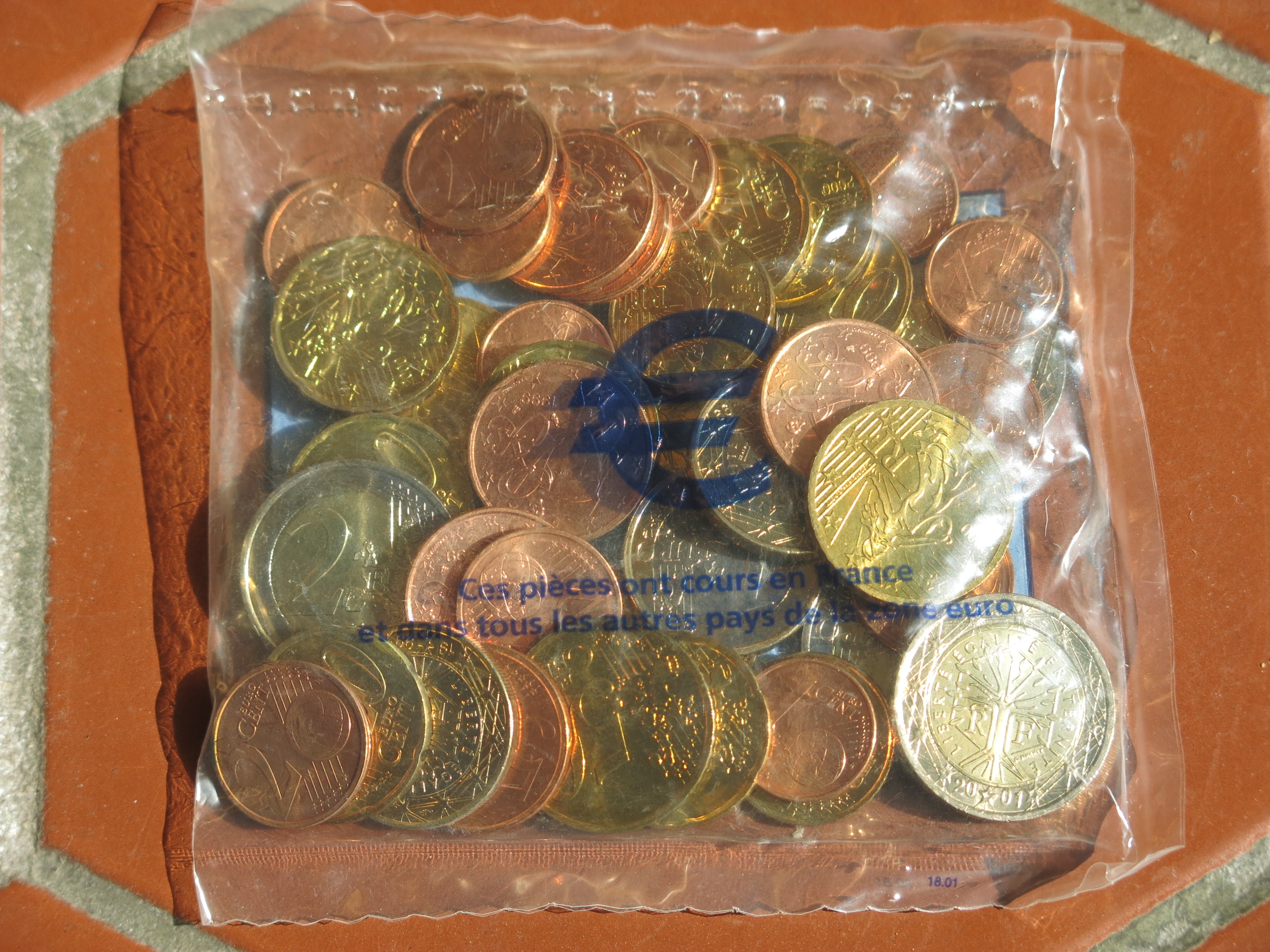
French euro starter kit

French euro coins feature three separate designs for the three series of coins. The minor series was designed by Fabienne Courtiade, the middle one by Laurent Jurio and the major two coins are by Joaquin Jimenez. All designs share the 12 stars of the EU and the year of imprint as well as the letters "RF" for République Française (French Republic).

== French euro design ==
For images of the common side and a detailed description of the coins, see euro coins.

The first sets of euro coins were minted in 1999 and the euro was put into circulation in the eurozone in 2002. Like Belgium, Finland, the Netherlands and Spain, the first euro coins of France are marked 1999, not 2002.

To coincide with the French Presidency of the Council of the European Union, and the 20th anniversary of euro coins, the French national designs on the 1 and 2 euro coins have been changed. The new designs were approved by the Council of the European Union on 26 July 2021 and have been revealed to the public on 16 December 2021 ahead of their entry into circulation in 2022.

In 2024, new designs for the 10-, 20-, and 50-cent coins will be introduced, featuring Simone Veil on the 10-cent, Josephine Baker on the 20-cent, and Marie Curie on the 50-cent coin.

Depiction of French euro coinage | Obverse side
€0.01	€0.02	€0.05
Link to file	Link to file	Link to file
Portrait of Marianne, the symbol of the first French Republic.
€0.10	€0.20	€0.50
Link to file	Link to file	Link to file
1999–2023: La Semeuse, a theme maintained from the former franc. 2024–: La Semeuse; Simone Veil	1999–2023: La Semeuse, a theme maintained from the former franc. 2024–: La Semeuse; Josephine Baker	1999–2023: La Semeuse, a theme maintained from the former franc. 2024–: La Semeuse; Marie Curie
€1.00	€2.00	€2 Coin Edge
Link to file	Link to file	for a total of 12 stars
1999–2021: A stylised tree contained in a hexagon with the motto Liberté Egalité Fraternité. 2022–: The design features oak and olive branches that form the tree of life and symbolise strength, solidity and peace. The tree and the motto stand within a hexagon.		for a total of 12 stars

== Circulating mintage quantities ==
The following table shows the mintage quantity for all French euro coins, per denomination, per year.

Face Value	€0.01	€0.02	€0.05	€0.10	€0.20	€0.50	€1.00	€2.00
1999	794 066 000	702 119 000	616 242 000	447 299 600	454 341 200	105 803 600	301 100 000	56 745 000
2000	605 282 000	510 170 000	280 114 000	297 482 000	149 003 600	179 546 000	297 320 000	171 170 000
2001	300 696 580	249 125 580	217 339 477	144 528 261	256 357 108	276 302 274	150 266 624	237 965 793
2002	**296 743**	**186 743**	186 469 743	206 832 743	192 182 743	226 570 743	129 510 743	153 793 243
2003	160 164 339	160 209 339	101 124 339	180 864 339	**147 339**	**147 339**	**147 339**	**147 339**
2004	400 172 136	300 164 136	60 302 136	1 608 936	**140 136**	**140 136**	**140 136**	**140 136**
2005	240 289 670	260 270 670	20 257 670	43 660 520	**83 670**	**83 670**	**83 670**	**83 670**
2006	343 079 927	283 247 427	132 118 927	60 292 927	**69 927**	**69 927**	**69 927**	**69 927**
2007	320 209 050	220 417 050	130 129 050	90 162 850	40 224 650	**67 050**	**67 050**	**67 050**
2008	462 736 459	386 595 359	218 295 359	178 769 759	25 600 959	**63 359**	**63 359**	**63 359**
2009	436 386 600	343 176 600	184 766 600	142 766 600	82 716 600	**56 600**	**56 600**	**56 600**
2010	335 614 918	277 099 918	184 290 918	76 211 918	108 082 918	**58 918**	**58 918**	**57 418**
2011	320 165 137	250 175 137	144 947 137	99 925 137	54 983 137	**47 137**	**47 137**	36 071 137
2012	358 604 761	277 706 761	139 142 761	77 395 761	**38 761**	**38 761**	**38 761**	36 974 761
2013	282 995 135	220 679 135	147 203 135	139 815 135	27 083 135	**35 135**	**35 135**	17 366 635
2014	365 080 079	209 986 079	130 066 079	35 040 479	45 058 079	**34 079**	**34 079**	8 926 079
2015	287 315 500	199 295 500	97 055 500	71 025 500	27 755 500	**35 500**	**35 500**	13 035 000
2016	293 802 000	192 564 000	142 002 000	115 941 600	**36 000**	**36 000**	**36 000**	15 911 500
2017	270 038 000	199 998 000	129 863 000	90 050 000	13 024 800	**36 000**	**36 000**	30 005 500
2018	207 038 000	142 668 000	75 672 000	99 324 000	80 028 000	27 036 000	**36 000**	49 553 000
2019	176 787 000	161 305 000	105 955 000	77 036 000	60 850 600	17 785 000	**25 000**	36 475 000
2020	27 500	27 500	27 500	27 500	27 500	27 500	27 500	24 500
2021	27 500	27 500	27 500	27 500	27 500	27 500	39 522	39 522
2022	39 500	39 500	39 500	39 500	39 500	39 500	51 522	51 522
2023	35 000	35 000	35 000	35 000	35 000	35 000	35 000	35 000
2024	25 000	25 000	25 000	25 000	25 000	25 000	25 000	24 500
**Bold** - Small quantities minted for sets only.

== €2 commemorative coins ==
Year	Subject	Volume

=== 2024 Summer Olympics series ===
Year	Number	Design	Volume
2021	1	Racing Marianne; Eiffel Tower	
2022	2	Génie de la Liberté throwing discus; Arc de Triomphe	
2023	3	La Semeuse practicing pugilism; Pont-Neuf	
2024	4	Hercules practicing antique wrestling with Notre-Dame's Chimera; Notre-Dame	

== See also ==
- Adoption of the euro in France
