= Gustave Delacroix de Ravignan =

French Jesuit preacher and author

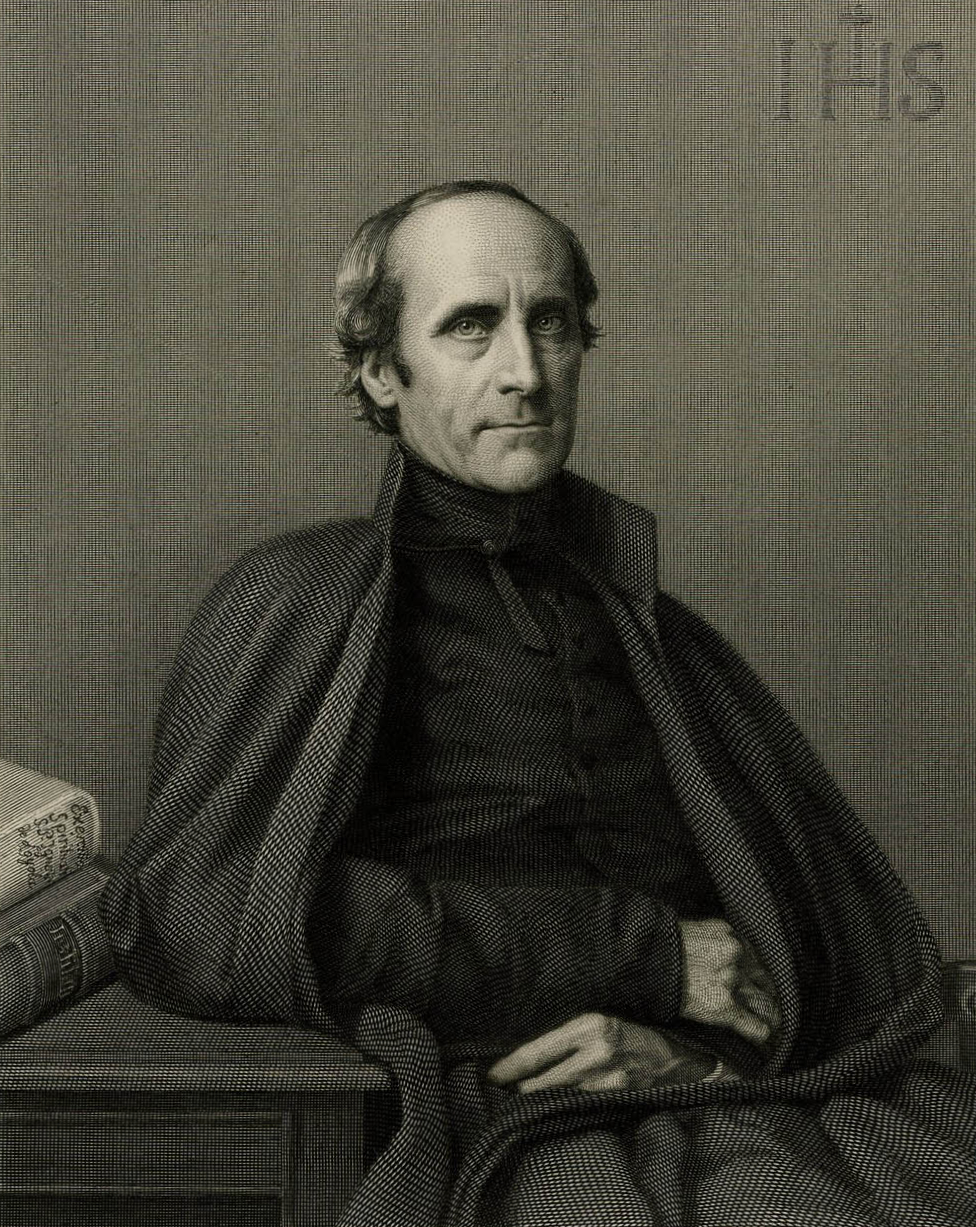
Portrait of Gustave-Xavier de La Croix de Ravignan, etching by Achille-Louis Martinet after Juliette de Bourge, 1855

Gustave François Xavier Delacroix de Ravignan (2 December 1795, Bayonne, France – 26 February 1858, Paris, France) was a French Jesuit preacher and author. Educated in Paris, he resigned his army commission to study law. Auditor of the royal court. Deputy attorney-general by 1821.

Entering a Sulpician monastery, and later joining the Society of Jesus, he was ordained in 1828, and after several years as professor and retreat preacher at Montrouge, he went to Notre-Dame de Paris, where his logic, serenity, and zeal won souls by the hundreds. Superior of his brethren at Bordeaux from 1837 to 1842, and at Paris from 1848 to 1851. He preached throughout France and in Rome, Belgium, and London. His calm, eloquent De l'Existence et de l'Institut des Jesuites of 1844, vindicating the Society, sold 25,000 copies in one year. However, the Jesuits' strife continued until they were forced to disband for a time in France.

Despite painful controversy with his superiors and imputations from other quarters, he remained loyal to his order. In 1854 he brought out Clement XIII et Clement XIV, a dispassionate treatise, of no great literary merit, on the defender and the suppressor of the Jesuits. He steadfastly refused preferment, even the archbishopric of Paris, devoting himself to other works. He died a saintly death, and thousands followed the remains of the "Apostle of Paris" to his grave.

== Works ==
- De l'existence et de l'institut des Jésuites (7. Ed., Par. 1855)
- Clément XIII et Clément XIV (2. Ed. 1856, 2 Vols.)
- Conférences prêchées à Notre-Dame de Paris (2. Ed. 1867, 4 Vols.)
- Entretiens spirituels (2 Vols).

His biography was written by Jean Joseph François Poujoulat (2. Ed. 1862).
