= Jean-Frédéric Possoz =

French politician (1797–1875)

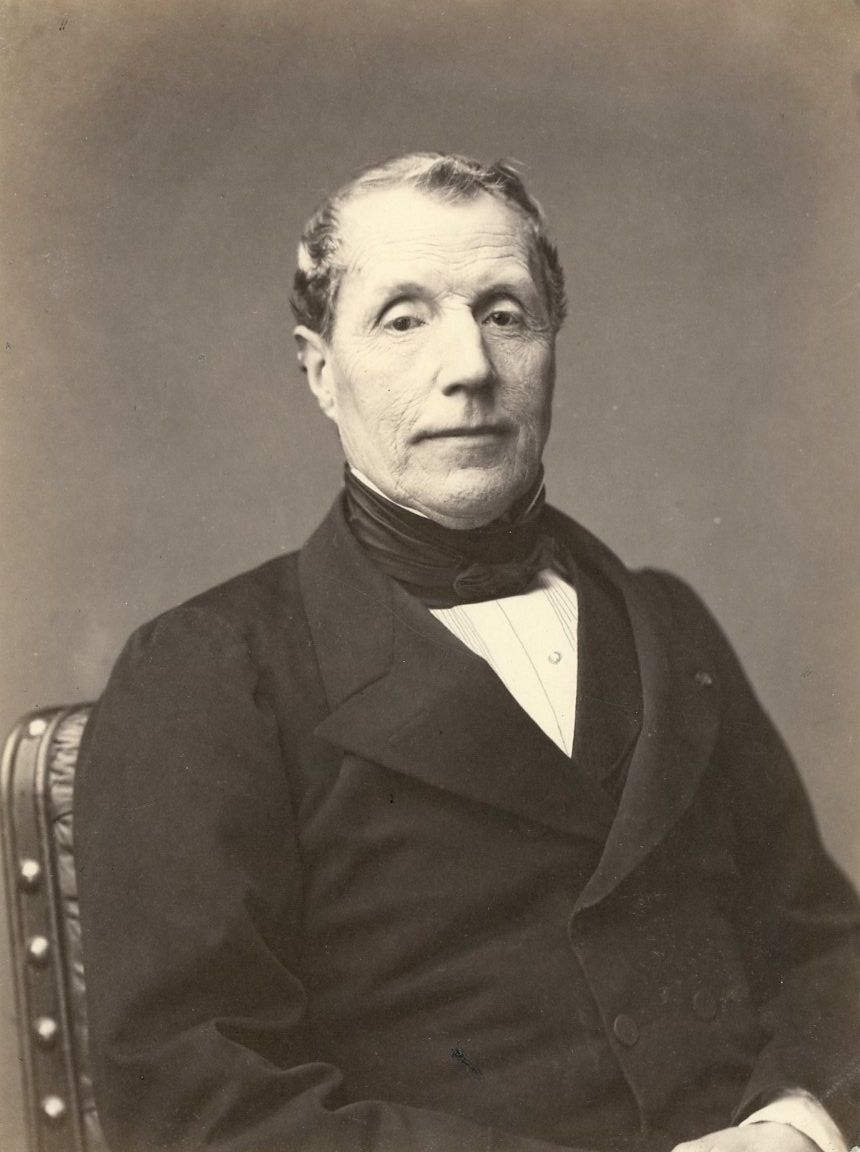
Photograph of Possoz by Pierre Petit, 1864.

Jean-Frédéric Possoz (1 October 1797 - 6 May 1875) was a French politician.

== Life ==
He was born in what was then the seventh arrondissement of Paris to Nicolas Possoz and Marie-Thérèse Huiart and like his father became a businessman. In that role he travelled to Switzerland to trade in muslin. He retired from business in 1827 and moved to Passy, then in the outskirts of Paris. After the July Revolution his fellow citizens elected him an officer of the National Guard.

In 1832, during the 1826–1837 cholera pandemic, he set up a dispensary in his town. On 27 March 1834 he was elected Passy's mayor, a role he held until 1848 then again from 1852 to 1860 - his second term ended when Passy was merged into Paris.

In 1835 he came into conflict with Hyacinthe-Louis de Quélen, Archbishop of Paris, who intended to impose a priest on the inhabitants of Passy against their will. A few years later he won a trial against Edmond de Talleyrand-Périgord, duc de Dino, who owed him money.

He was made a Knight of the Légion d'honneur in May 1838 before being promoted to Officer in the same order on 11 August 1864. He died in the 16th arrondissement of Paris, in which a square is now named after him.

=== 13th arrondissement of Paris ===
He is notable for his opposition to baron Haussmann's planned numbering of the new twenty arrondissements of Paris in 1859, going from north to south and from west to east. Beginning on the Rive Droite, which had twelve of the new arrondissements, the planned numbering continued along the Rive Gauche, giving Auteuil number 13 and the Faubourg Saint-Marcel number 20.

During the former system of twelve arrondissements the saying "to marry in the thirteenth arrondissement" meant a couple living together without being married. In 1866, in his entry for 'arrondissement', Pierre Larousse stated ""Being married in the thirteenth arrondissement" - that is to say, when Paris only had twelve arrondissements, to live as husband and wife, without being married". Michel Carmona also refers to the phrase, as did Balzac in Béatrix ("Nobody blamed the marquis for his "marrying in the thirteenth arrondissement").

This offended middle-class people in Passy, who saw it as a potential source of scandal. Possoz protested to the prefect of the Seine. Haussmann therefore changed the numbering, accepting Possoz's suggestion that they spiral out from the centre instead, thus assigning the number 13 to a popular and less demanding district and putting Auteuil in the sixteenth arrondissement.

== External links (in French) ==
- Base Léonore
- Pages généalogiques de Louis Possoz (consulté le 12 septembre 2011)
- Biographie des hommes du jour, volume 4, par Germain Sarrut (consulté le 23 mai 2010)
- Haussmann by Michel Carmona, Fayard, 2000, ISBN 2-213-60637-4
