= Achille-Louis Martinet =

French engraver (1806–1877)

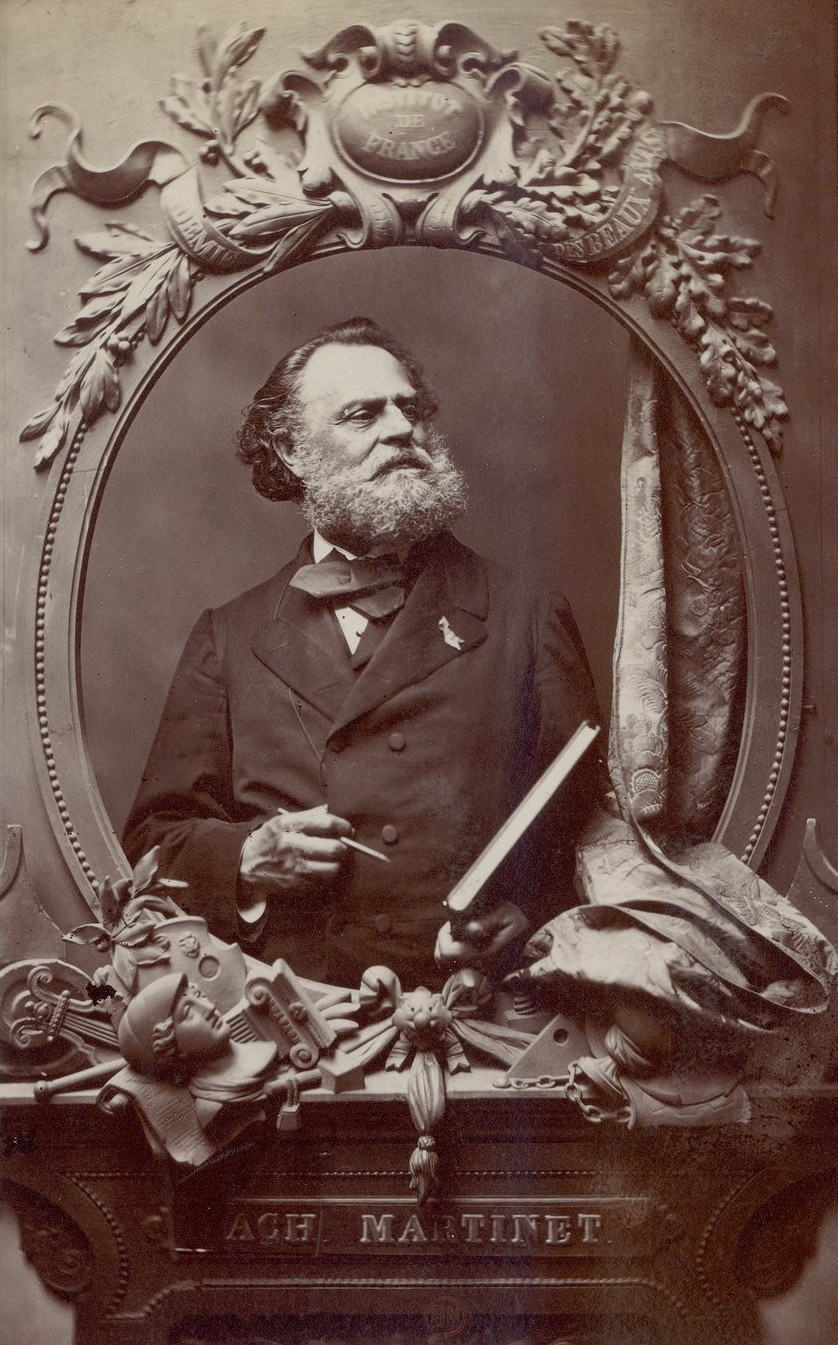
Achille Martinet; photograph by Nadar

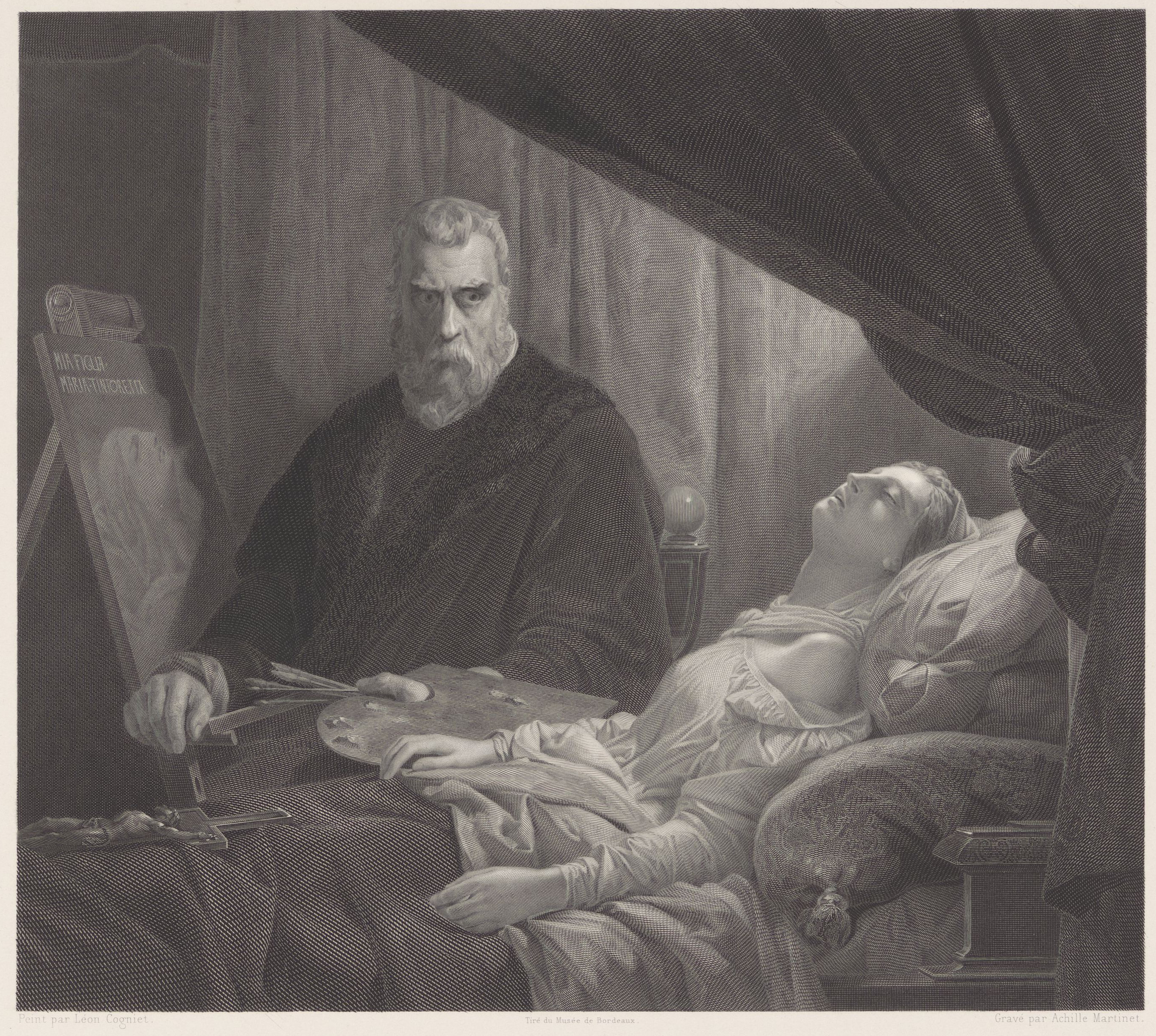
Tintoretto at His Daughter's Deathbed, after Léon Cogniet

Achille-Louis Martinet (21 January 1806, Paris – 9 December 1877, Paris) was a French engraver.

== Biography ==
He studied with François Forster and François Joseph Heim. In 1926, he was awarded second prize at the Prix de Rome, for his intaglios, and received the Grand Prize in 1830. Then, from 1831 to 1835, he lived at the Villa Medici while studying at the Académie de France à Rome which, at that time, was directed by Ingres.

He was elected to the Académie des Beaux-Arts in 1857, where he took Seat #4 for engraving, succeeding Auguste Gaspard Louis Desnoyers, who had held that position for forty-one years. His students there included Ernest-Jean Aubert, Gustave Bertinot, Jacques Martial Deveaux, and Joseph-Gabriel Tourny; all four of whom would go on to win the Prix de Rome.

In 1846, he was named a Knight in the Legion of Honor, and was elevated to Officer in 1867. The Rue Achille-Martinet in the 18th arrondissement of Paris is named after him.

He is best known for his work with a burin. His engravings include representations of paintings by old masters such as Raphaël, Rembrandt, and Murillo, as well as contemporaries, such as Ary Scheffer, Robert-Fleury, and Ingres. His youngest brother, Alphonse Martinet (1821-1861), was also an engraver.
