= Adolphe Goupil =

French art dealer and publisher (1806–1893)

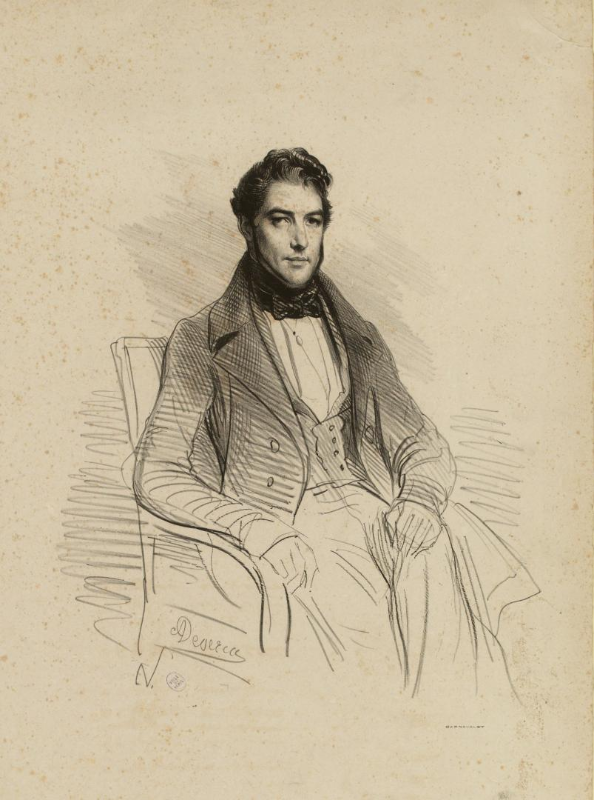
Adolphe Goupil, print publisher, lithograph by Achille Devéria, c. 1831 (Musée Carnavalet).

Jean-Baptiste Michel Adolphe Goupil (11 March 1806 - 9 May 1893) was a French industrialist and one of the most important art dealers and art publishers in 19th-century France. He founded the international art dealers Goupil & C^{ie}. He is not to be confused with the painter and engraver Jules-Adolphe Goupil (1839–1883).

== Family ==
He was the son of pharmacist Auguste Goupil and his wife Anne Lutton (1774-1849). This made him grandson to the painter G. Drouais. In August 1829 he married Victorine Elisabeth Brincard (1808-1886) from Belfort, with whom he had five children : Auguste Léon (1830-1855), Amélie (1835-1866), Albert (1840-1884), Marie (1841-1912) and Blanche (1845-?).

== Life ==
He was born in the former 2nd arrondissement of Paris and by 1827 was a publisher based at 12 boulevard Montmartre in the city. That year he joined forces with the German print dealer Heinrich Rittner (1802-1840) to print and publish original prints and art interpretation from all countries but mainly France, Britain and Germany. Rittner's family was based in Dresden and already working in the prints trade, expanding the new partnership's sales network in Europe. They produced reproductions of grand masters and modern works from the Paris Salon. Rittner disappeared in 1840 and the address became 15 boulevard Montmartre.

In 1841 Goupil found a new business partner, Théodore Vibert (1813-1850), and the company was renamed "Goupil & Vibert et C^{ie}", based at 17 rue de Lancry, moving the following year to 19 boulevard Montmartre and 12 rue d'Enghien. In 1845-1848, Goupil et Vibert opened a branch in London, then another in New York at 289 Broadway. Vibert died in 1850, leaving two children, to whom Goupil became guardian.

== Selected works ==
- 1858, Œuvre de Paul Delaroche, reproduite en photographie par Robert Jefferson Bingham, texte de la notice par Henri Delaborde, et du Catalogue Raisonné par Jules Goddé, Paris, Goupil et C^{ie} 19 boulevard Montmartre, et 9 rue Chaptal.
- 1863, Souvenir de la Galerie Pourtalès, reproduction d'antiques, Tableaux et Objets d'art les plus remarquables de la collection du Comte de Pourtalès-Gorgier: James-Alexandre de Pourtalès, volume grand in-folio comprenant 63 planches, prix de vente 300 francs. Photographe non identifié. La vente eut lieu en février 1865.
