= Adoption of the euro in France =

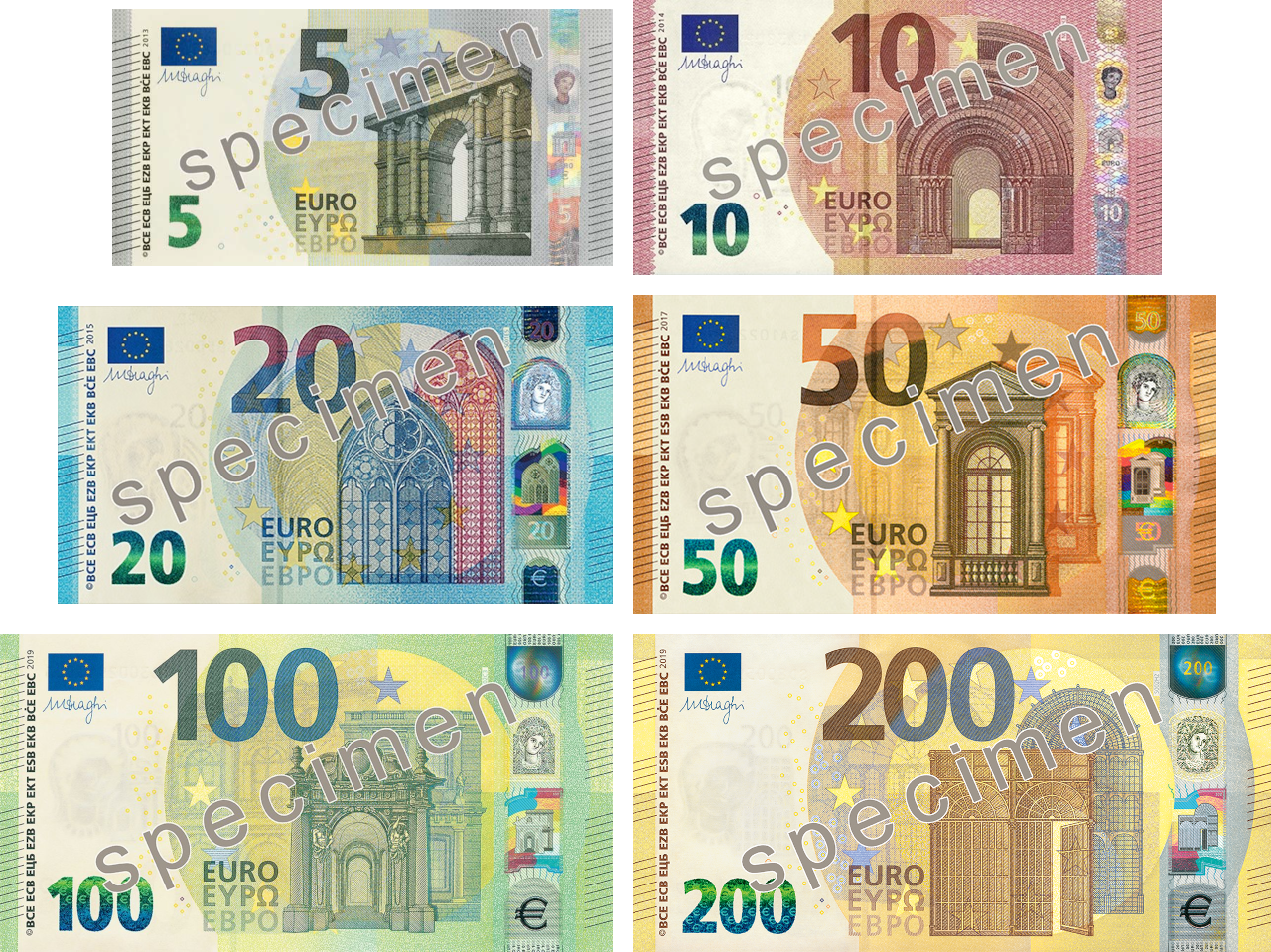
- Euro banknotes - all denominations
- Date: 1 January 2002 (Introduction); 17 February 2002 (Complete transition)
- Location: France
- Type: Economic transition
- Theme: Adoption of the euro as the national currency
- Outcome: Replacement of the French franc with the euro

Eurozone participation European Union member states (special territories not shown) 21 in the eurozone 1 in ERM II, with an opt-out (Denmark) 5 not in ERM II, but committed to join the eurozone after meeting the convergence criteria (Czech Republic, Hungary, Poland, Romania, and Sweden) Non–EU member states 4 using the euro with a monetary agreement (Andorra, Monaco, San Marino, and Vatican City) 2 using the euro unilaterally (Kosovo and Montenegro)

France was one of the first countries to adopt the euro after its introduction in 1999, phasing out its previous national currency, the French franc, entirely after 1 January 2002.

== History ==
=== Conceptualization of the euro on European level ===
The conceptualization of the euro began in the late 1970s, sparked by the desire for a European response to the dominance of the U.S. dollar. German Chancellor Helmut Schmidt and French President Valéry Giscard d’Estaing played pivotal roles in this development. Initially, the euro served as an accounting unit for international transactions, known as the ECU, before evolving into a common currency. The euro officially came into existence on 1 January 1999, as part of efforts to create an economic and monetary union within the European Union.

France was one of the first countries to adopt the euro, with the French franc ceasing to be legal tender after 31 December 2001.

=== Process of euro adoption in France ===
The transition to the euro in France involved a three-year period, starting from 1 January 1999, during which the euro existed as "book money". Euro banknotes and coins were introduced on 1 January 2002. This was the earliest date for any member state when the national currency ceased to be legal tender. The French government introduced dual circulation period – when both the French franc and the euro had legal tender status – ended on 17 February 2002. The government of France replacing the French franc at a fixed conversion rate of 6.55957 FRF per one euro. French government and financial institutions undertook extensive efforts to ensure a seamless transition to the Euro. This included the modification of financial software, recalibration of ATMs, and widespread distribution of new euro banknotes and coins. Also, the exchange of the former French national currency was done by the Banque de France (Bank of France) exchanged French franc coins until 17 February 2005 and franc banknotes until 17 February 2012.

== See also ==
- History of the European Union
- French euro coins
- French franc
- Enlargement of the eurozone
- International status and usage of the euro
- Economic and monetary union
- History of the euro
- European Currency Unit
- European Central Bank
- European Union
- European Economic Community
- History of France
