= Gustave Bertinot =

French engraver

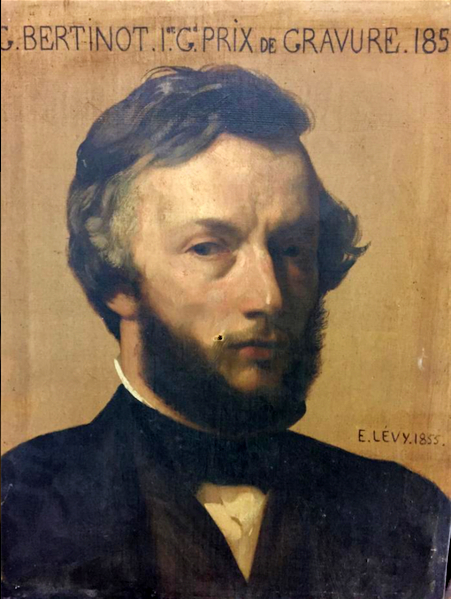
Gustave Bertinot (1855), by Émile Lévy

Gustave Nicolas Bertinot (French: [ɡystav bɛʁtino]; 23 June 1822, Louviers - 19 April 1888, Paris) was a French engraver. He was primarily known for his intaglio work.

== Biography ==
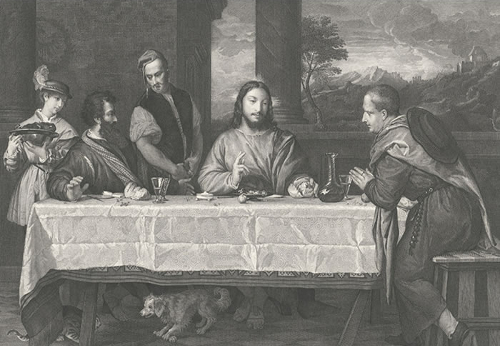
The Supper at Emmaus, after Titian

He was born to Augustin Victor Bertinot, a drape manufacturer, and his wife Françoise Aurore, née Lelièvre. A childhood injury to his hip left him with a limp. He showed an early aptitude for drawing and, after completing his primary studies, decided to become an engraver. At the age of fifteen, his parents agreed to enroll him in classes taught by Hippolyte Pauquet. Later, he studied with Alexis-François Girard.

Finally, he finished his studies with Michel Martin Drolling and Achille-Louis Martinet. The latter was especially supportive; helping him to prepare for a major competition in 1848. He won the award for engraving at the Prix de Rome in 1850, spending several years at the Villa Medici.

Upon returning, he established a studio in Paris on the Rue de la Pompe. In 1863, he married Élise Mélanie Léonie Soyez, the granddaughter of Baron Soyez. Their son, Émile Bertinot (1864-1936), was a jurist who served as Mayor of Meudon

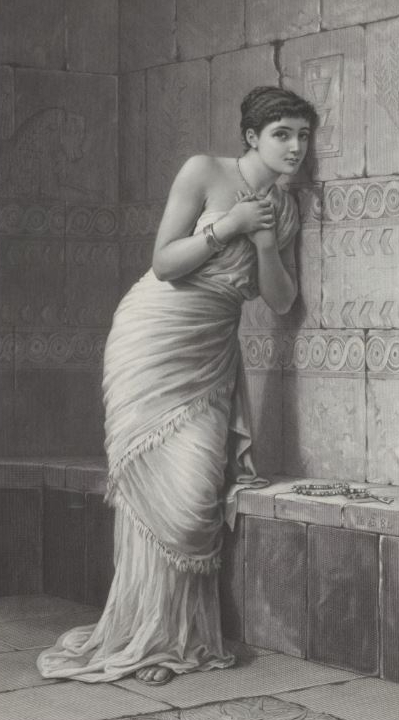
Thisbe, after Edwin Long

He was named a Knight in the Legion of Honor in 1867, and a professor of engraving at the École des Beaux-Arts in 1875. His students included William Barbotin. In 1878. he was elected to the Académie des Beaux-Arts, where he took Seat #4 for engraving, succeeding his former teacher, Martinet, who had died the year before.

He was interred at the Cimetière du Montparnasse, and his eulogy was delivered by Oscar Roty.
