= Marius-Michel =

French bookbinder and author (1846–1925)

Marius-Michel, Marius Michel or Marius-Michel fils (28 December 1846 - 9 May 1925) were the pseudonyms of Henri-François-Victor Michel, a French bookbinder. He was one of the most important 19th-century French bookbinders.

== Life ==
Born in the former 1st arrondissement of Paris, he began his career in the workshop of his father Jean Michel (1821–1890), known as Marius-Michel père, a renowned gilder. He and his father set up a joint workshop in 1876 at 15 Rue du Four in Paris. He won one of the first medals at the 1878 Exposition Universelle by leaving behind the fashion for pastiche and returning to ornamental decoration and floral motifs. He also brought engraved and incised leather back into fashion in France for the first time since the 16th century, working for figures such as Léon Conquet.

In 1895 he was appointed to the école Estienne's advisory committee. He won first prize in the 1900 Exposition Universelle. He died at his home at 12 rue Pierre-Nicole in the 5th arrondissement of Paris in 1925 after entrusting his workshop to Georges Cretté seven years earlier.

== Essays ==
- Essai sur la décoration extérieure des livres, 1878.
- La reliure française depuis l'invention de l'imprimerie, 1880-1881.
- L'ornementation des reliures modernes, 1889.

== Bibliography ==
- (in French) Petit Palais, musée des Beaux-Arts de la Ville de Paris (1927). Exposition rétrospective Marius Michel Mai-Juin 1927 [Marius Michel Retrospective Exhibition, May-June 1927] (in French). Paris: École Estienne.
- Alastair Duncan; Georges De Bartha (1989). Art Nouveau and Art Deco Book Binding: French Masterpieces, 1880-1940. New York: Harry N. Abrams. ISBN 978-0-8109-1881-8..
