= Jules Girard (classicist) =

French classicist, specialising in ancient Greece

- Born: 24 February 1825; Paris, France
- Died: 30 March 1902 (aged 77); Cannes, France
- Known for: Studies on ancient Greek literature
- Parents: Alexis-François Girard (father); Louise Marthelot (mother)

Jules Augustin Girard (24 February 1825 - 30 March 1902) was a French classicist, specialising in ancient Greece. He contributed to several journals such as Revue des Deux Mondes and Journal des savants.

== Life ==
He was born in Vincennes or Paris to the engraver Alexis-François Girard (1787-1870) and studied at the École normale supérieure, from which he gained an agrégation de lettres in 1847. He then became professor of rhetoric at the collège royal de Vendôme (1847-1848), served at the École française d'Athènes (1848-1851) and travelled in Euboea. Next he taught rhetoric at the lycée Faidherbe in Lille (1851) and the lycée in Montpellier (1853).

On 4 November 1854 he successfully defended two theses and gained his doctorate at the Faculté de Paris - one was in French on the characteristics of atticism in Lysias's eloquence and the other in Latin on the genius of the Megarans.

From 1854 to 1868 he headed a conference on ancient Greek language and literature, before being made a maître de conférences at the École normale supérieure. On 13 August he was made a Knight of the Légion d'honneur, rising to Officer in the same order on 18 January 1881 - his sponsor for the latter appointment was Désiré Nisard. In 1868 he was put in charge of an ancient Greek literature course at the Faculté des lettres de Paris, then in 1869 became acting successor to Henri Patin as holder of the Latin poetry chair.

In 1873 he became a member of the Académie des inscriptions et belles-lettres and the following year became chair of ancient Greek poetry at the Faculté des lettres de Paris. From 1896 to 1902 he was head of the Fondation Thiers. He died in Cannes in 1902.

== Works ==
- Mémoires sur l'île d'Eubée, 1852.
- Des caractères de l'atticisme dans l'éloquence de Lysias, 1854, doctoral thesis.
- De Megarensium ingenio, 1854, doctoral thesis.
- Essai sur Thucydide, 1859.
- Hypéride, sa vie et son éloquence, 1860.
- Le Sentiment religieux en Grèce (1868), 'crowned' by the Académie française.
- Études sur l'éloquence attique, 1874.
- Études sur la poésie grecque, 1884.
- Poètes moralistes de la Grèce. Notices et traductions par MM. Joseph Daniel Guigniaut, Henri Patin, Jules Girard, … et L. Humbert, Paris : Garnier frères, in octavo, VIII-320 p., 1892.

== Bibliography ==
- Eve Gran-Aymerich, Les chercheurs de passé, Éditions du CNRS, 2007, p. 830
