= La Semeuse =

French coin design

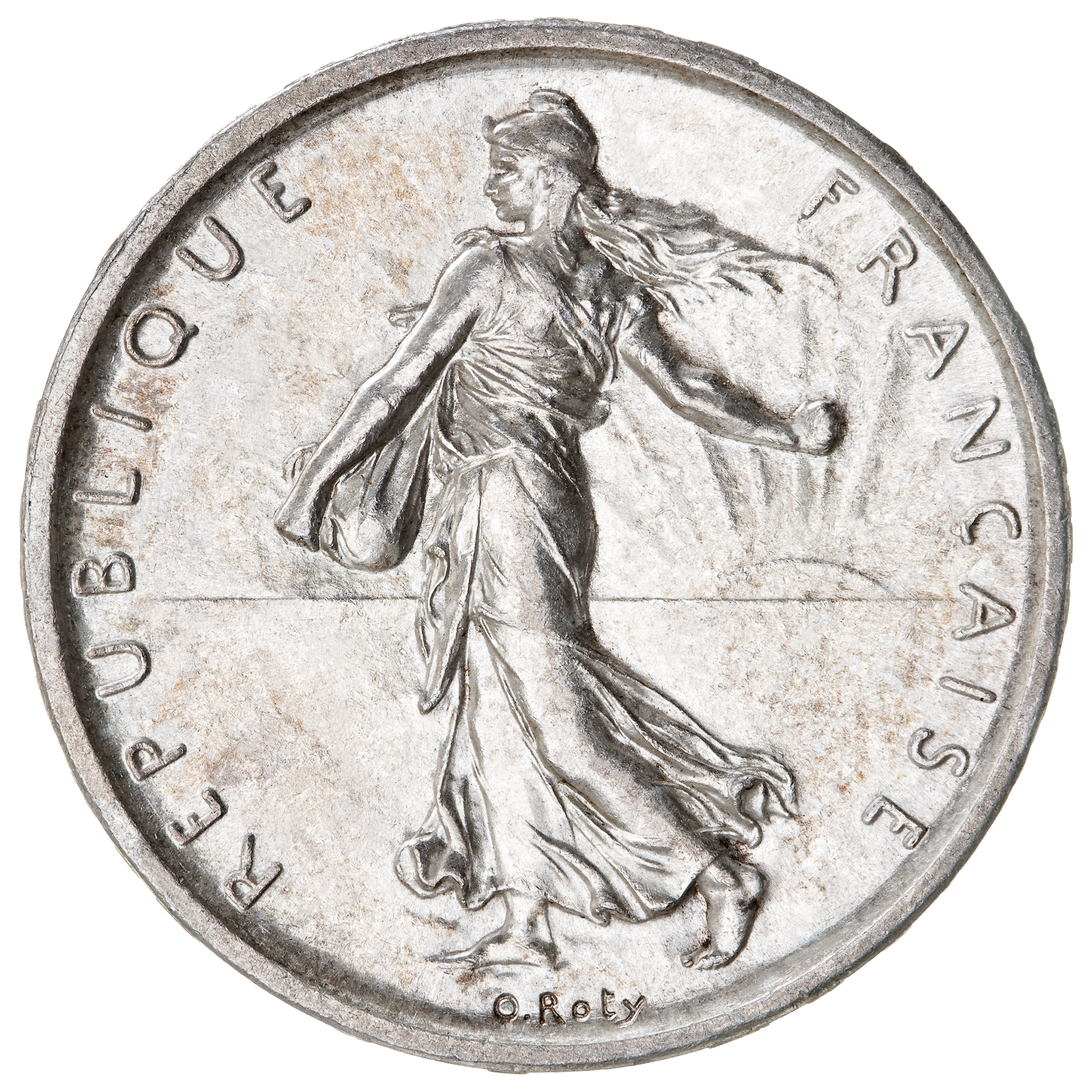
Engraving of the Semeuse featured on the 1960 5 Francs silver coin.

La Semeuse is a type of coin designed and engraved by French numismatist Oscar Roty (1846–1911). Its design, created in 1897 for use on the silver coins of the French Third Republic, reused in 1960 for the new francs, has become one of the three symbols, along with the bust of Marianne and the Tree of Liberty, chosen by France to appear on the national obverse side of the Euro.

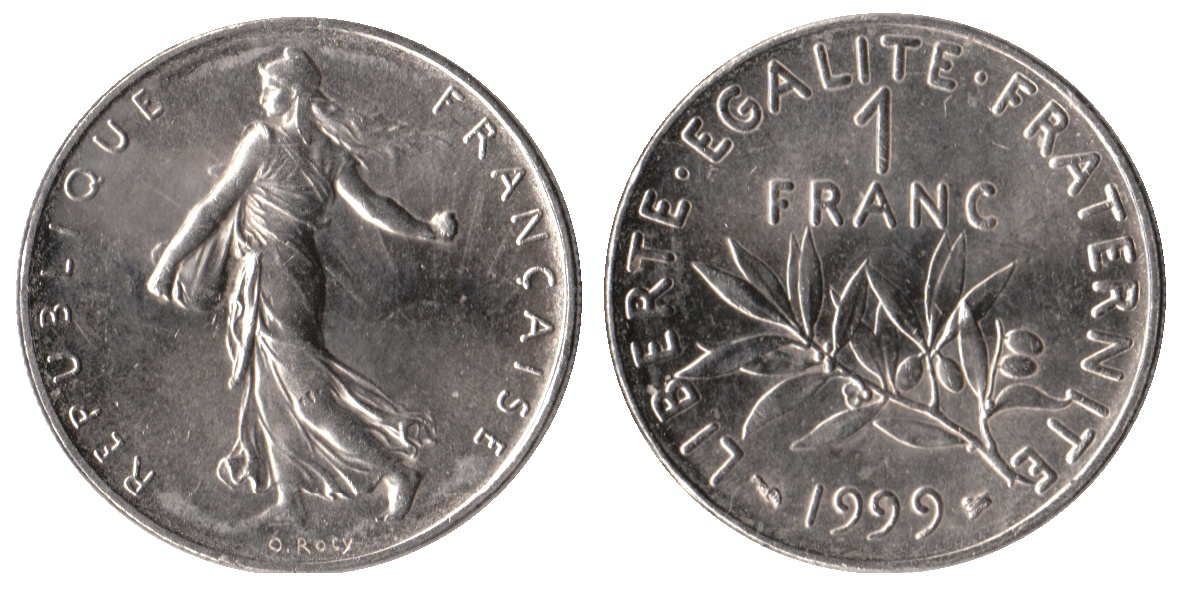
1999 1 Franc coin

The obverse of this type represents a barefoot woman walking through a plain, dressed in a flowing gown and apron; wearing a Phrygian cap, she carries a large sack in one hand and sows with the other, while the sun rises on the horizon and the wind blows; facing to the left, she seems to be sowing against the wind. This motif is in the Art Nouveau style.

The classic reverse of the Semeuse coins typically shows:

- A prominent olive branch (sometimes interpreted as including oak).
- The face value of the coin (e.g., "1 FRANC").
- The motto of the French Republic: "Liberté, Égalité, Fraternité." (Liberty, Equality, Fraternity)
- The year of striking.

== 1897 issue ==
The "Ceres" type, which appeared on coins from the Second French Republic, and was then reused by the French Third Republic after the interruption of the Empire, was becoming outdated. It was on the initiative of the Minister of Finance Paul Doumer that Oscar Roty, a renowned artist of the time, was selected in late November 1895 to design a new symbol of the Republic for silver coins. In 1897, the first 50 centime Semeuse coins were met with immediate success among the public. The theme of the Semeuse, wearing the Phrygian cap, was treated in a way that was innovative for coins of the time. A 5 francs coin, whose first trials were struck as early as 1897, could not be issued due to the agreement binding France to the Latin Monetary Union: no 5 francs coins had been struck since 1879, due to the instability of silver prices and the high cost of striking. From 1914 onwards, official silver (and bronze) coins almost ceased to circulate as they were hoarded by individuals. To address this shortage of coins, local authorities, chambers of commerce, merchants, etc., issued emergency currency. However, the striking of silver Semeuse coins continued until 1920, without slowing down.

== 1960 issue ==
The French franc had suffered devaluations since 1931, and by 1958 its value had dropped to very low levels; for about fifteen years, it had been an aluminium coin. To restore the symbolic value of the currency, the government of Charles de Gaulle worked on a monetary reform from December 1958 within the framework of the new constitution of the Fifth Republic, and instituted the creation of a new franc (or "heavy franc") equal to 100 old francs. Finance Minister Antoine Pinay was responsible for its implementation. Naturally, the coin types were renewed, and to evoke the solidity of the germinal franc, the symbolic image of the Semeuse was reused with a series of denominations for values of 1, 2, and 5 new francs. The project for the 2 new franc coin was abandoned. The 5 francs coin was made of silver at 835‰ (and later nickel from 1970), while the 1 new franc coin (in nickel), issued on 1 January 1960, resembled the 1897 1 franc module (with a one-gram weight difference). This 1 franc issue set a longevity record of 41 years, with the transition to the Euro causing the end of striking in 2001. On 18 February 2005, the exchange of coins still in circulation ended at the Bank of France, after which they were demonetized.

Alongside these 1 franc and 5 francs coins (and half franc coins from 1965), the 2 francs coin (minted from 1979 to 2001) featured a modernized Semeuse.

== The Semeuse and the Euro ==
Of the three designs chosen for the national obverse side of the euro coins, one reprises the ancient Semeuse, once again modernized by Laurent Jorio, on the 10-cent, 20-cent, and 50-cent coins. Thus, Oscar Roty's work has spanned the 20th century, continuing to be a strong symbol of the French Republic; especially as the Semeuse also appeared on numerous series of postage stamps from 1903 to 1941.

At the beginning of the 21st century, the Semeuse reappeared as The Kinetic Semeuse by Joaquin Jimenez through a series of eight coins with legal tender in France (from 5 to 500 euros, in silver and gold).
