= Oscar Roty =

French medalist

Coordinates: 47°52′0.39″N 2°7′20.55″E

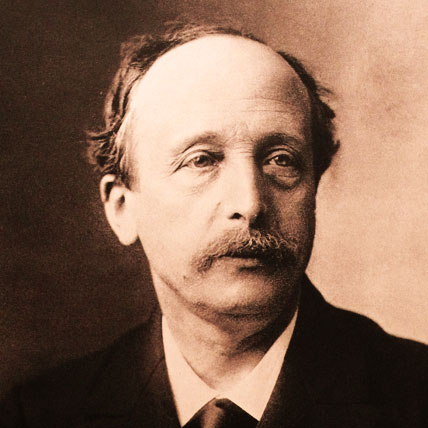
- Photograph c. 1900
- Born: Louis-Oscar Roty; 11 June 1846; Paris, Kingdom of France
- Died: 23 March 1911 (aged 64); Paris, French Republic

Louis-Oscar Roty usually known as Oscar Roty (11 June 1846 – 23 March 1911) was one of the most celebrated medallists of the Art Nouveau period.

== Biography ==
Louis-Oscar Roty was born on 11 June 1846 in Paris. He first studied painting and sculpture, working under Lecoq de Boisbaudran, Augustin-Alexandre Dumont and Hubert Ponscarme, his mentor, was largely responsible for the renewal of medallic art at the end of the nineteenth century. In 1867 he had abandoned the medal rim in his design for his medal of Naudet, the background and graphics becoming part of the sculpture. Roty, along with Champlain, Alexandre Charpentier, and others, influenced by the Art Nouveau movement, advanced this resurgence of art in medal design. Roty, in particular, introduced the Renaissance form of the plaquette, which further emphasized the significance of the medal as a work of art. He designed hundreds of art medals celebrated for their graceful designs.

Following some difficulties early in his career, in 1882 Roty won the second prize in the Prix de Rome. This success was followed by many others, including the Grand Prix de Rome in 1875 and the Grand Prix at the 1889 Exposition Universelle in Paris. He was appointed to the rank of Professor in the Académie des Beaux-Arts in 1888, and in 1897 became its president. In 1889 he became an Officer in the Legion of Honor and rose to Commander in 1900. At the height of his career, he was awarded the Medal of Honor at the Salon in 1905. In 1878 Oscar Roty married Marie Boulanger, daughter of the wrought iron craftsman Pierre Boulanger.

Besides a huge number of medals and plaquettes, Roty is well known as the designer of the "Semeuse" image on French silver coins and stamps. His medallic art can be found in nearly all European museums. A large number of his medals and plaquettes can be viewed in the Kunsthalle Hamburg and the Musée Oscar Roty in Jargeau, France.

Dr. George F. Kunz wrote about his contributions to the Medallic Arts.

== Gallery ==
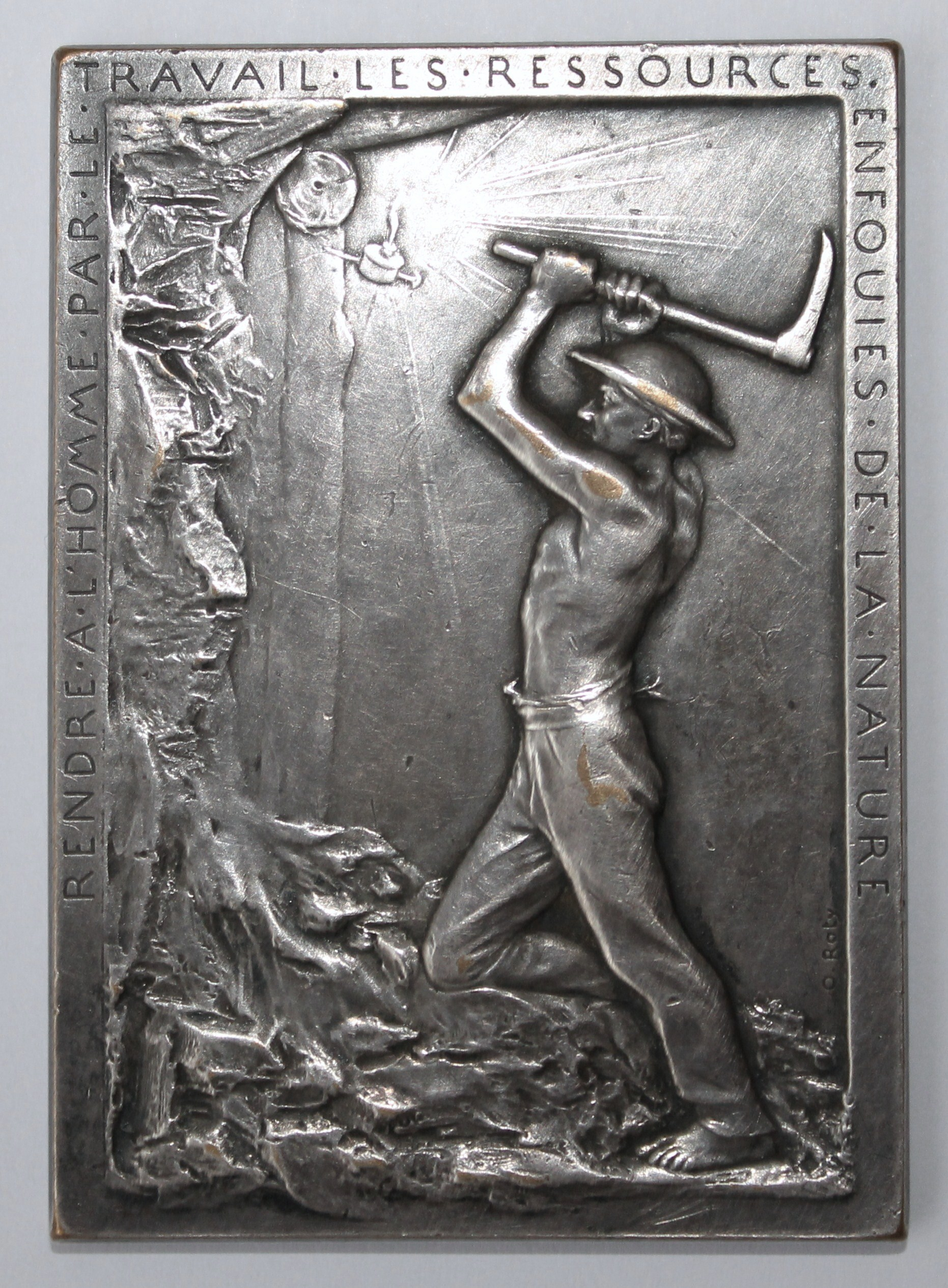
Lens Mining Company

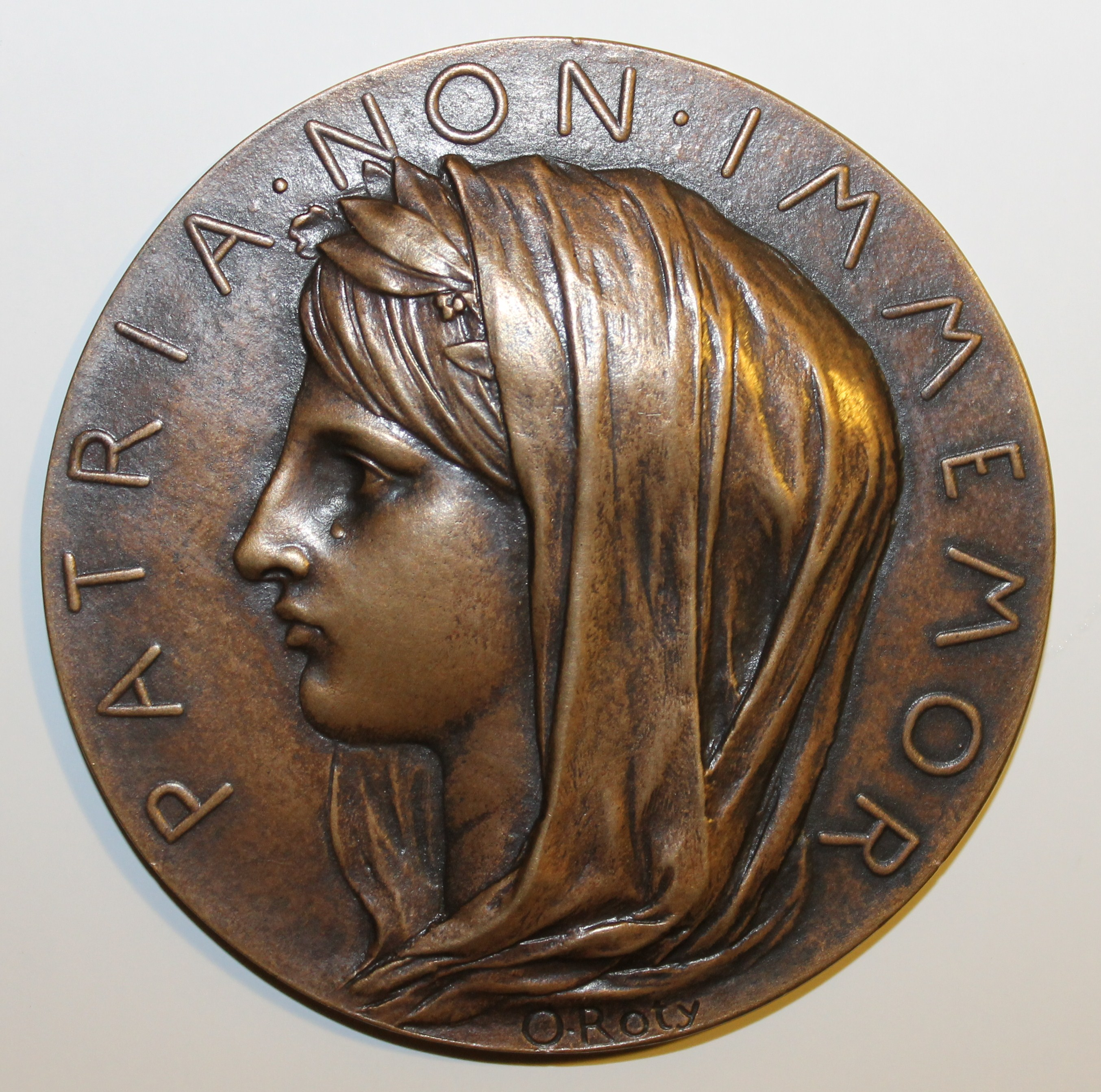
Patria 25th anniversary of the French Third Republic

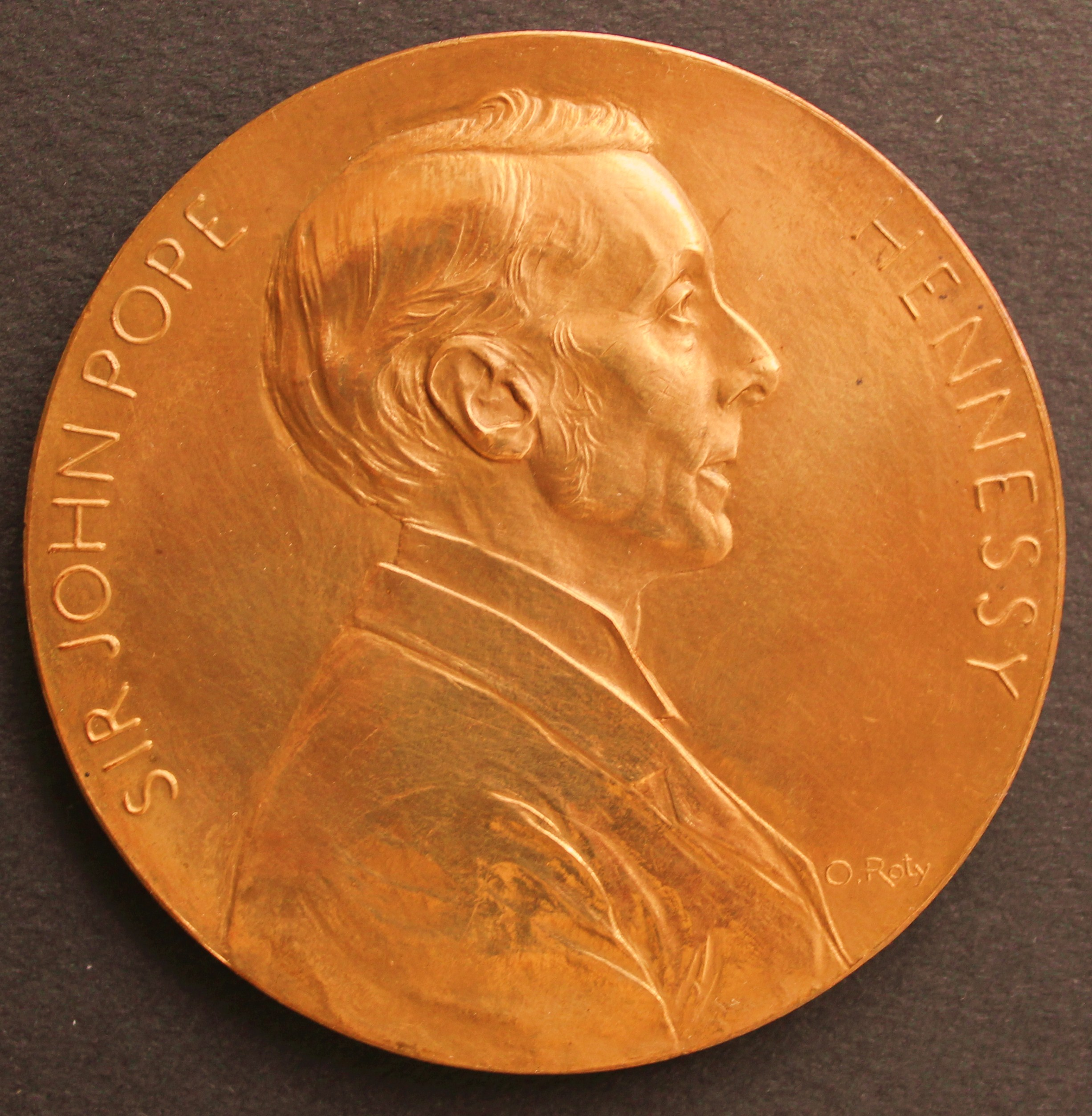
Sir John Pope Hennessy

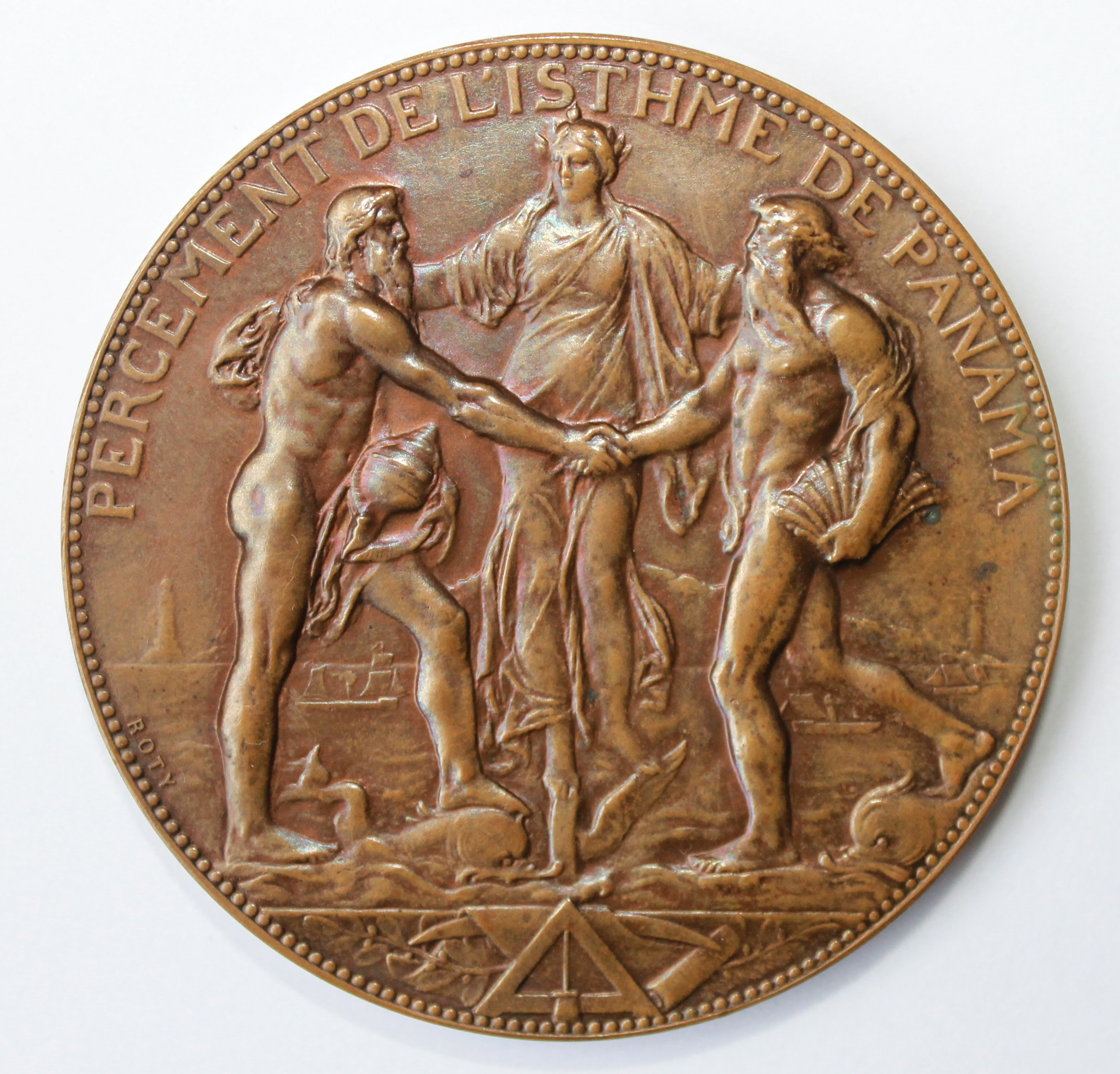
Piercing of the isthmus of Panama

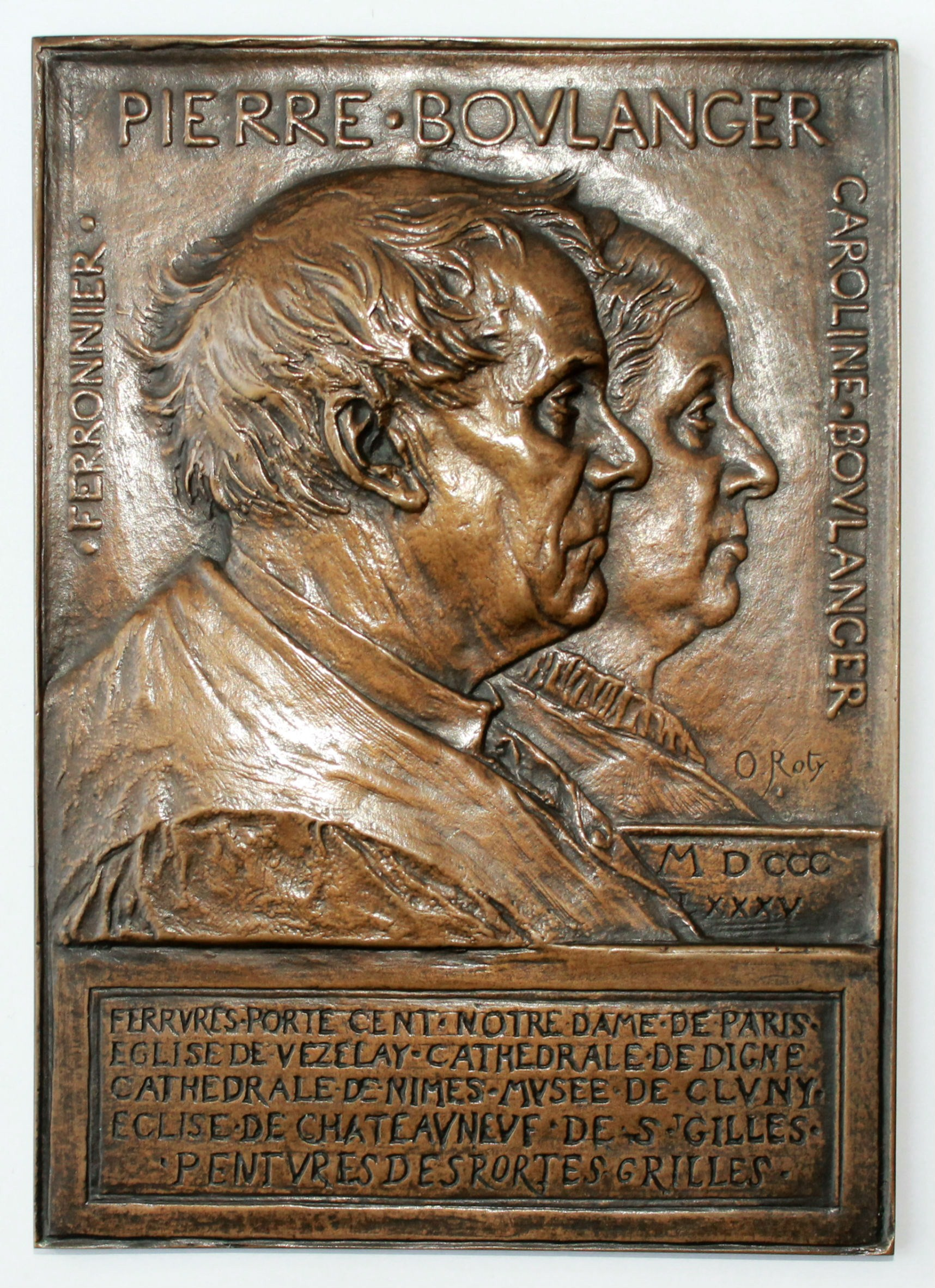
Pierre Boulanger (blacksmith)

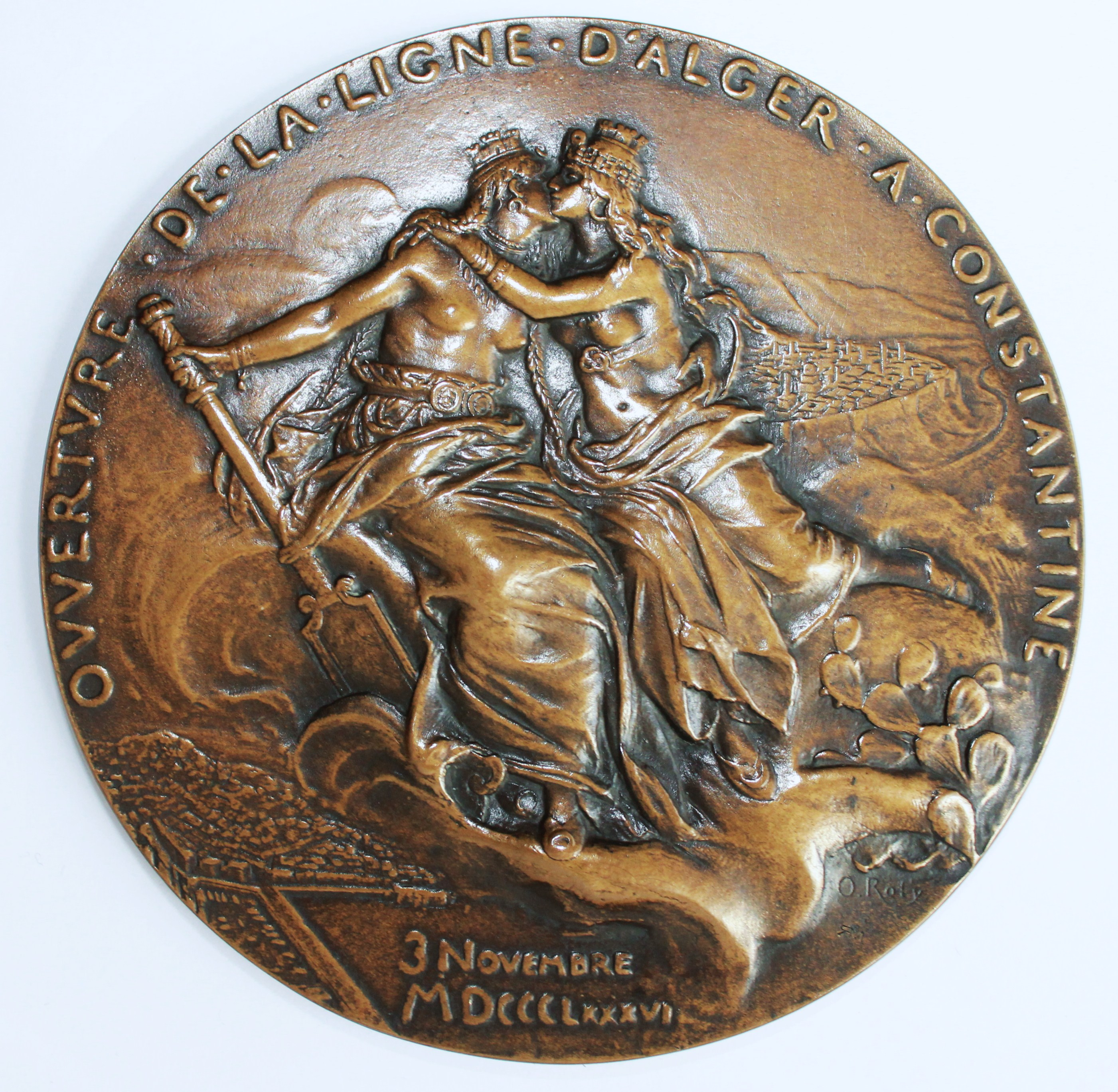
Medal of the Eastern Algeria Rail Transport

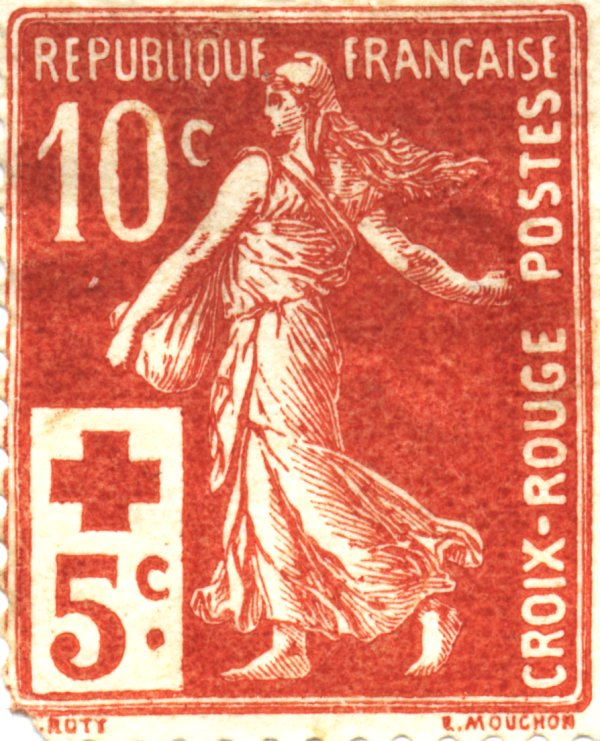
La Semeuse (the sower) on a French postage stamp of 1918

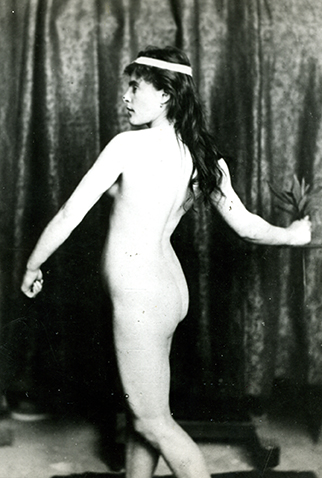
Charlotte Ragot, model from Oscar Roty for his La Semeuse
