= François-Alfred Delobbe =

French painter (1835–1920)

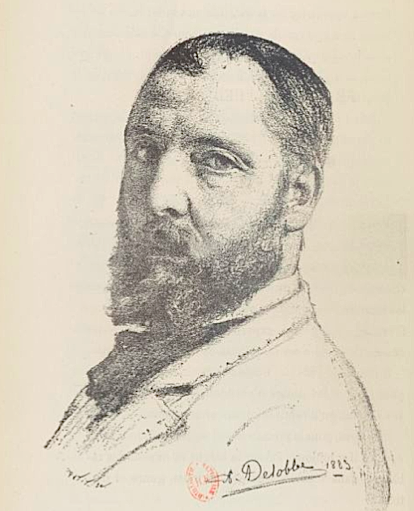
Self-portrait (1883)

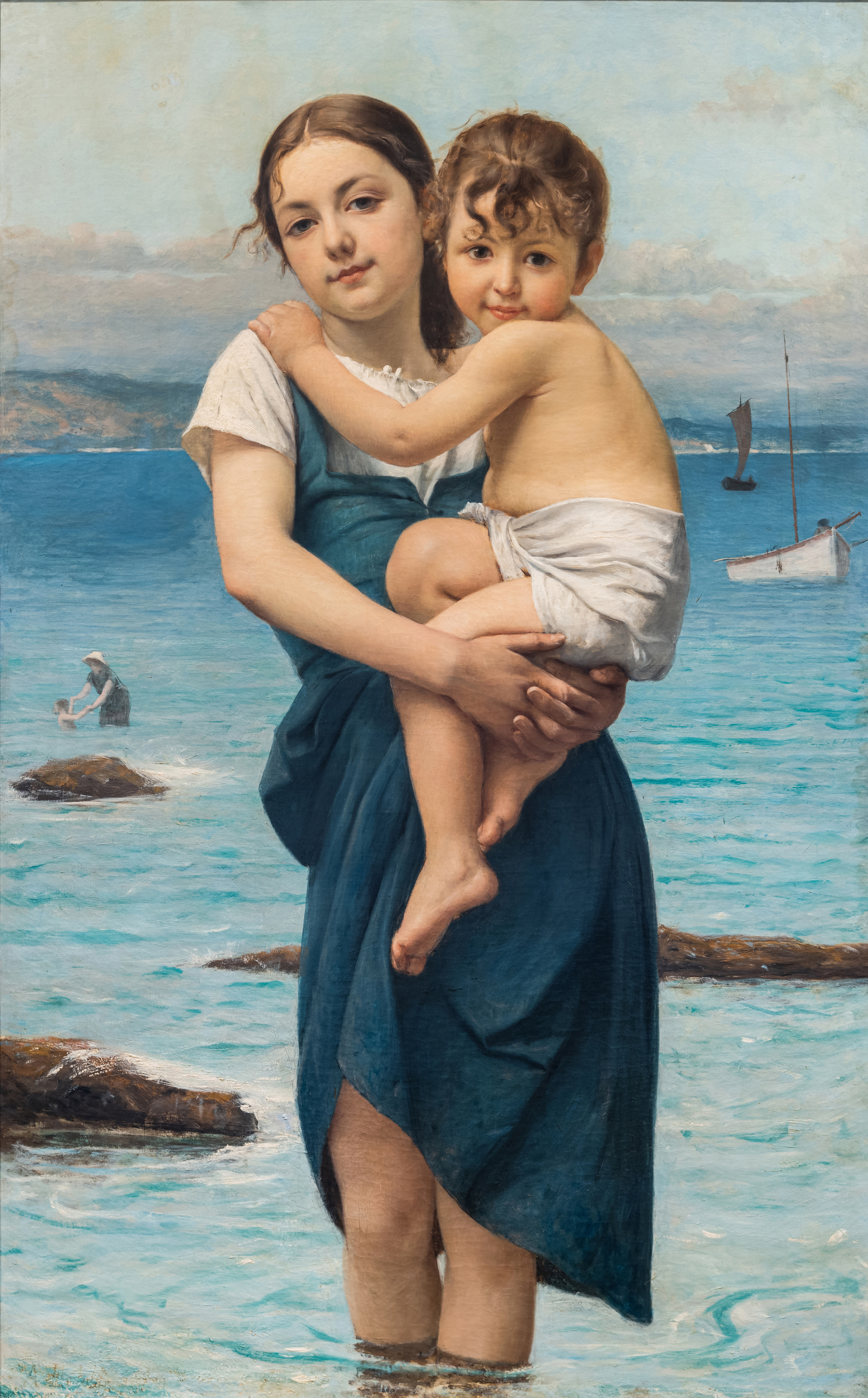
Sisters by François-Alfred Delobbe

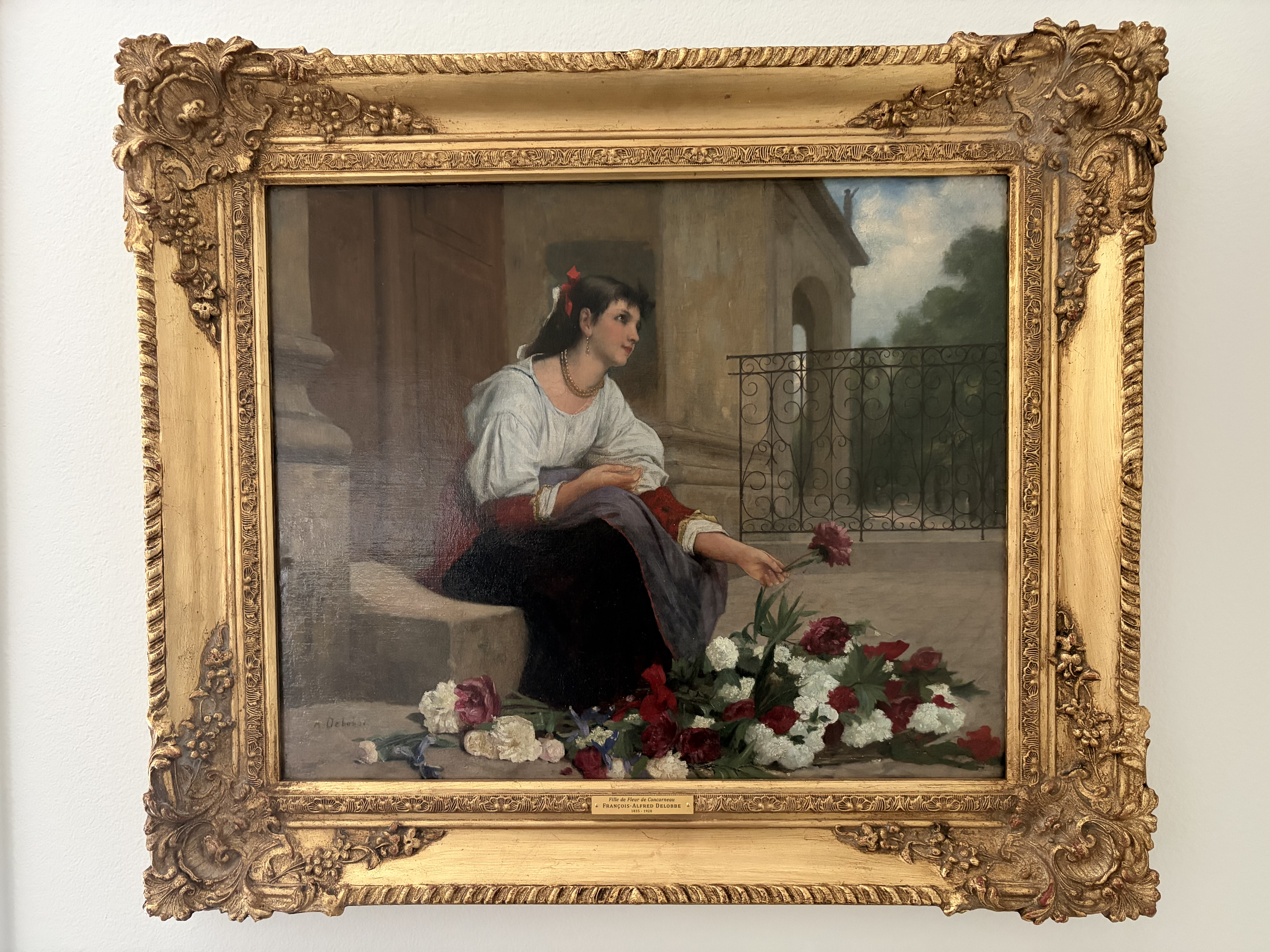
Women selling flowers

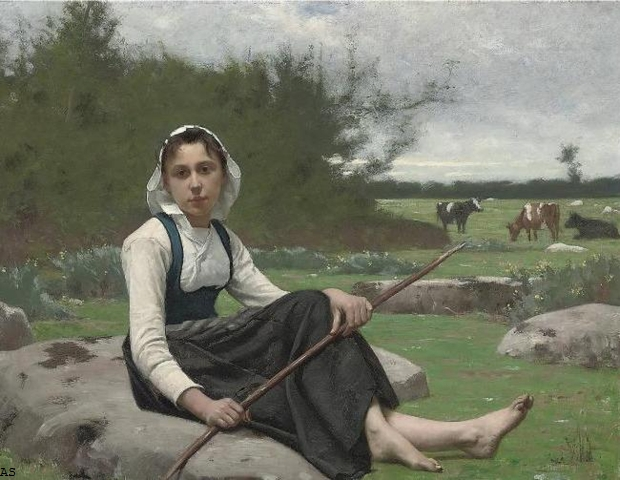
Corentine (date unknown)

François-Alfred Delobbe (13 October 1835, Paris – 10 February 1920, Paris) was a French painter in the Naturalist style.

== Biography ==
He was a student of Thomas Couture and William Bouguereau at the École des Beaux-arts, where he had been admitted at the age of sixteen, and had his debut at the Salon in 1861 with a portrait of his mother. Mythological, Orientalist and genre scenes in the Academic style were his original specialities. His career was truly launched when he obtained a commission to decorate the Town Hall of the recently annexed Fifteenth Arrondissement; one of only eight such commissions granted.

From 1875 until his death, he and his family were regular visitors at the artists' colony in Concarneau, where he had been invited to come by its founder Alfred Guillou and in whose home they sometimes stayed. The soft light of the region inspired him to focus on painting children and young women, generally in peasant scenes. He would often sketch profusely during the summer, then finish the painting during the winter at his Paris studio. Most of his models came from the Concarneau region.
