= Henri Patin =

French writer and translator of Ancient Greek and Latin

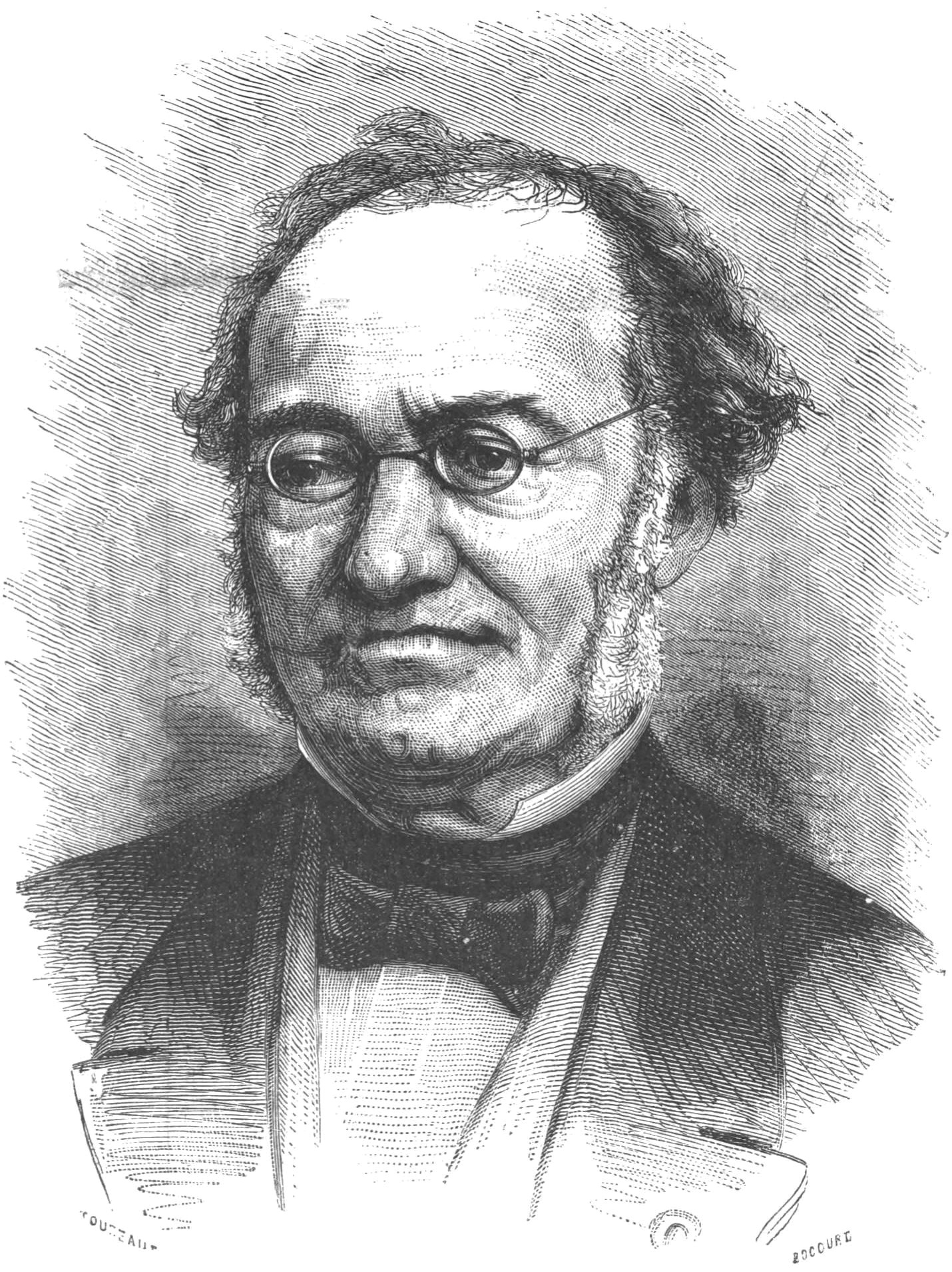
- Born: 21 August 1793 Paris, France
- Died: 19 February 1876 (aged 82)

Henri Joseph Guillaume Patin (21 August 1793, in Paris – 19 February 1876) was a French writer and translator of Ancient Greek and Latin.

== Works ==
- Mélanges de littérature ancienne et moderne (1840)
- Études sur les tragiques grecs, ou Examen critique d'Eschyle, de Sophocle et d'Euripide, précédé d'une histoire générale de la tragédie grecque (1841–43)
- Œuvres d'Horace (1866). Text online
- Études sur la poésie latine (1868–69)
- Discours et mélanges littéraires (1876)
- Odes d'Horace (1883). Text online
- Poètes moralistes de la Grèce : Hésiode, Théognis de Mégare, Callinos, Tyrtée, Mimnerme, Solon, Sémonide d'Amorgos, Phocylide, Pythagore, Aristote (1892)
- Lucretius. De la Nature (1893)
