= François Forster =

French engraver (1790–1872)

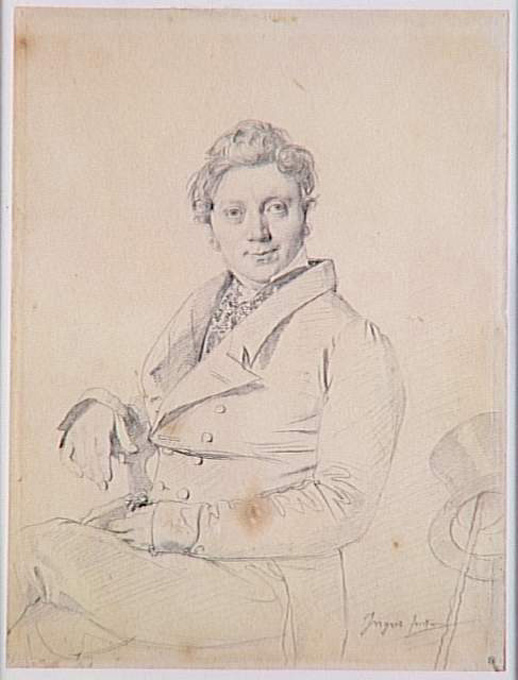
- Portrait by Dominique Ingres, 1825

François Forster (22 August 1790 - 27 June 1872) was a French engraver and lithographer.

== Biography ==
He was born at Locle, Switzerland. He studied in Paris under the engraver Pierre-Gabriel Langlois, and then studied painting and engraving at the École des Beaux-Arts, where he won the Grand Prix de Rome in 1814. The king of Prussia, who was then with the allies in Paris, bestowed on him a gold medal, and a pension of 1500 francs for two years. With the aid of this sum, Forster pursued his studies in Rome, where his attention was devoted chiefly to the works of Raphael. In 1844, he succeeded Tardieu in the Académie des Beaux-Arts.

He engraved a number of historical subjects and portraits which enhanced his reputation. Among these are: "Francis I and Charles V visiting the Church of Saint Denis" (1833, after Gros); "The Madonna of the House of Orleans" (1838, after Raphael); and the portraits of Raphael, Alexander von Humboldt, Duke of Wellington, and others.

== Gallery ==
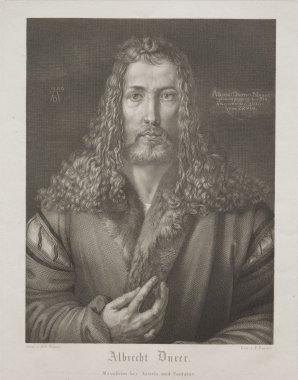
Albrecht Dürer (1822)

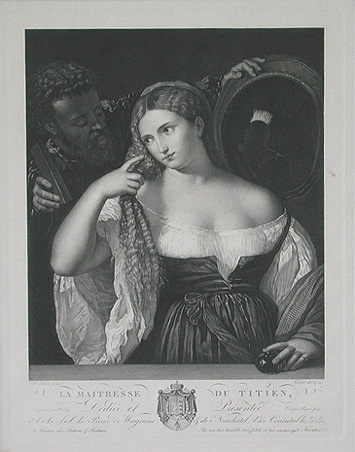
Titian's mistress (1837)

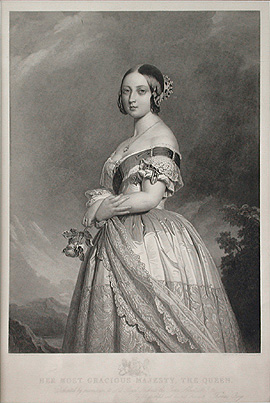
Queen Victoria (1846, after Winterhalter)
