= Drouais =

Drouais primarily refers to a person from the French commune of Dreux.

Drouais is also the surname of a family of French painters:

- François-Hubert Drouais
- Hubert Drouais
- Jean Germain Drouais
