= Arrondissements of Paris (1795–1859) =

Paris before (red) and after (grey) 1860.

The first arrondissements of Paris were established by a law dated 11 October 1795. It divided the city into twelve areas, which lasted until the law of 16 June 1859 establishing the current arrondissements of Paris.

== History ==
A law of 27 June 1790 divided Paris into 48 revolutionary sections. Each had a civil administration and a justice of the peace, along with a mayor, sixteen assistants and thirty council members.

Those sections were replaced by the 1795 law, applying the Constitution of the Year III (22 August 1795) adopted by the National Convention. Article 3 of that Constitution kept Paris as a département but renamed it the "département of the Seine". Its Article 5 suppressed Frances district's (including those of Paris) and replaced them with cantons. Finally, its article 183 foresaw the division of communes "whose population exceeds 100,000 inhabitants [in] at least three municipal administrations [whose populations] do not exceed 50,000 inhabitants, and is not less than 30,000".

Plan of Paris 1795-1860, showing its division into twelve arrondissements.

The twelve arrondissements were numbered from west to east and from north to south. Nine were on the Rive Droite and three on the Rive Gauche. They were not of equal sizes and were heirs to the former parishes, entangled, particularly in the north of Paris. The colours in the map show this lack of logic:

- the 3rd arrondissement had two sections joined at a corner
- the 5th arrondissement was in two parts joined at a corner
- Île de la Cité was divided between the 9th arrondissement along the Rive Droite and the 11th arrondissement along the Rive Gauche

Article 2 of the 1795 law stated that "the territory which was previously the commune of Paris, circumscribed by the limits designated by the laws of 21 May, 27 June and 19-23 October 1790, shall form a canton". Its article 3 foresaw that "there shall be twelve municipalities in the canton of Paris", whilst its article 4 grouped together the 48 former revolutionary sections.

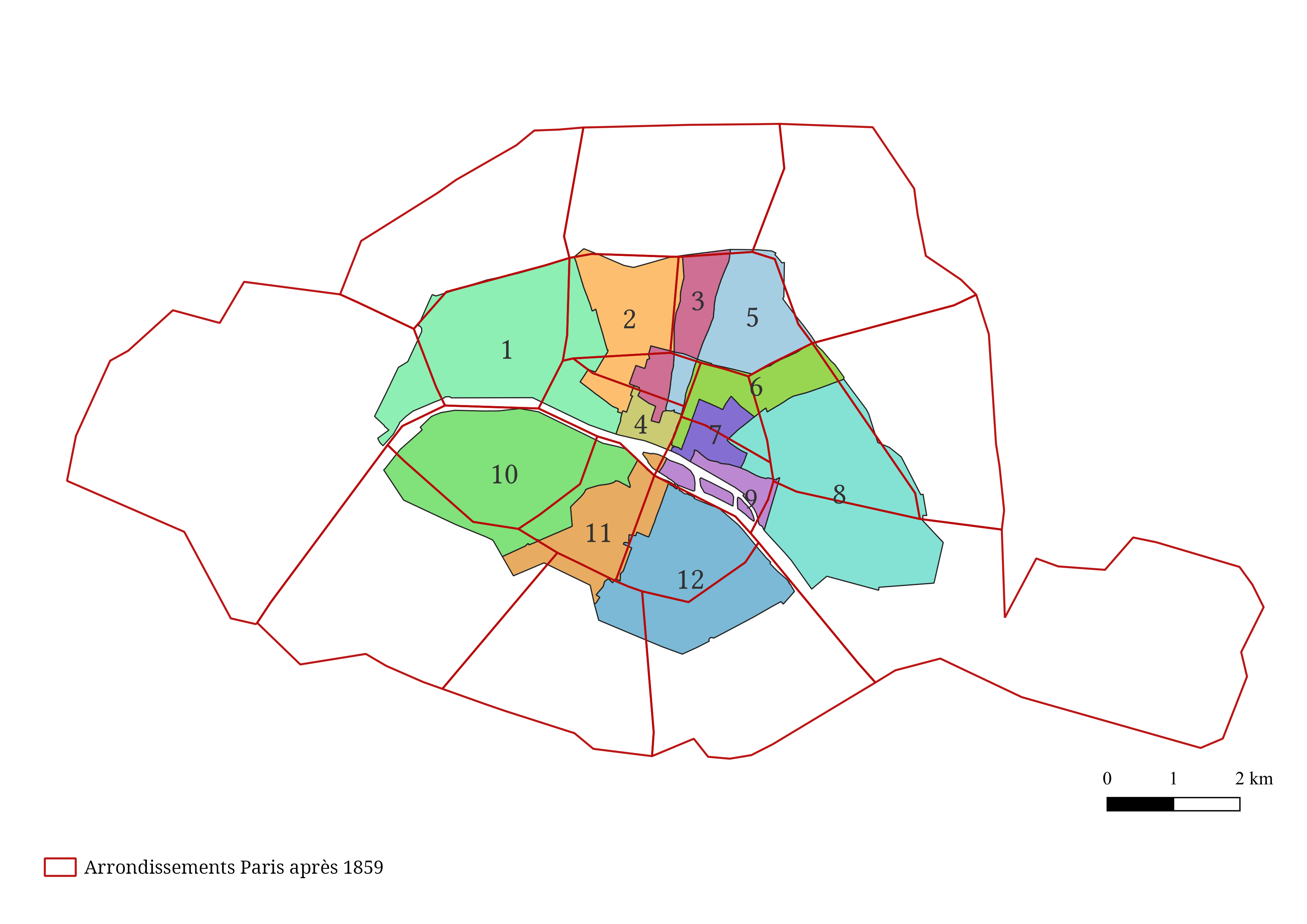
Former arrondissements superimposed over the modern ones (red).

A prefectural decree of 10 May 1811 replaced the term "section" with "quarter" in the etymological sense of the word.:

In policing terms, before 1850 the city was divided into quarters, each with a police commissariat, but given the unequal sizes of the quarters and their populations some commissariats were more overstretched than others. This critical situation made the administration decided to redivide the quarters to make them a little more equally sized. · By a decision of 27 December 1849 (coming into force on 1 April 1850) the prefect of police divided Paris into 48 sections corresponding to the 48 police commissariats. After that the 3rd, 4th, 7th and 9th arrondissements had only three sections each, the 6th, 10th, 11th and 12th arrondissements each had four, and the 1st, 2nd, 5th and 8th arrondissements had five each.

In 1860 Paris was extended to the Thiers wall, giving rise to a new division into twenty arrondissements, completely different to the twelve.

== Division into quarters ==
=== Plans ===
Plan	Date	Notes
	1797	Paris and its suburbs Twelve municipalities.
	1814	12 arrondissements and 48 quarters.
	1843	12 arrondissements and 48 quarters.
	1795-1860	12 arrondissements and 48 quarters.
	1795-1860	12 arrondissements and 48 quarters.

== "Getting married in the 13th arrondissement" ==
In 1866 Pierre Larousse included the entry

"Getting married in the 13th arrondissement" : that is to say, when Paris only has twelve arrondissements, to live as husband and wife, without having been married.

Michel Carmona also recalled that expression in «Le Paris d'Haussmann ». and Balzac used it in Béatrix ("Nobody blamed the marquis for getting married in the 13th arrondissement").

The 1859 arrondissements were numbered in the same order as their predecessors, going from north to south and west to east, starting on the Rive Droite with 12 new arrondissements and placing the remaining eight on the Rive Gauche. In the west this took in Passy and Auteuil as number 13 and the faubourg Saint-Marcel as number 20. This offended some influential inhabitants of Passy who took umbrage at being associated with the well-known saying about getting married in the 13th arrondissement. Its mayor Jean-Frédéric Possoz passed these complaints on to prefect Eugène Haussmann, asking him instead to divide up the arrondissements in a spiral starting in the city centre, a suggestion which was taken up. This meant that Passy and Auteuil became the 16th arrondissement and the title of 13th arrondissement went to a popular and undemanding area instead.

== External links (in France) ==
- Correspondance entre anciens arrondissements et nouveaux arrondissements de Paris
- Anne Varet-Vitu and Françoise Pirot, « Les administrateurs de la santé dans l’espace parisien au xixe siècle », Histoire & Mesure, no XIX, 2004, p. 377-397 (ISBN 2-7132-2052-1)
- Documents relatifs à l’extension des limites de Paris sur wikisource
- Aristide Michel Perrot : Petit atlas pittoresque des 48 quartiers de la ville de Paris
- Jean-Baptiste-Michel Renou de Chauvigné : Recherches critiques, historiques et topographiques sur la ville de Paris. Tome 1, Tome 2, Tome 3, Tome 4, Tome 5
