= French franc =

Currency of France from 1360 to 2002

franc français (French)
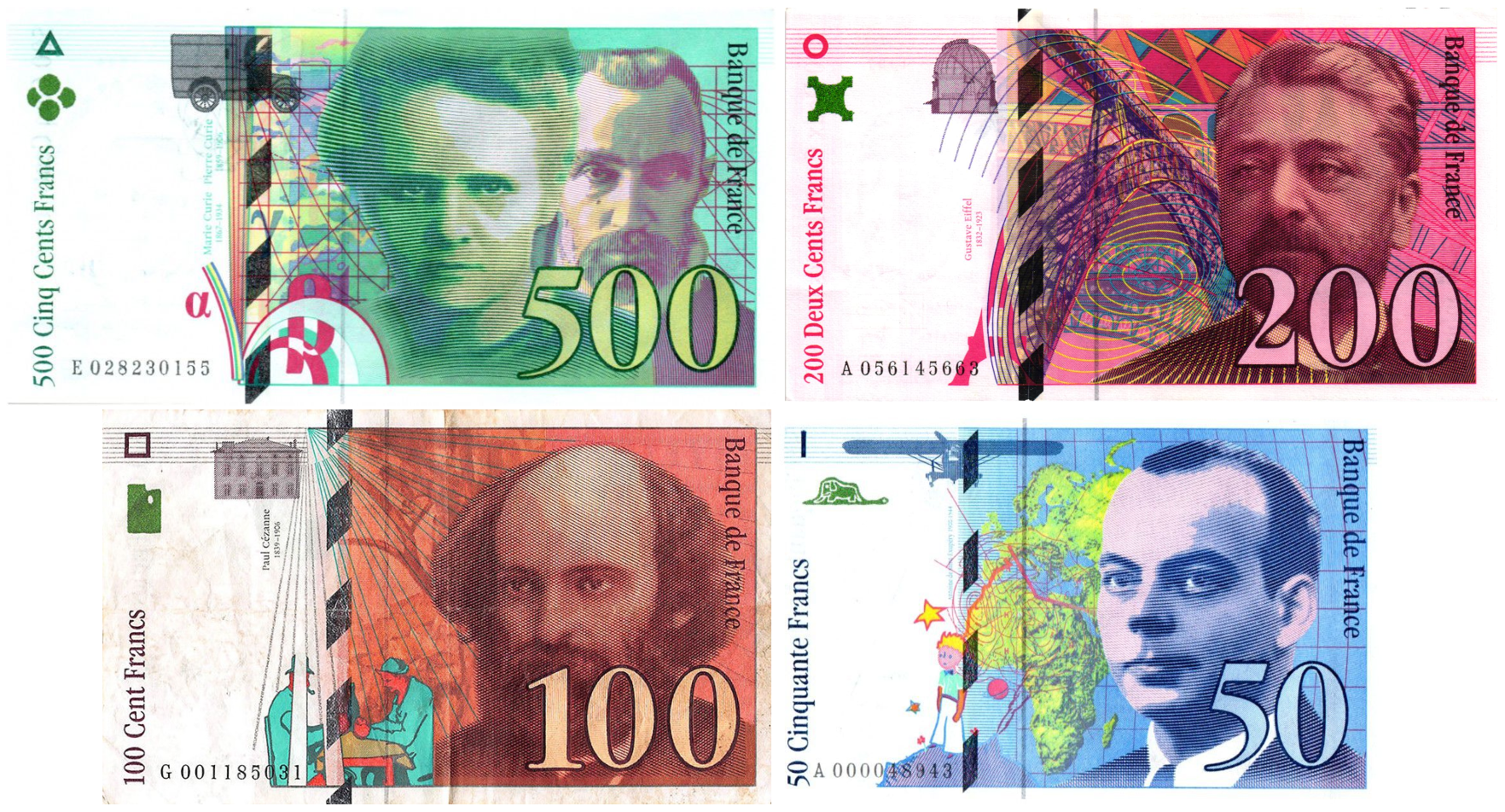
- The final series of the French franc banknotes

ISO 4217
- Code: FRF (1960–2002)

Units of account
- Base unit: franc
- Symbol: F or Fr (briefly also NF during the 1960s; also unofficially FF and ₣)
- Nickname: balles (1 F); (Note: Always used in the plural and originally in reference to the old franc, so that new francs were known as cent balles (100 old francs). Later, new francs and eventually euros came to be called balles.) sacs (10 F); bâton, brique, patate, plaque (10,000 F)
- Subunit
- 1/100: centime

Denominations
- Banknotes
- Freq. used: 20 F, 50 F, 100 F, 200 F, 500 F
- Coins
- Freq. used: 5, 10, 20 centimes, 1/2 F, 1 F, 2 F, 5 F, 10 F
- Rarely used: 1 centime, 20 F, 50 F

Demographics
- User(s): France; Monaco; Andorra

Issuance
- Central bank: Bank of France
- Website: www.banque-france.fr
- Mint: Monnaie de Paris
- Website: www.monnaiedeparis.com

Valuation
- Pegged by: KMF, XAF & XOF, XPF, ADF, MCF

EU Exchange Rate Mechanism (ERM)
- Since: 13 March 1979
- Fixed rate since: 31 December 1998
- Replaced by euro, non cash: 1 January 1999
- Replaced by euro, cash: 1 March 2002
- 1 € =: 6.55957 F
- This infobox shows the latest status before this currency was rendered obsolete.

The franc (/fræŋk/; French: franc français, [fʁɑ̃ fʁɑ̃sɛ]; sign: F or Fr), (Note: An F-with-bar or Fr ligature was encoded as U+20A3 ₣ FRENCH FRANC SIGN in the currency symbols Unicode block but was never adopted and has never been officially used. The F-with-bar symbol was proposed by Édouard Balladur, Minister of Economy, in 1988.) also commonly distinguished as the French franc (FF), was a currency of France. Between 1360 and 1641, it was the name of coins worth 1 livre tournois and it remained in common parlance as a term for this amount of money. It was reintroduced (in decimal form) in 1795. After two centuries of inflation, it was redenominated in 1960, with each new franc (NF) being worth 100 old francs. The NF designation was continued for a few years before the currency returned to being simply the franc. Many French residents, though, continued to quote prices of especially expensive items in terms of the old franc (equivalent to the new centime), up to and even after the introduction of the euro (for coins and banknotes) in 2002. The French franc was a commonly held international reserve currency of reference in the 19th and 20th centuries. Between 1998 and 2002, the conversion of francs to euros was carried out at a rate of 6.55957 francs to 1 euro.

== History ==
The French franc traces its origins to the Carolingian monetary system of the 8th century AD, and more specifically to the livre tournois, an offshoot of the same system which emerged in the 13th century. Here is a table of changes to the value of the livre parisis and the livre tournois in terms of silver or gold until the French franc was introduced in 1795.

Historical values of the livres parisis and tournois, grams of precious metal
Year	Livre parisis		Livre tournois	
Year	g silver	g gold	g silver	g gold
AD 781	407.92	—	—	—
c. 1000	305.94	—	—	—
1266	—	—	80.88	—
1317	80.88	—	64.70	—
1361	55.85	4.856	44.68	3.885
1425	38.243	3.585	30.594	2.868
1475	30.594	2.620	24.475	2.096
1549	20.396	1.747	16.317	1.398
1641	—	—	8.309	0.6189
1726	—	—	4.505	0.3116
1785	—	—	4.444	0.2867
franc	—	—	4.500	0.2903

=== Carolingian, 781 ===
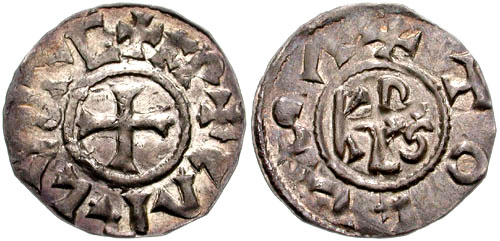
Denier of Charlemagne c. 800

Emperor Charlemagne's monetary system was introduced in 781 AD to the Frankish Carolingian Empire and spread over the centuries to much of Western Europe, with a Livre (pound) of silver divided into 20 sols or sous (shillings) and the sol divided into 12 deniers (pennies). Only the denier existed as a coin for the next 500 years, with the sou and livre functioning as accounting multiples of the denier. The first livre and denier weighed 407.92 g and 1.7 g, respectively, of the finest silver available.

=== Capetian, c. 1000 ===
Livres and deniers issued c. 1000 under the Capetian dynasty contained 305.94 g and 1.27475 g fine silver, respectively. The French mark of 8 ounces was a unit of weight equal to 244.752 grams, and equal in weight to 192 deniers or 16 sols of this period.

In subsequent centuries the French kings would struggle to implement fixed standards for the livre over a decentralized realm of Frankish feudal rulers, many of whom claimed the right to issue currency within their own domains, and often resorting to currency debasements in moments of stringency. While monetary values as proclaimed by French kings would eventually be identified as the livre parisis, other regions almost always got by with currencies of lower standard. One such currency, the livre tournois, would eventually become the preferred accounting system under a more centralized French kingdom.

=== Louis IX, 1266 ===
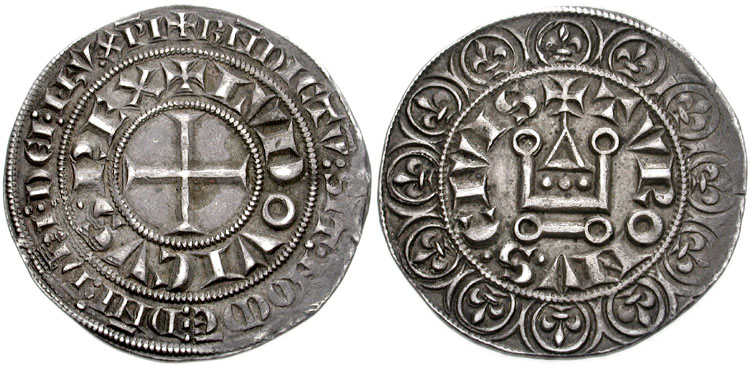
Gros tournois of Louis IX, 1266

The emergence of the livre tournois as France's preferred accounting system occurred during the reign of King Louis IX with the issuance of the silver gros tournois with 58 issued to a French mark of silver of fineness 23/24 (hence 4.044 g fine silver in a gros), and valued at 1 sol (12 deniers) in France's Touraine region, though valued less than 1 sol parisis. The new coin's reputation and handling convenience versus those of debased deniers assured the adoption of the gros tournois to the rest of Western Europe.

=== Late Capetian, 1317 ===
Towards the reign of King Philip IV le Bel came pressures to further debase the denier, which occurred in 1317 when the gros tournois was raised to 15 deniers tournois or 12 deniers (1 sol) parisis, thus commencing the fixed parity of 4 deniers parisis to 5 deniers tournois. While French kings would continue to prescribe coin values in multiples of 4 and 12 deniers parisis until the end of the 15th century, the rest of France would gradually choose to recognize their increased values in multiples of 5 and 15 deniers tournois.

=== Hundred Years' War, 1361 ===
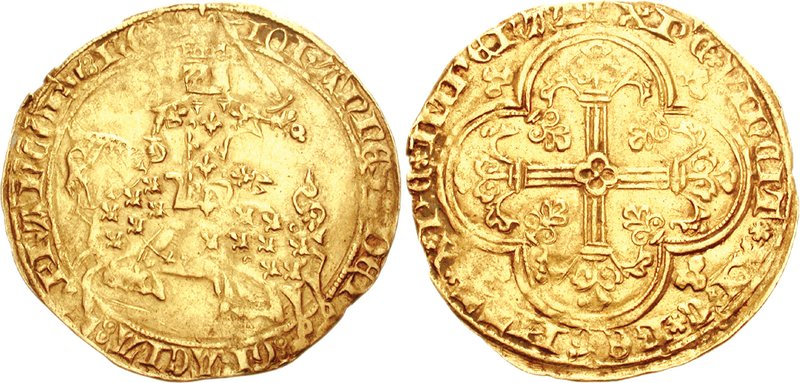
Franc à cheval

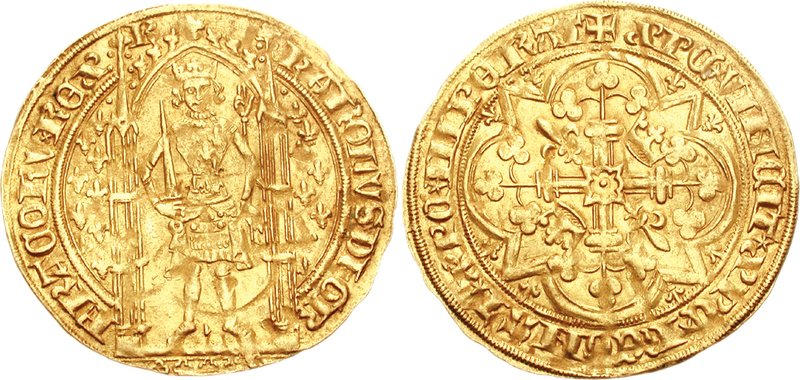
Franc à pied

The start of the Hundred Years' War against England in 1337 would increase the pressure to further debase the French livre. An attempt in 1343 to reverse earlier depreciations of circulating deniers and reinstate the old 1317-era gros tournois (forte monnaie, or strong money) caused financial havoc especially with borrowers who received depreciated coins and who then had to repay debts in forte monnaie. Lower valuations for the livre had to be accepted subsequently as the war raged on.

In 1361 the gros tournois of 15 deniers tournois (1 sol parisis) was minted at 84 to a French Mark of silver, 23/24 fine (hence, 2.79 fine silver in a gros). At the same time gold flowing from Southern Europe started to become an important medium of exchange in the North, so gold francs worth 1 livre tournois (16 sols parisis) were minted at 63 to a French mark of fine gold (hence, 3.885 g in a franc). Gold as circulating currency would henceforth continue in the form of écus d'or of varying gold content.

The gold franc worth one livre tournois was introduced in 1360 to pay the ransom of King John II of France. This coin secured the king's freedom and showed him on a richly decorated horse earning it the name franc à cheval (meaning "free on horseback" in French). The obverse legend, like other French coins, gives the king's title as Francorum Rex ("King of the Franks" in Latin) and provides another reason to call the coin a franc. John's son, Charles V, continued this type. It was copied exactly at Brabant and Cambrai and, with the arms on the horse cloth changed, at Flanders. Conquests led by Joan of Arc allowed Charles VII to return to sound coinage and he revived the franc à cheval. John II, however, was not able to strike enough francs to pay his ransom and he voluntarily returned to English captivity.

John II died as a prisoner in England and his son Charles V was left to pick up the pieces. Charles V pursued a policy of reform, including stable coinage. An edict dated 20 April 1365 established the centrepiece of this policy, a gold coin officially called the denier d'or aux fleurs de lis which had a standing figure of the king on its obverse, pictured under a canopy. Its value in money of account was one livre tournois, just like the franc à cheval, and this coin is universally known as a franc à pied ('free on foot'). In accordance with the theories of the mathematician, economist and royal advisor Nicole Oresme, Charles struck fewer coins of better quality gold than his ancestors. In the accompanying deflation, both prices and wages fell, but wages fell faster and debtors had to settle up in better money than they had borrowed. The Mayor of Paris, Étienne Marcel, exploited their discontent to lead the Jacquerie revolt which forced Charles V out of the city. The franc fared better. It became associated with money stable at one livre tournois.

=== Lancastrian War, 1425 ===
A certain degree of peace achieved at the start of the 15th century helped settle the value of French currency. After 1422 the gros of 1 sol parisis was minted at 96 to a French mark, 3/4 fine (hence 1.912 g per gros), while the écu of 20 sols parisis was minted at 64 to a French mark, 22 1/2 karats or 15/16 fine (hence 3.585 g per écu). The gros and the écu compared favourably with England's 2-pence coin of 1.8 g silver and 40-pence (1/6th of a pound) half-noble coin of 3.48 g gold, resulting in an approximate exchange rate of 1 pound sterling to six livres parisis.

Peace in the Burgundian Netherlands after the 1420s also resulted in the 1434 realignment of the Flemish monetary system with the French livre. The new Flemish guilder (pound) of 20 stuiver (shilling) contained 32.6 g fine silver and was approximately par with the Livre Parisis of 20 sols (38.24 g). Such parities between the French livres to the Flemish and English currencies would persist up to the 1560s and would facilitate the issue of identical coin denominations across these countries.

=== Louis XI, 1475 ===
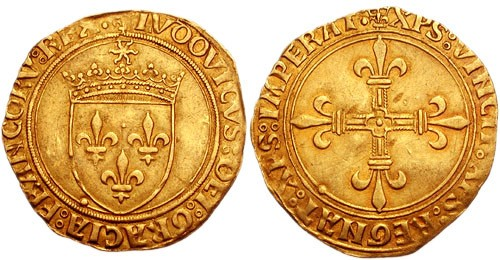
Écu au soleil of Louis XII

The Great Bullion Famine of the mid-15th century resulted in yet another debasement during the reign of King Louis XI, with the livre parisis reduced to 1 French ounce (30.594 g) fine silver or 2.620 g fine gold. The silver gros was minted at 69 to the French mark, 23/24 fine (3.4 g fine silver) and was valued at 1/9th the Livre Parisis (or 2 2/9 sols). The gold Écu au soleil was minted at 72 to the mark, 23 1/8 karats fine (3.2754 g fine gold), and was valued at 25 sols parisis. The close of the 15th century saw the beginnings of a more centralized French currency system and the discontinuation of competing currency systems within France.

The livre parisis of 1 French ounce approximately matched the silver content of 1/6th pound sterling (1 troy ounce of sterling silver). It would also become the model for the Holy Roman Empire when its prince-electors started issuing the 1-ounce silver Guldengroschen divided into 21 Groschen (gros, shillings) or 252 Pfennige (pence).

=== Valois-Angoulême, 1549 ===
A considerable acceleration in the debasement of the French, English and Dutch currencies occurred during the reign of the Valois-Angoulême kings in the 16th century amidst the huge influx of precious metals from the American continent arriving through the Habsburg Netherlands. The loose enforcement of monetary standards in the Dutch provinces resulted in a significant 1/3rd reduction in the value of the French livre by 1549, with debasements continuing into the 17th century.

The French ounce (30.594 g) of fine silver was raised in value from 1 to 1 1/2 livre parisis (or from 25 to 37 1/2 sols tournois). The Écu au soleil of 3.2754 g fine gold was raised in value from 25 to 37 1/2 sols parisis (or 31 1/4 to approximately 47 sols tournois). This 50% advance was also seen in England in 1551 when it raised its troy ounce of sterling silver from 40 to 60 pence, and in the 17th century when the Holy Roman Empire raised its one-ounce silver thaler from 1 to 1 1/2 silver gulden.

The 16th century saw the issuance of larger silver coins, first in testoons (9 g fine silver, valued at 11 sols Tournois in 1549), and later on in silver francs (12.3 g fine silver, valued at 1 livre tournois in 1577). These French coins, however, were much less popular than the 1-ounce silver coins coming out of Spain, the Netherlands and the Holy Roman Empire, leading to the 1641 currency reform under King Louis XIII.

Henry III exploited the association of the franc as sound money worth one livre tournois when he sought to stabilize French currency in 1577. By this time, inflows of gold and silver from Spanish America had caused inflation throughout the world economy and the kings of France, who were not getting much of this wealth, only made things worse by manipulating the values assigned to their coins. The States General which met at Blois in 1577 added to the public pressure to stop currency manipulation. Henry III agreed to do this and he revived the franc, now as a silver coin valued at one livre tournois. This coin and its fractions circulated until 1641 when Louis XIII replaced it with the silver écu. Nevertheless, the name "franc" continued in accounting as a synonym for the livre tournois.

=== Louis XIII, 1641 ===
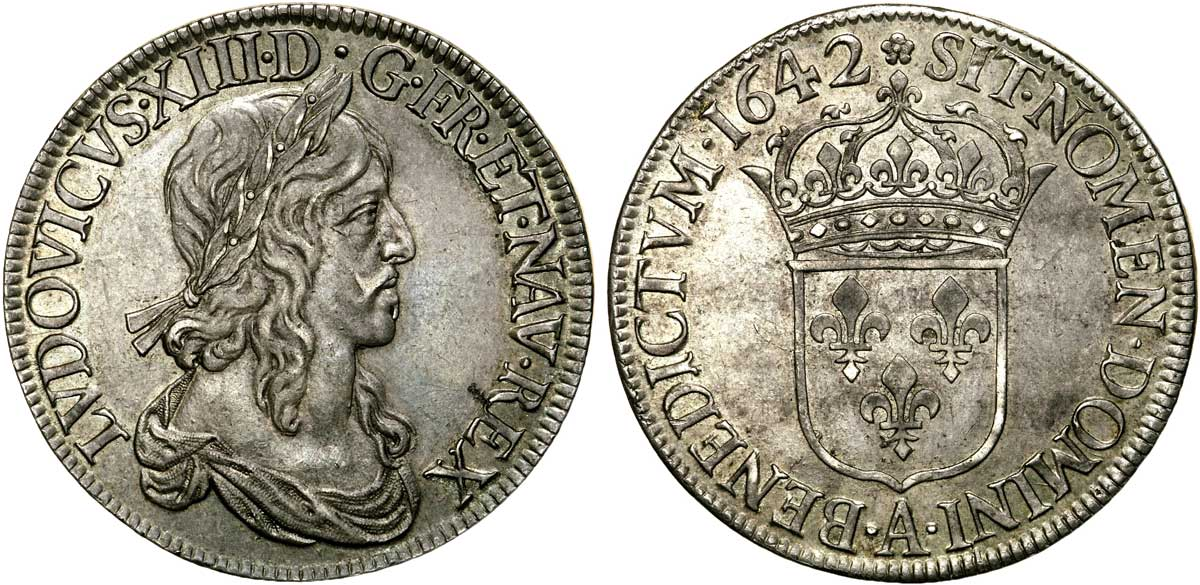
Louis d'argent of Louis XIII, 1642

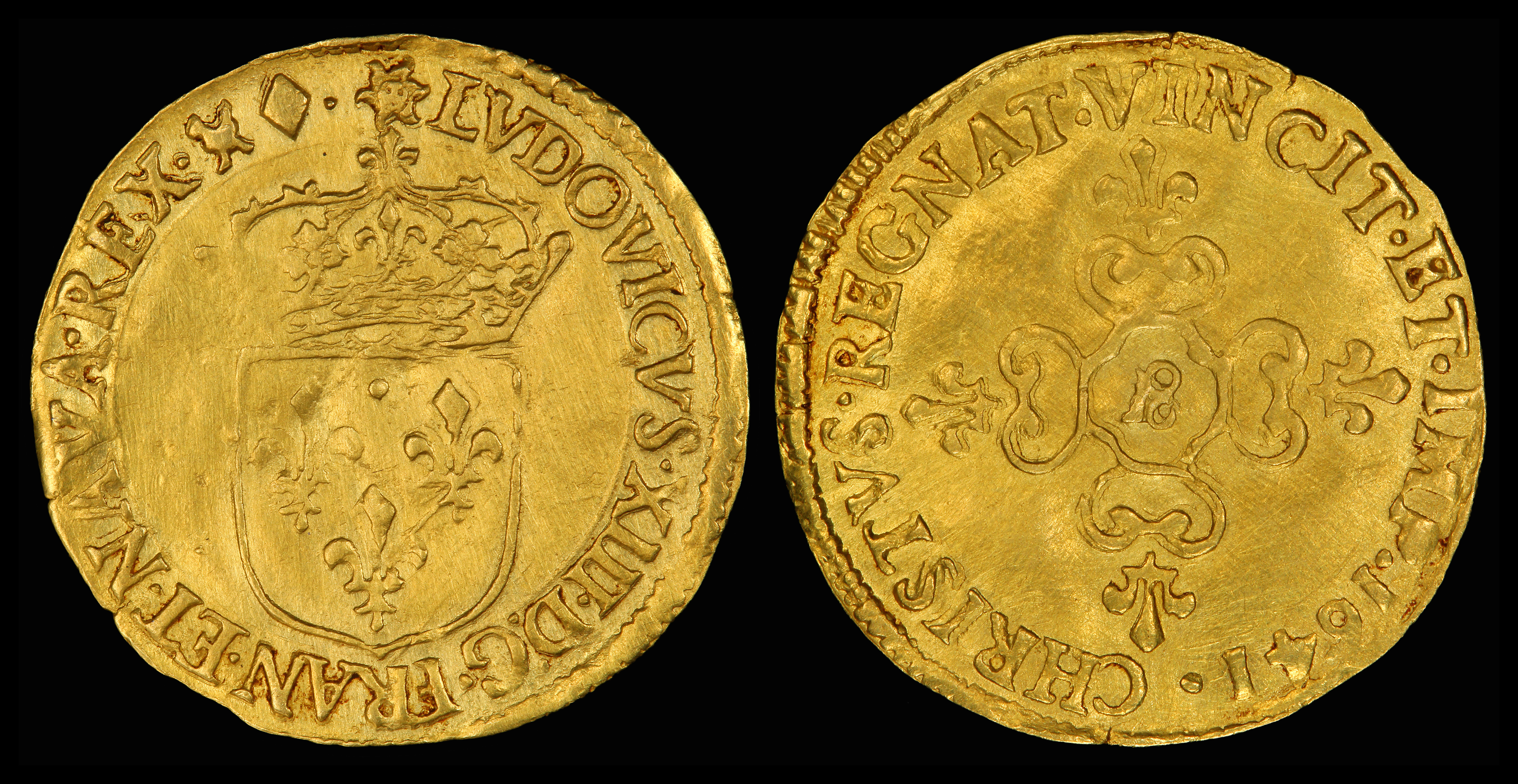
Louis d'or of Louis XIII, 1641

In the 17th century King Louis XIII abolished its unpopular coinage of francs and ecus in favour of Spanish-modelled coins. It also abolished the livre parisis system in favour of exclusive use of the livre tournois. The Spanish dollar was the model for the Louis d'argent – 9 to a French mark (244.752 g) of silver, 11/12 fine (hence 24.93 g fine silver), and valued at 3 livres tournois. The Spanish doubloon or two-escudo coin was the model for the Louis d'or – 36 1/4 to a French mark of gold, 11/12 fine (hence 6.189 g fine gold), and valued at 10 livres.

=== Louis XV, 1726 ===
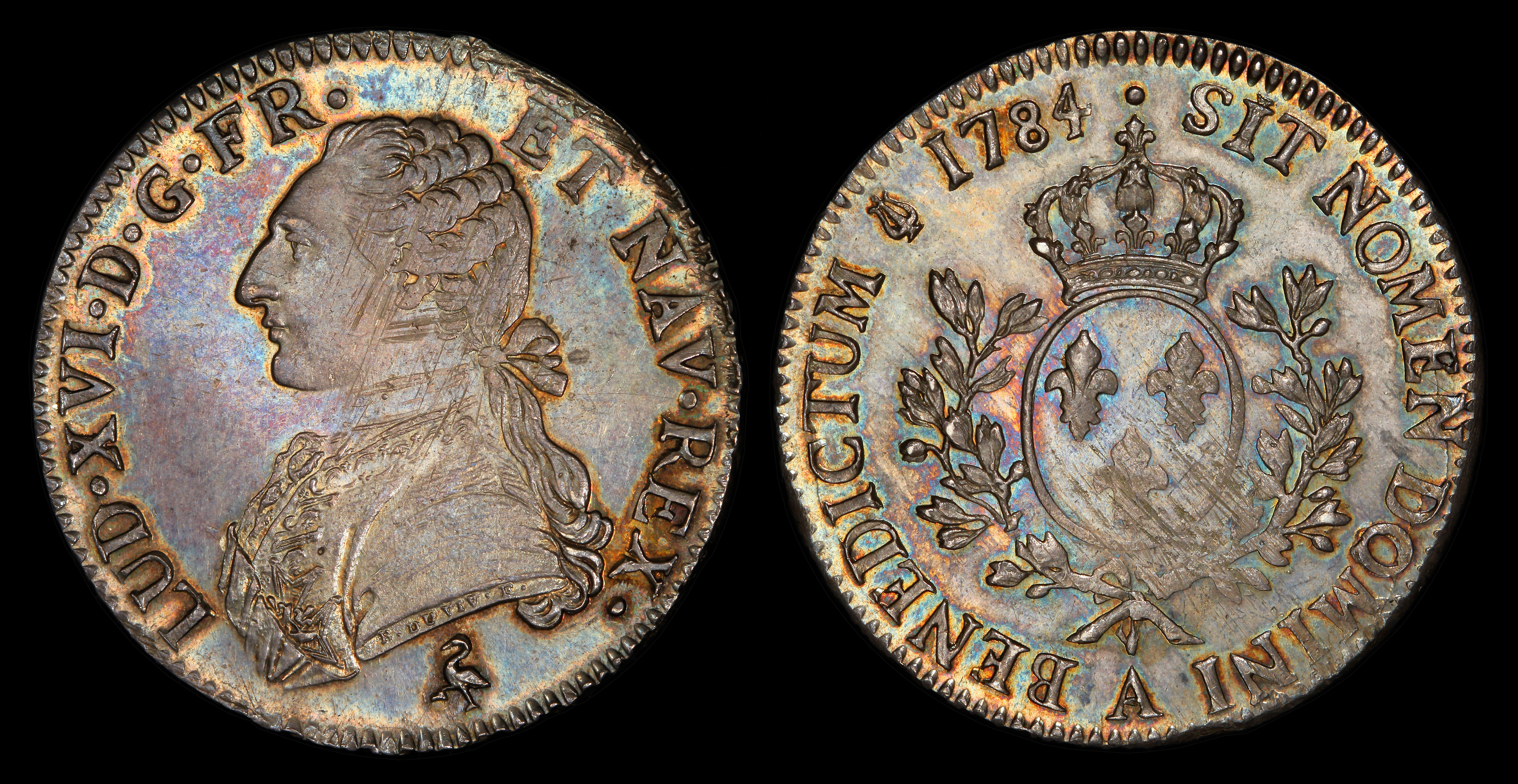
Ecu of Louis XVI, 1784

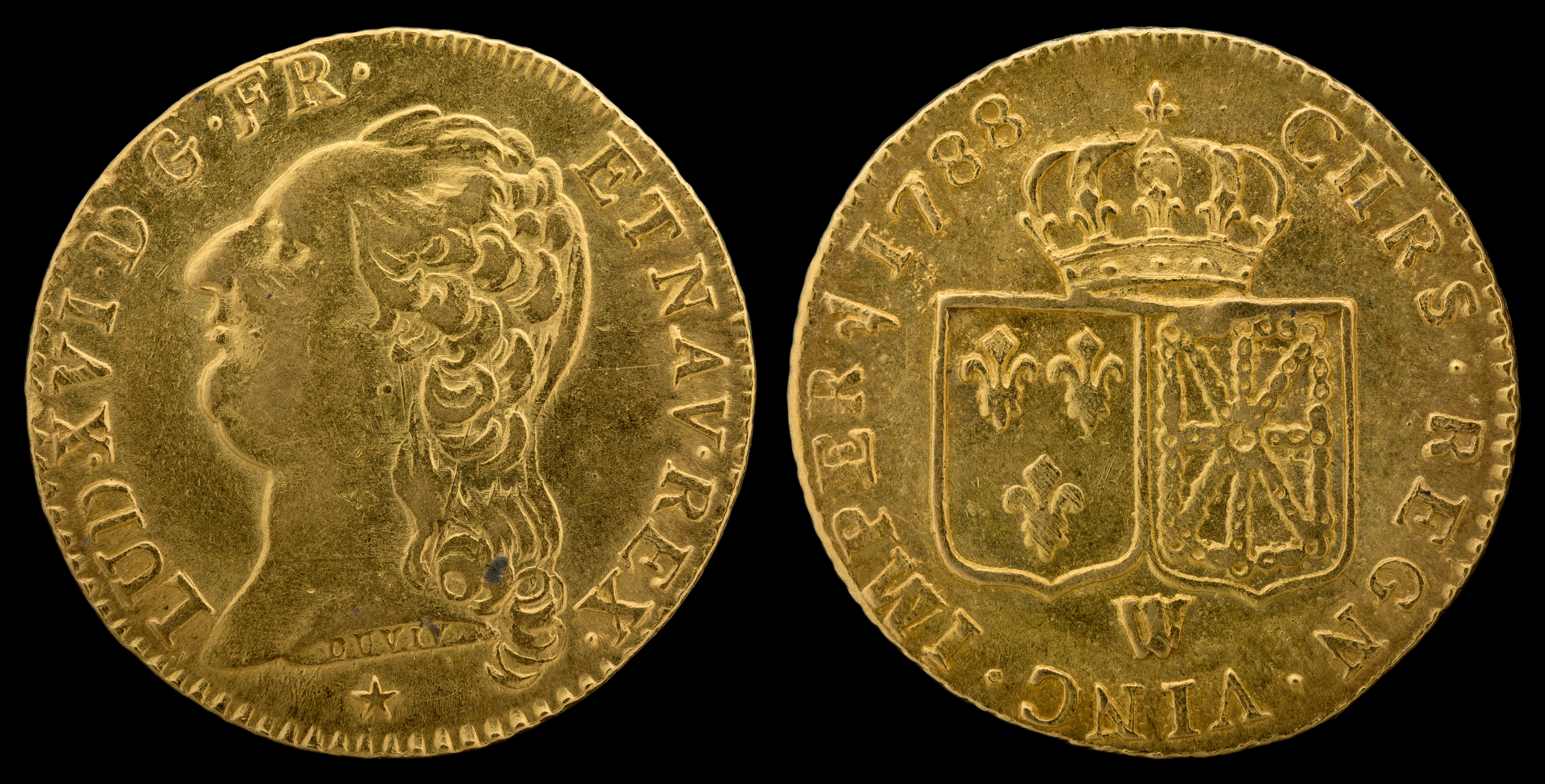
Louis d'or of 24 livres, 1788

France entered another turbulent period during the War of the Spanish Succession from 1701 to 1714, resulting in another debasement of the livre tournois. Under King Louis XV's reign in 1726 the silver écu d'argent was issued at 8.3 to a mark of silver, 11/12 fine (hence 27.03 g fine silver), and valued at 6 livres. A new gold Louis d'or was also issued at 30 to a mark of gold, 11/12 fine (hence 7.4785 g fine gold), and valued at 24 livres.

=== Louis XVI, 1785 ===
The rise in the value of gold at the onset of the Industrial Revolution in Great Britain and elsewhere as well as King Louis XVI's reign led to the rise in the gold–silver ratio to 15.5, resulting in the reduction in the gold content of the 24-livre Louis d'or from 1/30 to 1/32 of a mark, 11/12 fine. While the silver standard remained unchanged, assays of the period indicate that coins contained approximately 1.5% less bullion than officially specified. The 1795 swapping of livres to francs at the rate of 1.0125 livres = 1 franc suggest that the 6-livre ecu contained 26.67 g fine silver while the reduced 24-livre Louis contained 6.88 g fine gold.

The livre tournois was swapped in 1795 for the French franc (or franc germinal), worth 4.5 g silver or 9/31 g = 0.29032 g gold (ratio 15.5), at a rate of 1 franc = 1 1/80 livres or 1 livre, 3 deniers.

=== French Revolution ===
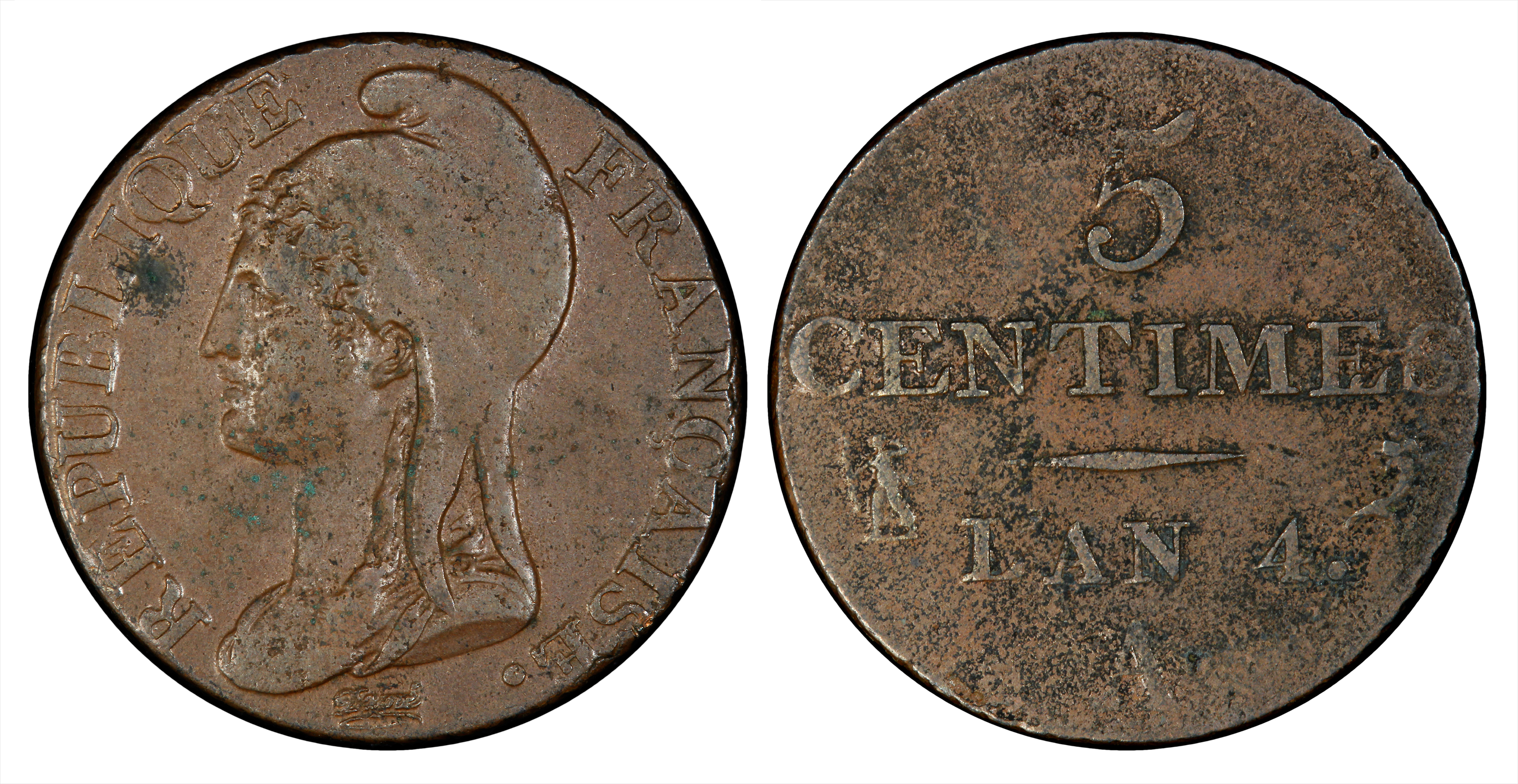
1795 five centime coin, the first year of decimal fractions for the franc

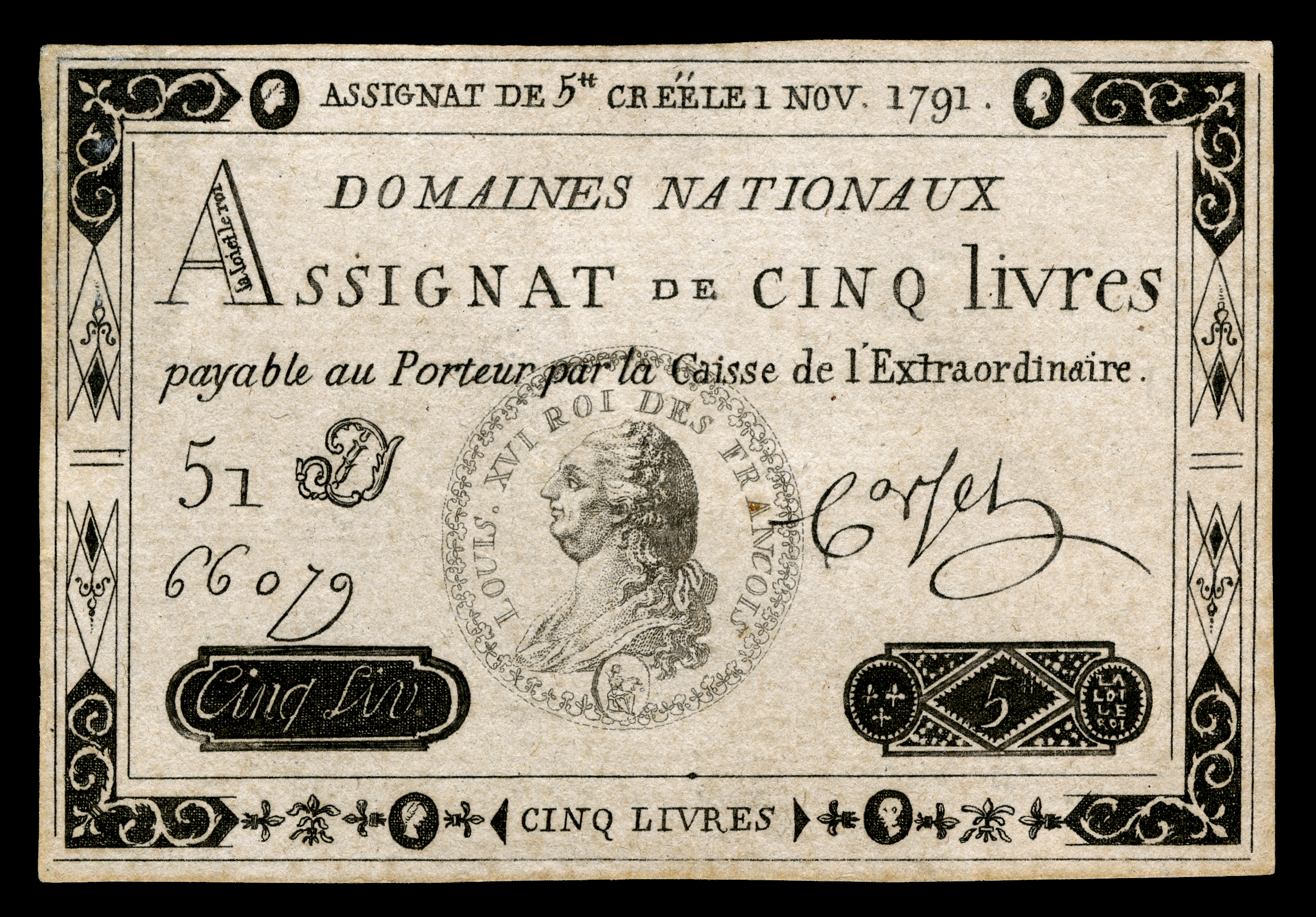
An Assignat for 5 livres (1791)

1799 two-decimes essai coin
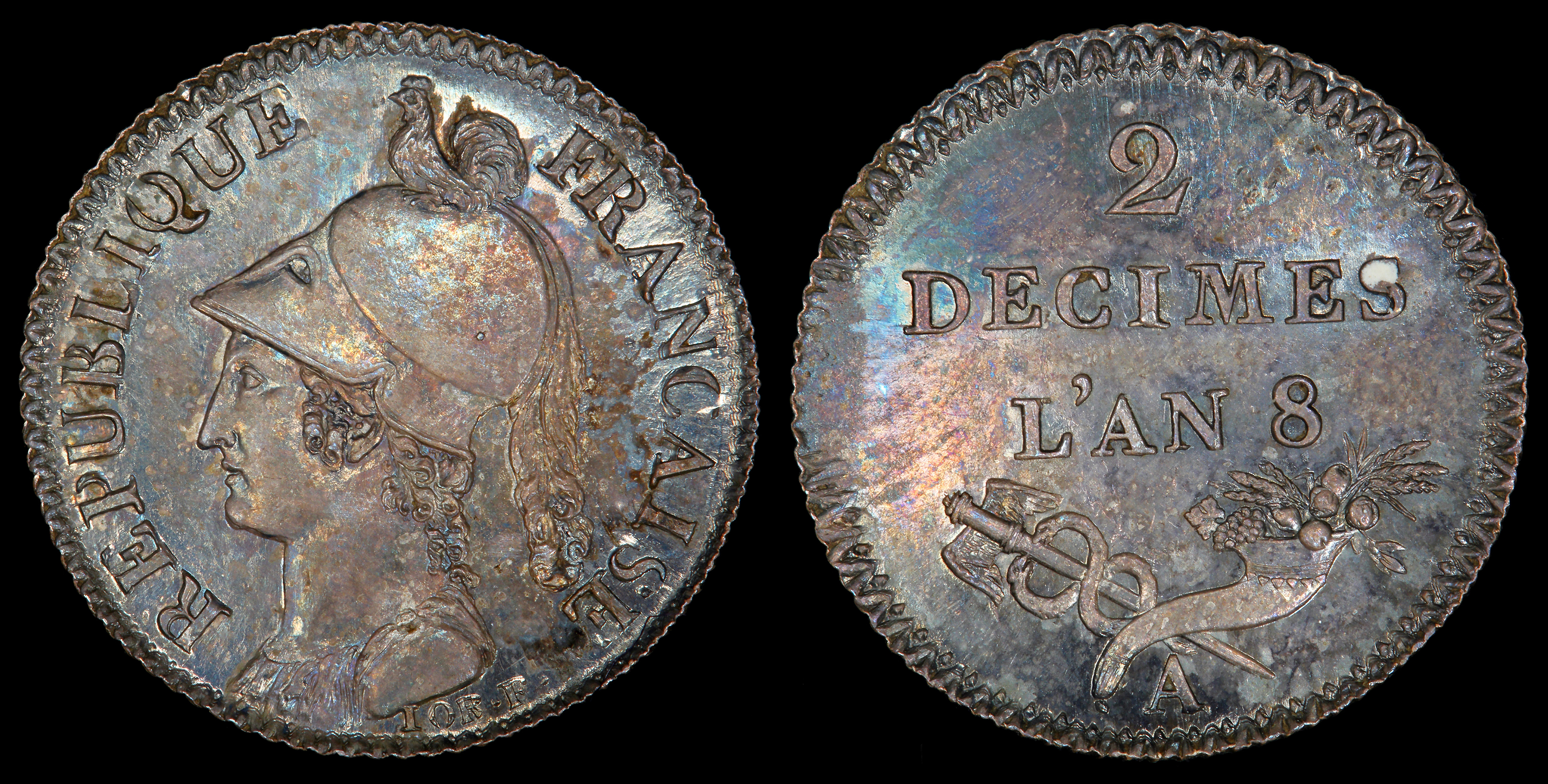
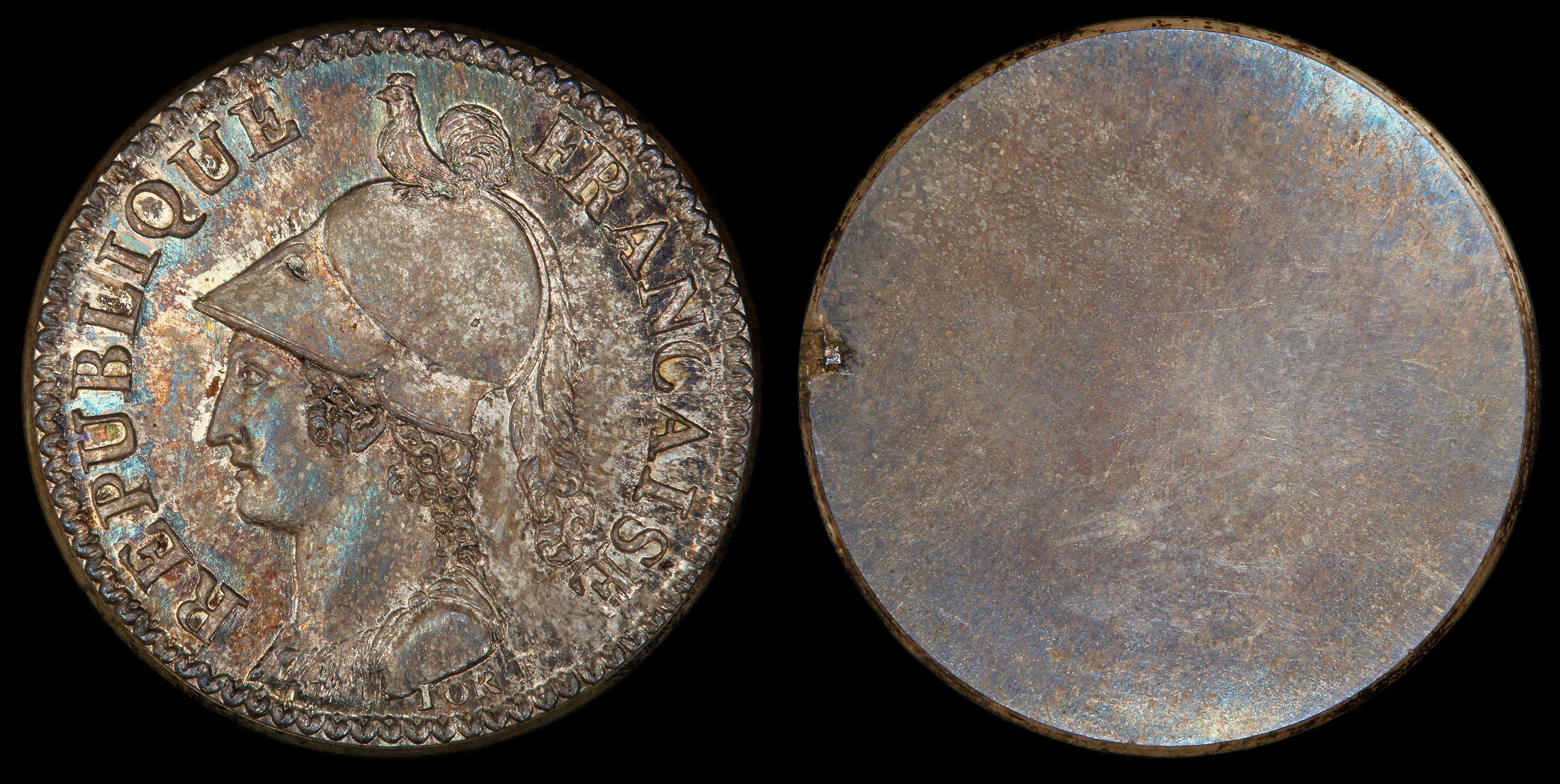
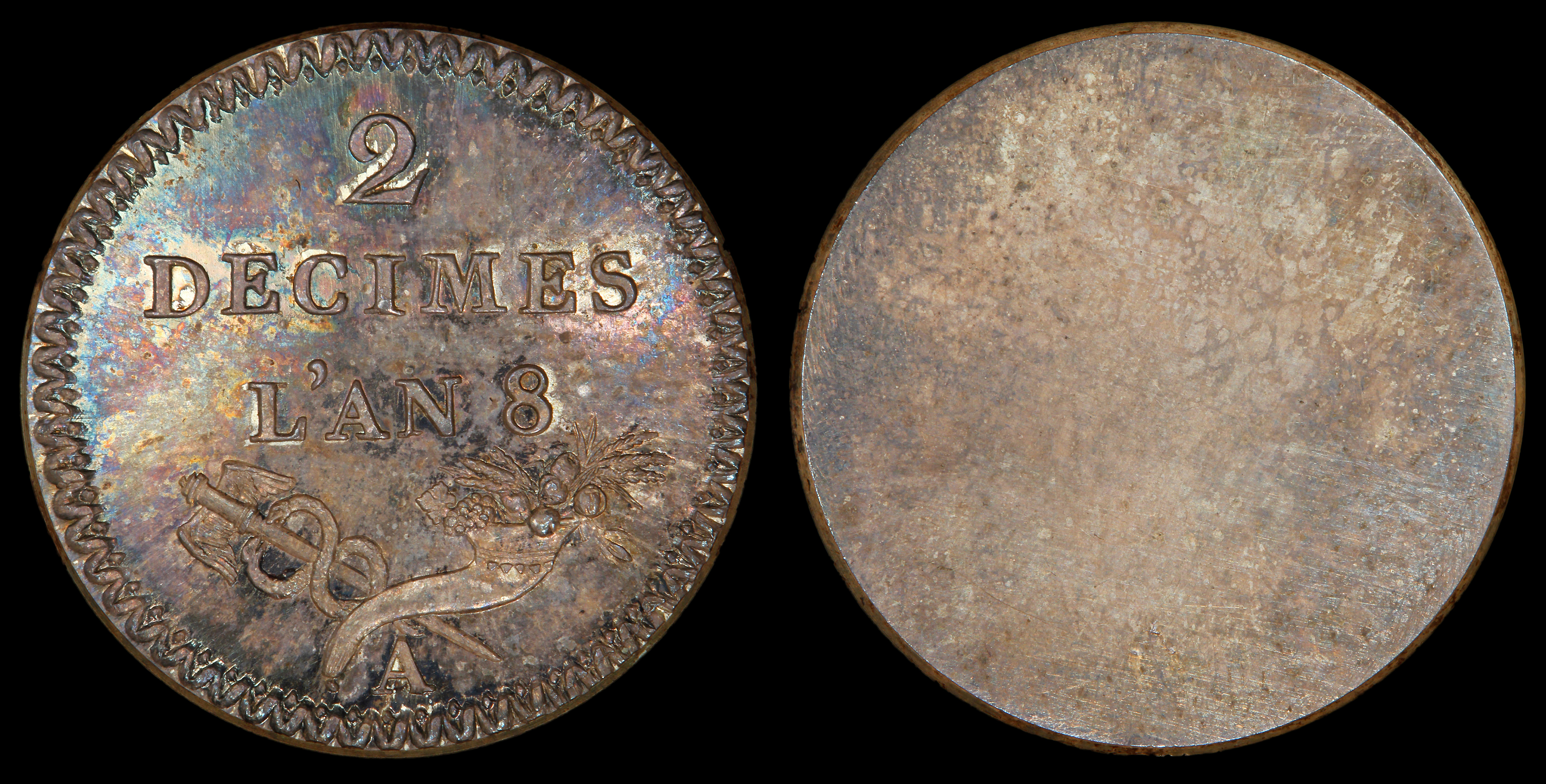
Three separate strikes of the proposed two-decimes coin (not adopted)

The decimal "franc" was established as the national currency by the National Convention of Revolutionary France in 1795 as a decimal unit (1 franc = 10 décimes = 100 centimes) of 4.5 g of fine silver. This was slightly less than the livre of 4.505 g, but the franc was set in 1796 at 1.0125 livres (1 livre, 3 deniers), reflecting in part the past minting of sub-standard coins. Silver coins now had their denomination clearly marked as "5 FRANCS" and it was made obligatory to quote prices in francs. This ended the Ancien Régime's practice of striking coins with no stated denomination, such as the Louis d'or, and periodically issuing royal edicts to manipulate their value in terms of money of account, i.e. the livre tournois. The franc became the official currency of France in 1799.

Coinage with explicit denominations in decimal fractions of the franc also began in 1795. Decimalization of the franc was mandated by an act of 7 April 1795, which also dealt with the decimalization of weights and measures. France led the world in adopting the metric system and it was the second country to convert from a non-decimal to a decimal currency, following Russia's conversion in 1704, and the third country to adopt a decimal coinage, also following the United States in 1787. France's first decimal coinage used allegorical figures symbolizing revolutionary principles, like the coinage designs the United States had adopted in 1793.

The circulation of this metallic currency declined during the Republic: the old gold and silver coins were taken out of circulation and exchanged for printed assignats, initially issued as bonds backed by the value of the confiscated goods of churches, but later declared as Legal tender currency. The withdrawn gold and silver coins were used to finance the French Revolutionary Wars and to import food, which was in short supply.

As during the "Mississippi Bubble" in 1715–1720, too many assignats were put in circulation, exceeding the value of the "national properties", and the coins, due also to military requisitioning and hoarding, rarefied to pay foreign suppliers. With national government debt remaining unpaid, and a shortage of silver and brass to mint coins, confidence in the new currency declined, leading to hyperinflation, more food riots, severe political instability and termination of the French First Republic and the political fall of the French Convention. Then followed the economic failure of the Directory: coins were still very rare. After a coup d'état that led to the Consulate, the First Consul progressively acquired sole legislative power at the expense of the other unstable and discredited consultative and legislative institutions.

=== French Empire and Restoration ===
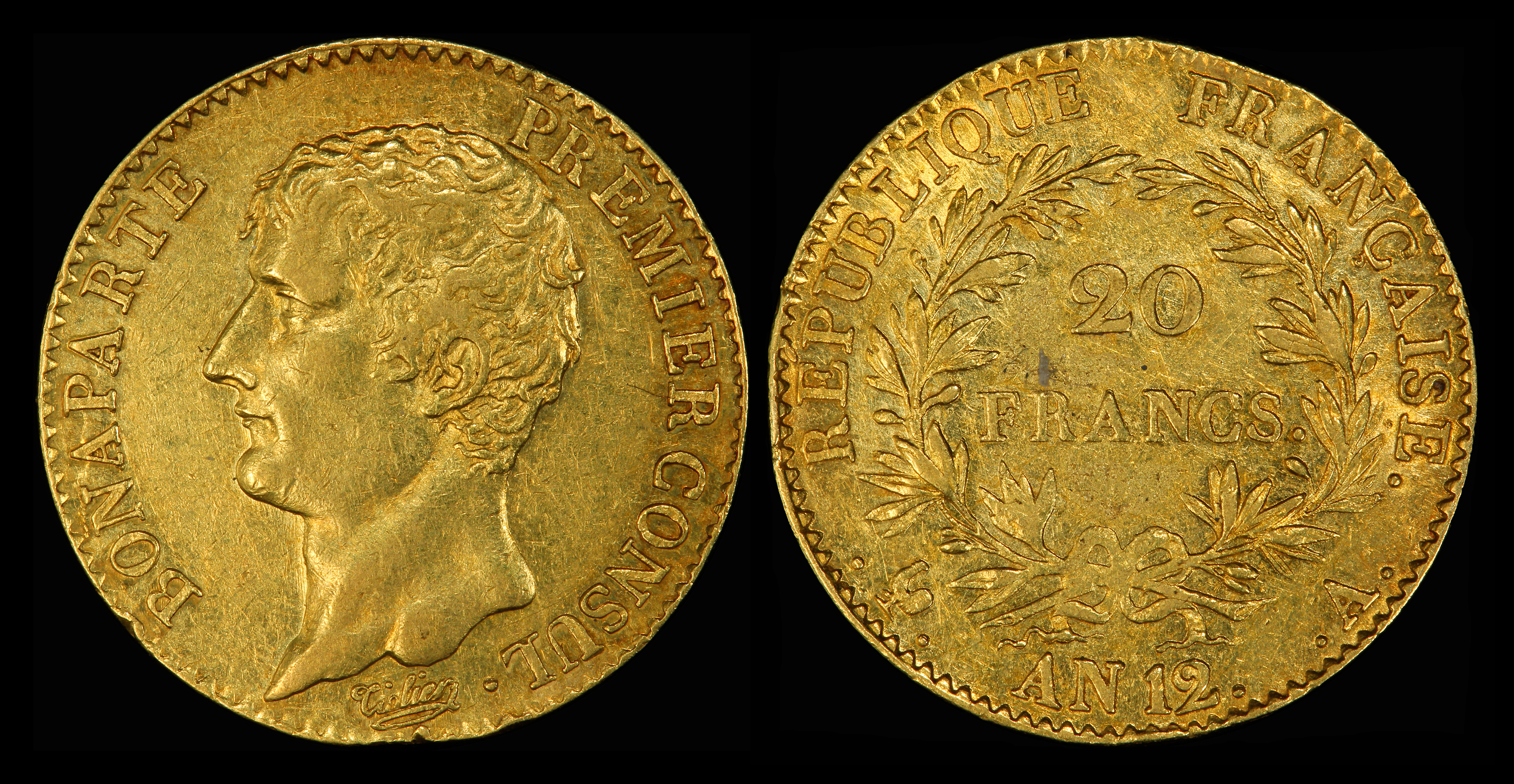
20 gold francs coin of 1803, depicting Napoleon as First Consul
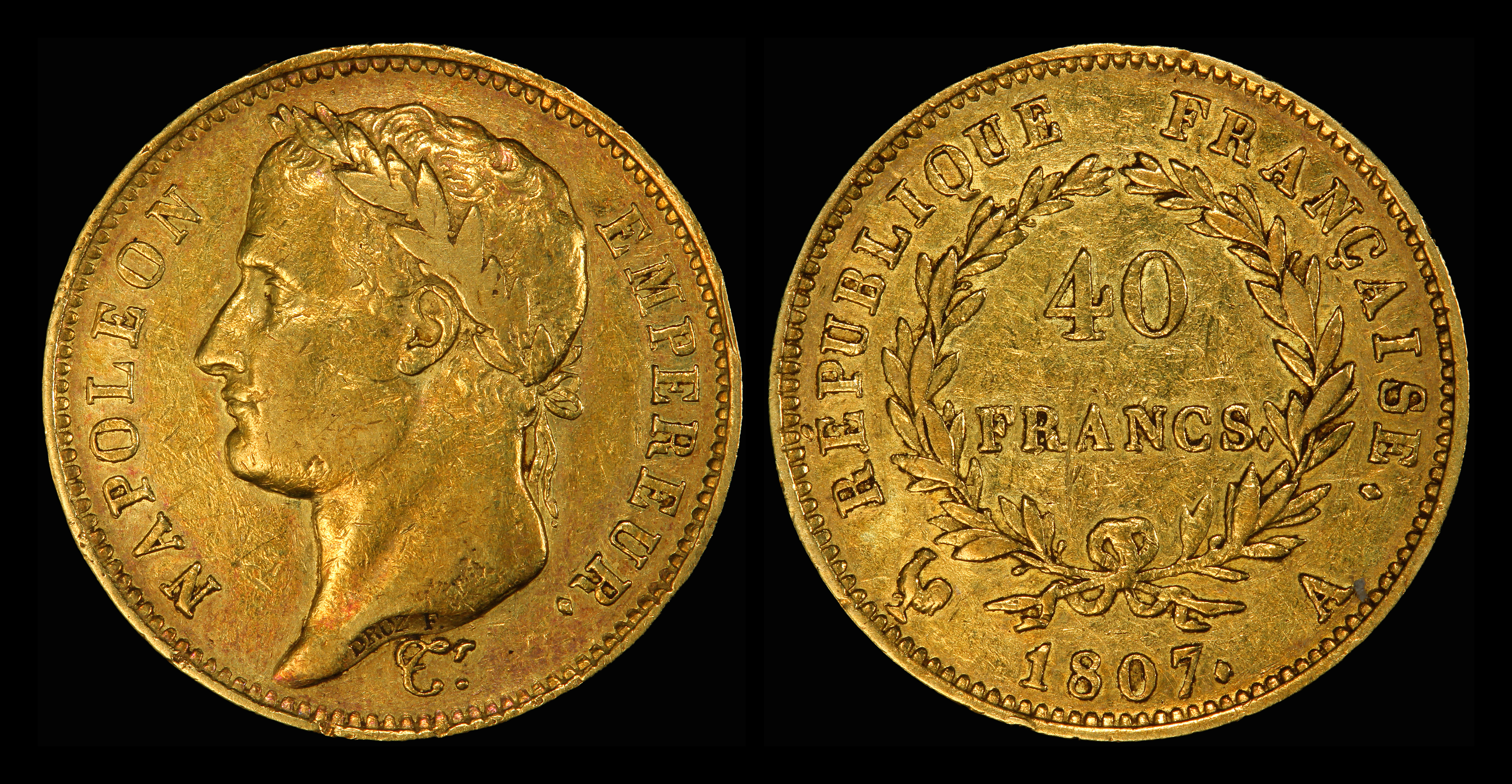
40 gold francs coin of 1806, now depicting Napoleon as Emperor

In 1800 the Banque de France, a federal establishment with a private board of executives, was created and commissioned to produce the national currency. In 1803, the franc Germinal (named after the month Germinal in the revolutionary calendar) was established, creating a gold franc containing 290.32 mg of fine gold. From this point, gold and silver-based units circulated interchangeably on the basis of a 1:15.5 ratio between the values of the two metals (bimetallism) until 1864, when all silver coins except the 5-franc piece were debased from 900 ‰ to 835 ‰ silver without the weights changing.

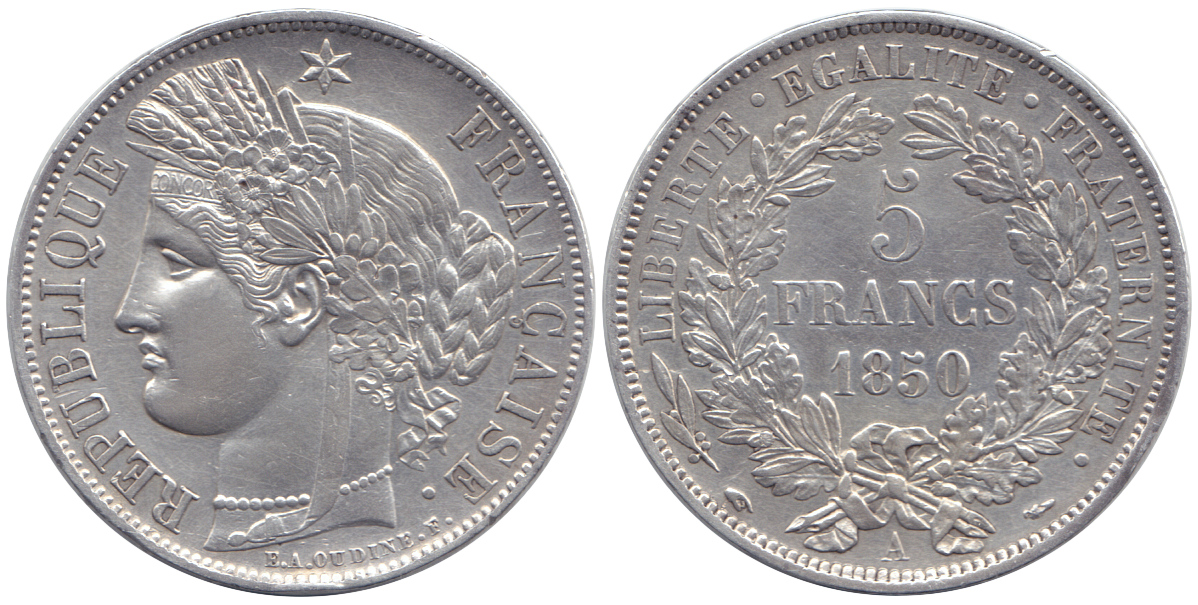
5 francs, 1850. French Second Republic. 900 fine silver.

This coinage included the first modern gold coins with denominations in francs. It abandoned the revolutionary symbols of the coinage 1795, now showing Napoleon in the manner of Roman emperors, first described as "Bonaparte Premier Consul" and with the country named as "République Française". After his coronation in 1804 coins changed the obverse legend to "Napoléon Empereur", dropping his family name in the manner of regnal names. In 1807, the reverse legend changed to name France as "Empire Français". In analogy with the old Louis d'or these coins were called gold Napoleons. Economically, this sound money was a great success and Napoleon's fall did not change that. Succeeding governments maintained Napoleon's weight standard, with changes in design which traced the political history of France. In particular, this currency system was retained during the Bourbon Restoration and perpetuated until 1914.

=== Latin Monetary Union ===
France was a founding member of the Latin Monetary Union (LMU), a single currency employed primarily by the Romance-speaking and other Mediterranean states between 1865 and the First World War. The common currency was based on the franc germinal, with the name franc already being used in Switzerland and Belgium, whilst other countries minted local denominations, redeemable across the bloc with 1-to-1 parity, though with local names: e.g., the peseta. In 1873, the LMU went over to a purely gold standard of 1 franc = 0.290322581 grams of gold.

=== World War I ===
50 centimes

The value of the old French franc, in 2007 euros. Years shaded in gold indicate fixing to the gold standard.

The outbreak of World War I caused France to leave the gold standard of the LMU. The war severely undermined the franc's strength: war expenditure, inflation and postwar reconstruction, financed partly by printing ever more money, reduced the franc's purchasing power by 70% between 1915 and 1920. After a brief appreciation of the franc during the Depression of 1920–1921, it depreciated a further 43% between 1922 and a balancing of the budget in 1926. This devaluation was aggravated by the insistence of the Republican U.S. federal government and World War Foreign Debts Commission that France's war debts be repaid within 25 years at a minimal 4.25 percent interest per year. The currency devaluation contributed to French demands for high reparations payments from Germany. After a brief return to the gold standard between 1928 and 1936, the currency was allowed to resume its slide, until in 1959 it was worth less than 2.5% of its 1934 value.

=== World War II ===
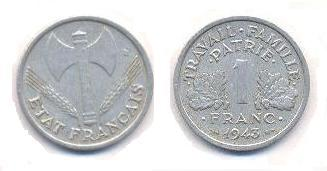
1 franc, Vichy regime

During the Nazi occupation of France (1940–1944), the franc was a satellite currency of the German Reichsmark. The exchange rate was 20 francs for 1 RM. The coins were changed, with the words Travail, famille, patrie (Work, Family, Fatherland) replacing the republican triad Liberté, égalité, fraternité (liberty, equality, fraternity), with the emblem of the Vichy regime added.

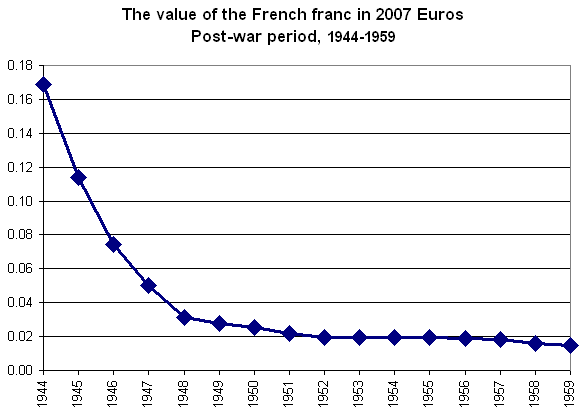
The value of the old French franc in the post-war period, in 2007 euros

After the liberation of France, the US attempted to impose the use of the US occupation franc, which was averted by General De Gaulle.

=== Post-War period ===
After World War II, France devalued its currency within the Bretton Woods system on several occasions. Beginning in 1945 at a rate of 480 francs to the British pound (119.1 to the U.S. dollar), by 1949 the rate was 980 to the pound (350 to the dollar). This was reduced further in 1957 and 1958, reaching 1382.3 to the pound (493.7 to the dollar, equivalent to 1 franc = 1.8 mg pure gold).

=== New franc ===
The value of the new French franc, in 2007 euros. Years shaded in light blue indicate fixed exchange rate to the euro.

In January 1960 the French franc was revalued, with 100 existing francs making one nouveau franc, also colloquially known as the "heavy franc" (franc lourd). The abbreviation "NF" was used on the 1958 design banknotes until 1963. Old one- and two-franc coins continued to circulate as new centimes (no new centimes were minted for the first two years). The one-centime coin never circulated widely. Inflation continued to erode the franc's value: between 1950 and 1960, price levels increased 72 per cent (5.7% per year on average); between 1960 and 1970, it increased 51 per cent (4.2%). Only one further major devaluation occurred (11% in August 1969) before the Bretton Woods system was replaced by free-floating exchange rates. When the euro replaced the franc on 1 January 1999, the franc was worth less than an eighth of its original 1960 purchasing power.

After revaluation and the introduction of the new franc, many French people continued to use the term "old francs" (anciens francs, AF) for large sums, for example for the prices of houses, apartments, and cars. This was common until the introduction of the euro and even later. Many people, old and young – even those who had never used the old franc – still quoted prices in old francs, confusing tourists and people abroad. For example, lottery prizes were most often advertised in amounts of centimes, equivalent to the old franc, to inflate the perceived value of the prizes at stake. Multiples of 10 NF were occasionally referred to as "mille francs" (one thousand francs) or "mille balles" ("balle" being a slang word for franc) in contexts where it was clear that the speaker did not mean 1,000 new francs. The expression "heavy franc" (franc lourd) was also commonly used to designate the new franc.

All franc coins and banknotes ceased to be legal tender in January 2002, upon the official adoption of the euro.

=== Economic and monetary union ===
From 1 January 1999, the value exchange rate of the French franc against the euro was set at a fixed parity of €1 = 6.55957 F. Euro coins and notes replaced the franc entirely between 1 January and 1 March 2002.

== Coins ==
=== Before World War I ===
French francs from the Consulship period

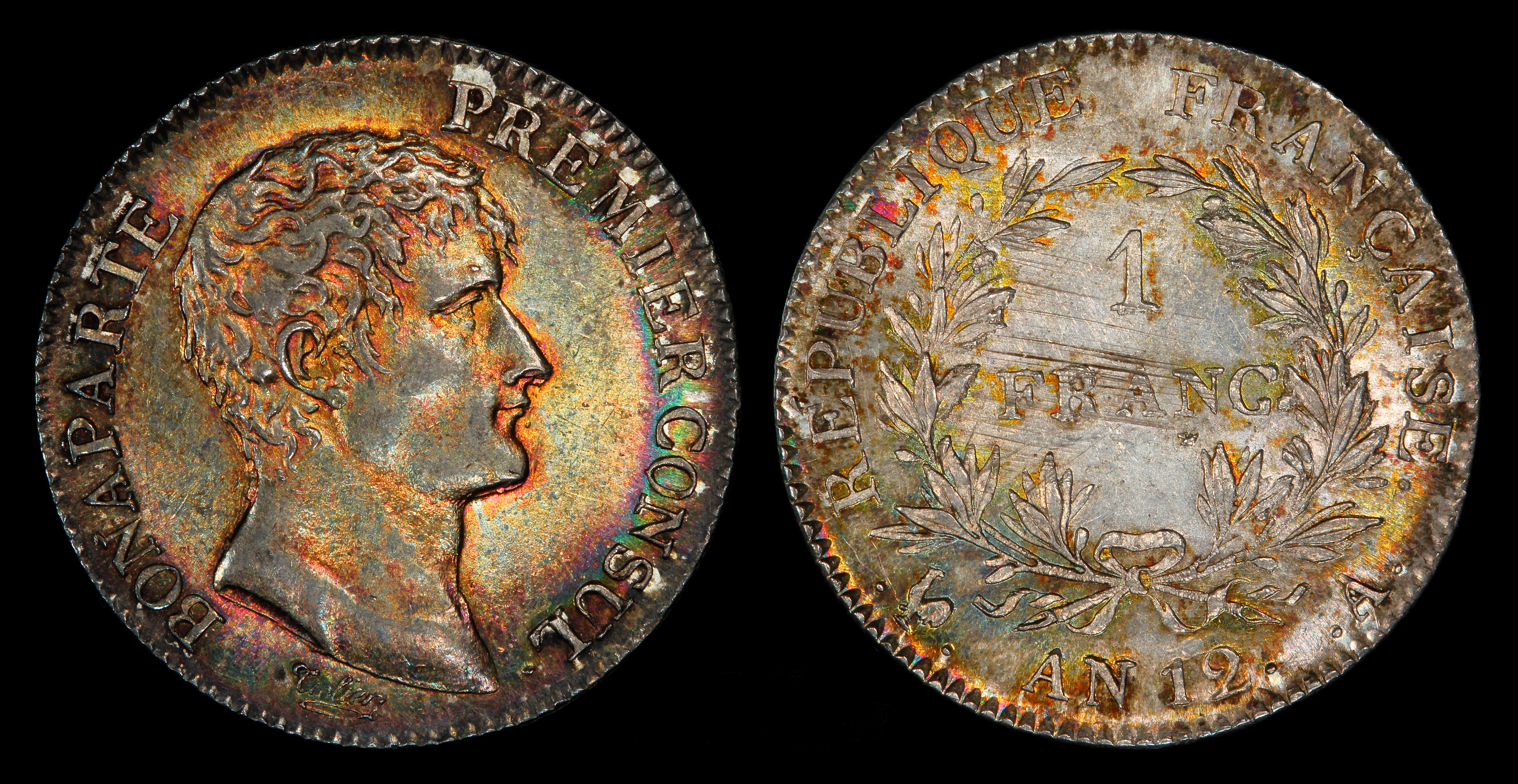
1803–04 one franc

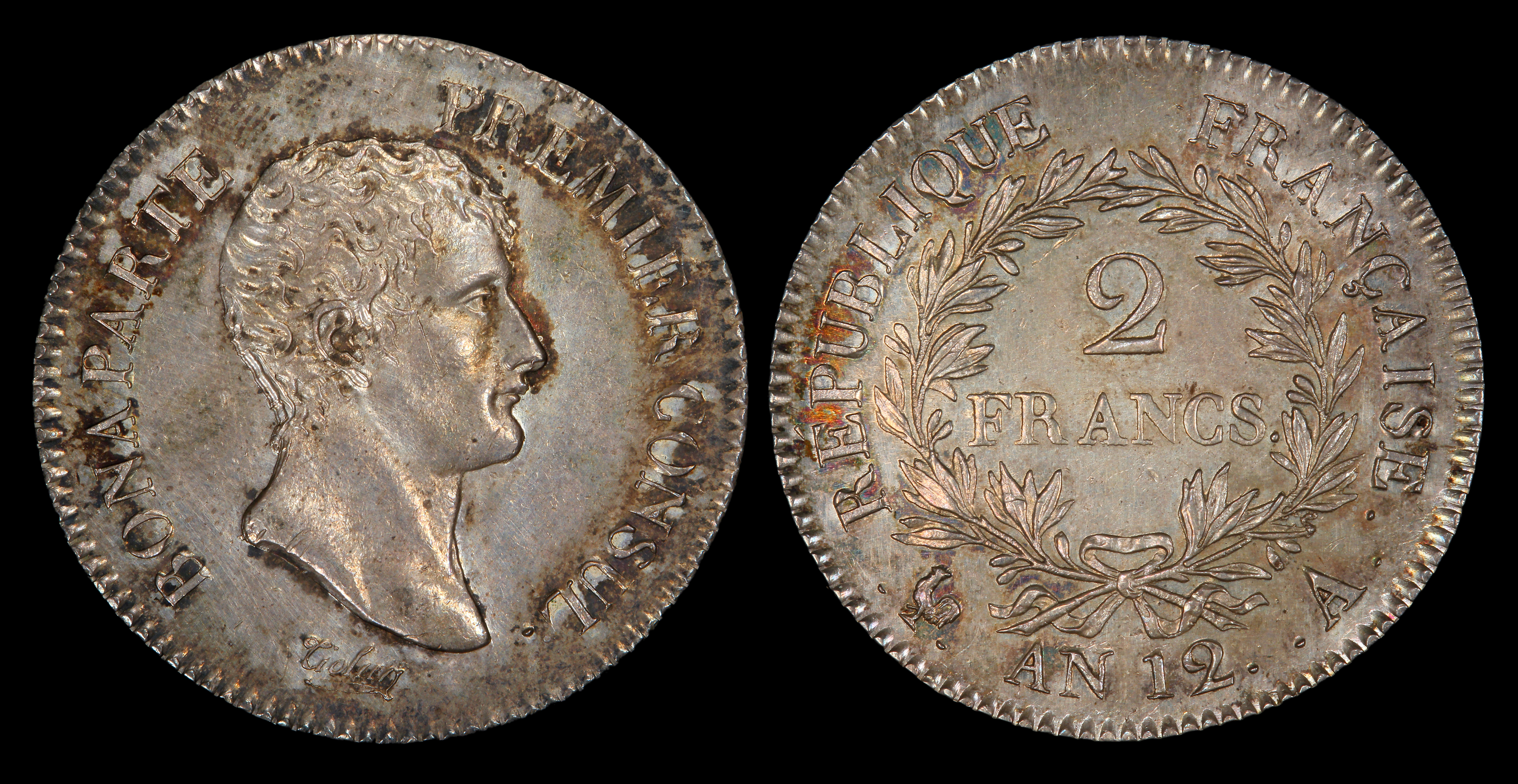
1803–04 two francs

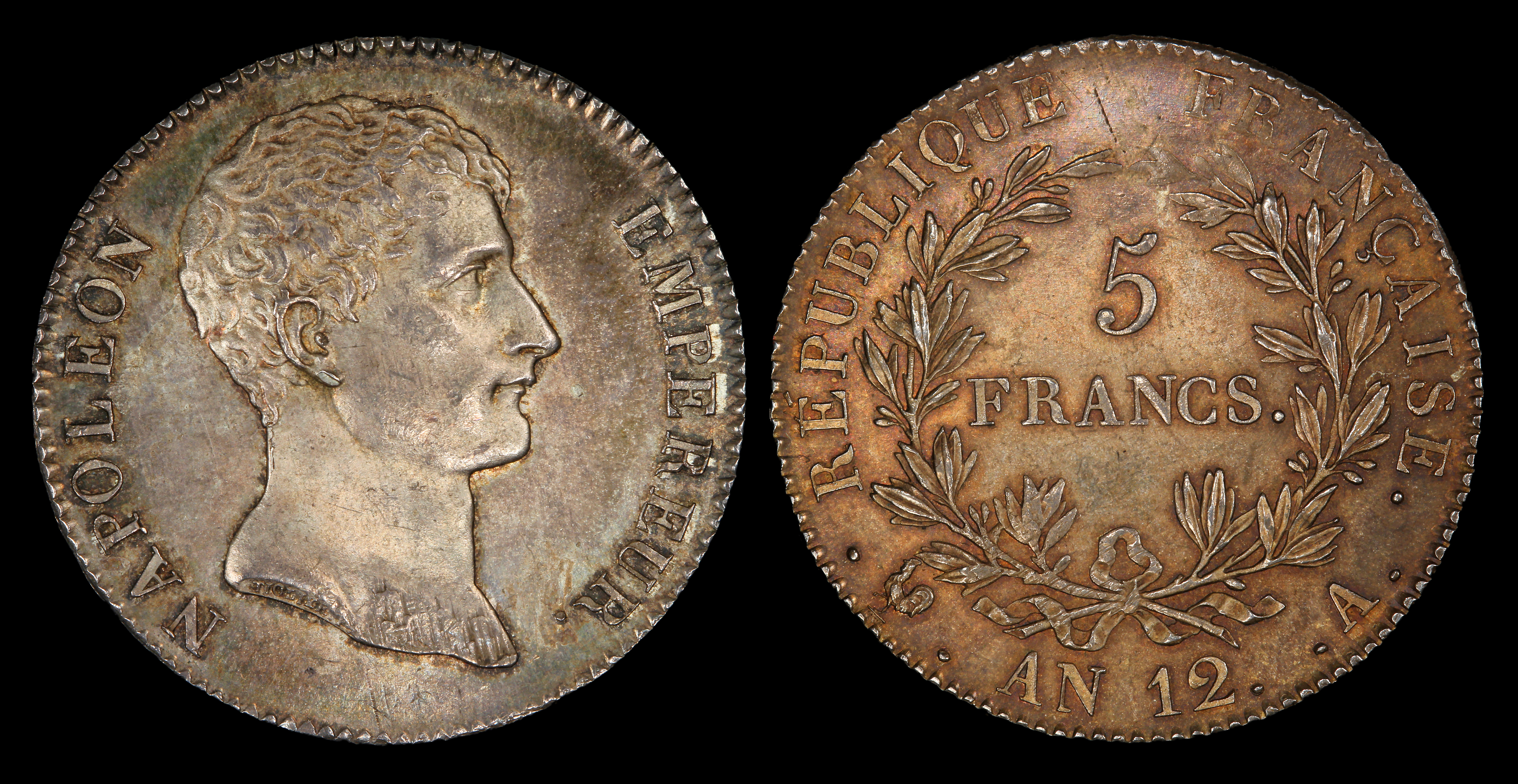
1803–04 five francs

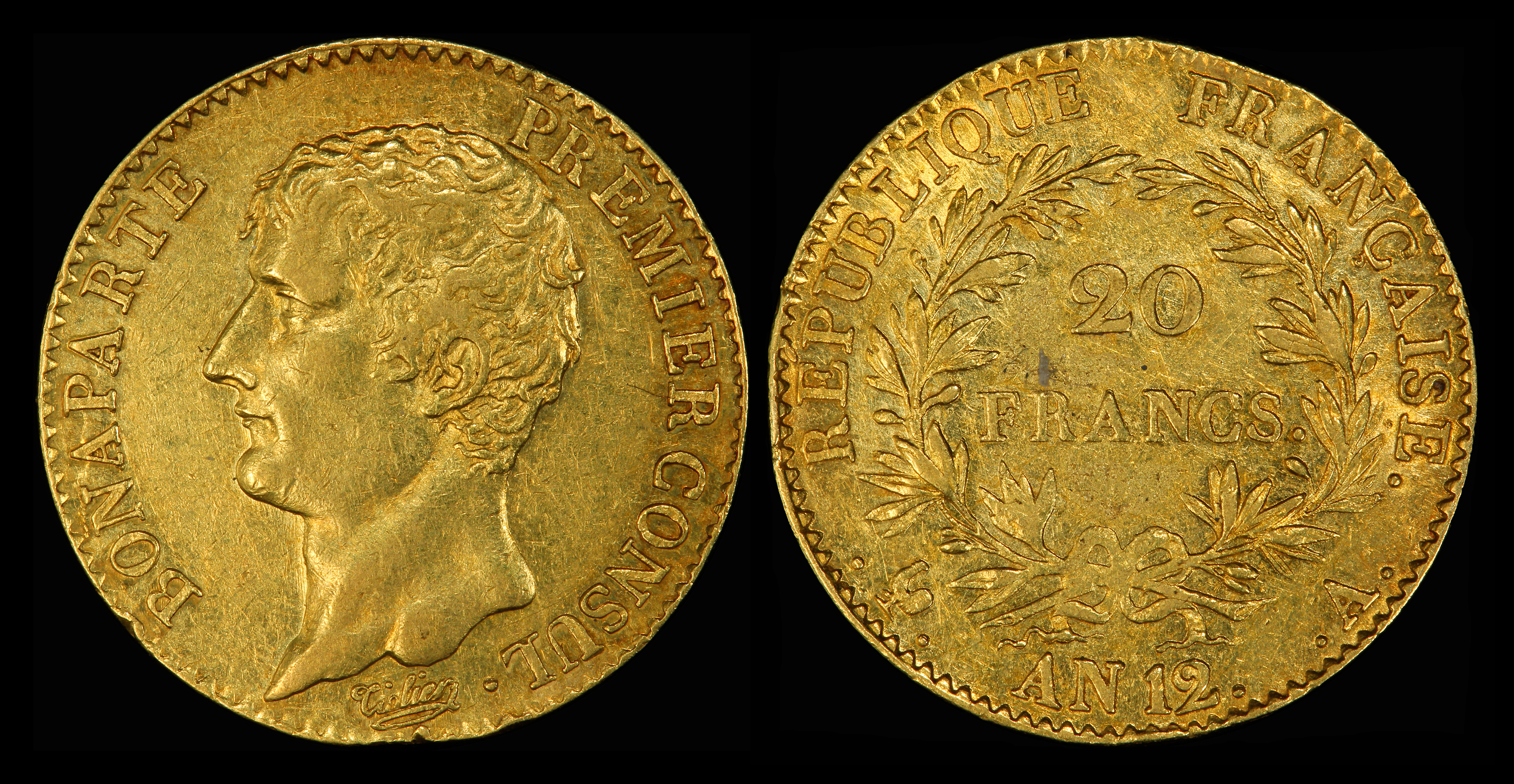
1803–04 gold 20 francs

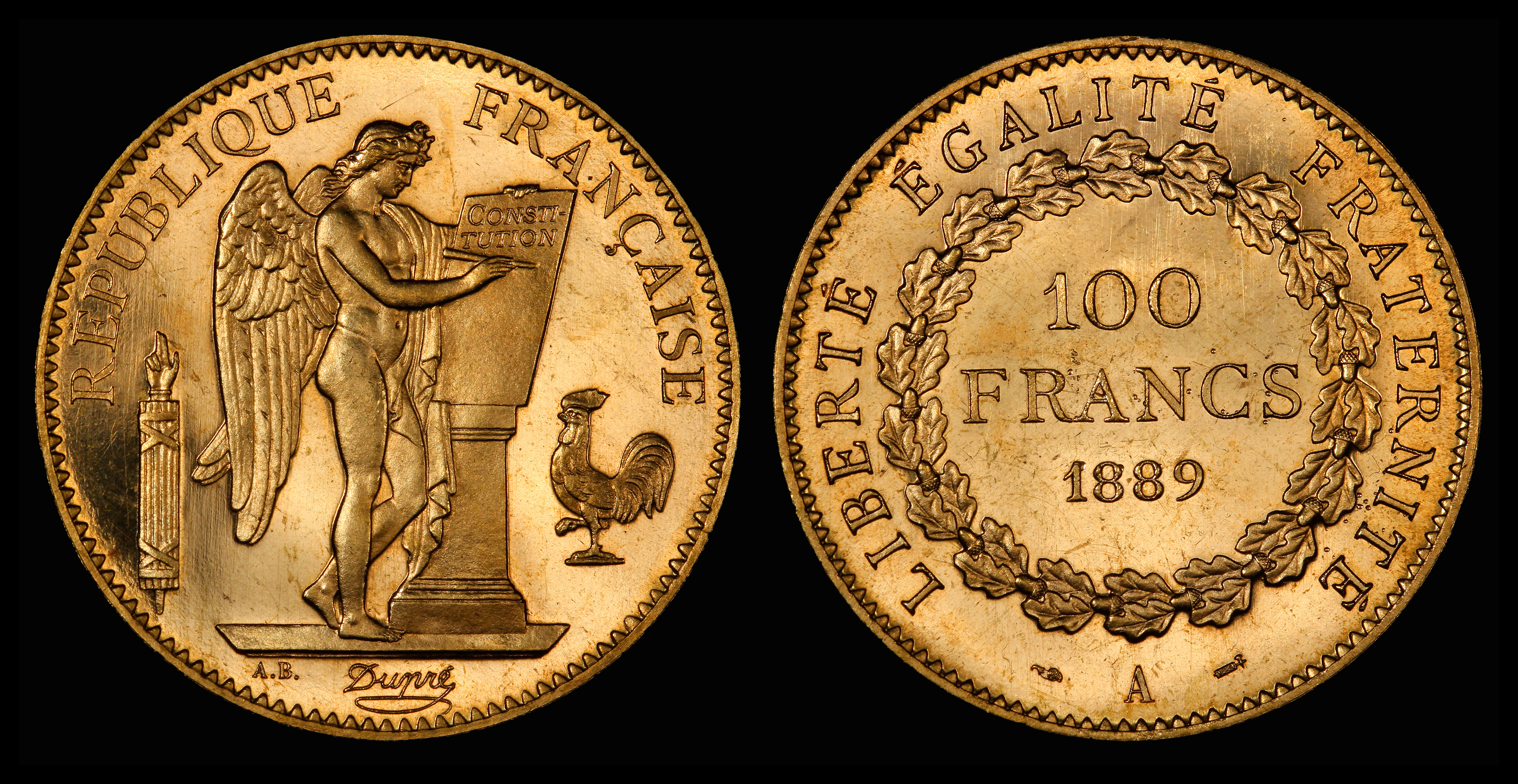
1889 proof gold 100 francs (only 100 struck)

In August 1795, the Monetary Law replaced the livre ("pound") with the franc, which was divided into 10 décimes ("tenths") and 100 centimes ("hundredths"). Copper coins were issued in the denominations of 1 centime, 5 centimes, 1 décime, and 2 décimes, designed by Augustin Dupré. After 1801, French copper coins became rare.

The 5-centime copper coin was called a sou, referring to "sole" (fr. Latin: solidus), until the 1920s.

An Imperial 10-décime coin was produced in billon from 1807 to 1810.

During the Consulship period (1799–1804) silver francs were struck in decimal coinage. A five-franc coin was first introduced in 1801–02 (L'AN 10), half-franc, one-franc, and gold 40-franc coins were introduced in 1802–03 (L'AN 11), and quarter-franc and two-franc coins in 1803–04 (L'AN 12).

The 5-franc silver coin was called an écu, after the six-livre silver coin of the ancien regime, until the 1880s.

Copper coins were rarely issued between 1801 and 1848, so the quarter franc was the lowest current denomination in circulation. But during this period, copper coins from earlier periods circulated. A Napoleon 5-centime coin (in bell metal) and Napoleon and Restoration 1-décime coins were minted.

Most pre-decimal silver was removed from circulation by 1834. Until they were also demonetized in 1845, 15- and 30-sou coins from 1791 to 1793 continued to circulate with a value of 0.75 and 1.50 francs, and 18th-century billon coins that had come to be known as "pièces de 6 liards" (originally issued with various values) were valued at 7.5 centimes.

A new bronze coinage was introduced from 1848. The Second Republic Monetary Authority minted a 1-centime copper coin with a 1795 design. 2, 5 and 10-centime coins were issued from 1853. The quarter franc was discontinued, with silver 20-centime coins issued between 1849 and 1868 as the smallest silver coin produced in France.

The gold coinage also changed. 40-franc coins were last struck in 1839 (with just 23 coins minted). Several new denomination were introduced as gold coinage: 5 gold francs (1856), 10 gold francs (1850), 50 gold francs (1855), and 100 gold francs (1855). A second design for the 100 gold franc coin was released in 1878 depicting standing genius writing the constitution. The pictured example (1889) was issued as a proof and only 100 coins were struck.

The last gold 5-franc pieces were minted in 1869, and silver 5-franc coins were last minted in 1878. After 1815, the 20-franc gold coin was called a "napoléon" (royalists still called this coin a "louis"), and so that is the colloquial term for this coin until the present. During the Belle Époque, the 100-franc gold coin was called a "monaco", referring to the flourishing casino business in Monte Carlo.

Nickel 25-centime coins were introduced in 1903.

=== World War I ===
World War I and the aftermath brought substantial changes to the coinage. Gold coinage was suspended and the franc was debased. Smaller, holed 5, 10, and 25-centime coins minted in nickel or cupro-nickel were introduced in 1914, finally replacing copper in 1921. In 1920, 1 and 2-centime coins were discontinued and production of silver coinage ceased, with aluminium-bronze 50-centime, 1-franc, and 2-franc coins introduced. Until 1929, these coins were issued by the chambers of commerce, bearing the phrase bon pour on it (meaning: "good for"). At the beginning of the 1920s, chambers of commerce also issued small change coins in aluminium. In 1929, the original franc germinal of 1795 was replaced by the franc Poincaré, which was valued at 20% of the 1803 gold standard.

In 1929, silver coins were reintroduced in 10-franc and 20-franc denominations. A very rare gold 100-franc coin was minted between 1929 and 1936.

In 1933, a nickel 5-franc coin was minted, but was soon replaced by a large aluminium-bronze 5-franc coin.

=== From World War II to the currency reform ===
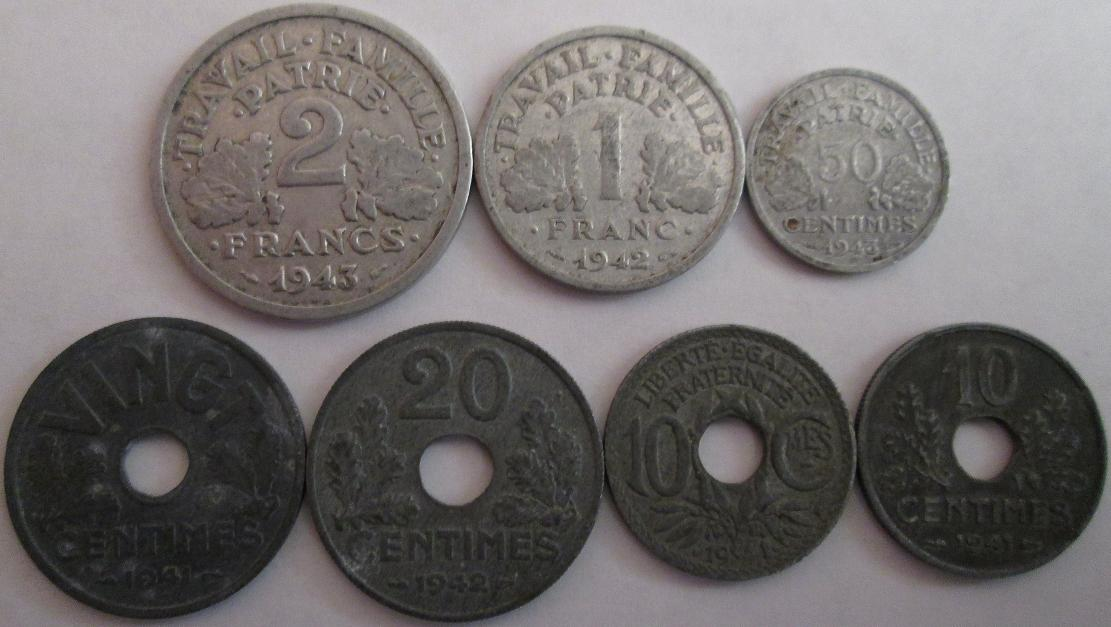
Vichy French zinc and aluminium coins made during World War II. These coins circulated in both Vichy France and the zone occupée.

The events of the Second World War also affected the coinage substantially. In 1941, aluminium replaced aluminium-bronze in the 50 centimes, and 1, 2, and 5 francs as copper and nickel were diverted into the War Effort. In 1942, following German occupation and the installation of the French Vichy State, a new, short lived series of coins was released which included holed 10 and 20 centimes in zinc. 50 centimes, and 1 and 2 francs were aluminium. In 1944 this series was discontinued and withdrawn and the previous issue was resumed.

Following the war, rapid inflation caused denominations below 1 franc to be withdrawn from circulation while 10 francs in copper nickel were introduced, followed by reduced size 10-franc coins in aluminium-bronze in 1950, along with 20 and 50-franc coins of the same composition. In 1954, copper-nickel 100 francs were introduced.

In the 1960s, 1 and 2 (old) franc aluminium coins were still circulating, used as "centimes".

Coins of the French franc ("Old franc (1795-1959) issue")
Image	Value	Technical parameters				Description			Date of first minting
Image	Value	Diameter	Thickness	Mass	Composition	Edge	Obverse	Reverse	Date of first minting
	1 centime	18 mm	0.9 mm	2 g	Copper	Plain/Smooth	Marianne; text "RÉPUBLIQUE FRANÇAISE", "Dupré"	Text "UN CENTIME"	1797
	1 centime	18 mm	0.9 mm	2 g	Bronze	Plain/Smooth	Marianne; text "RÉPUBLIQUE FRANÇAISE", "Dupré"	Text "UN CENTIME"	1848
	1 centime	15 mm	1 mm	1 g	Bronze	Plain/Smooth	Napoleon III; text "NAPOLEON III EMPEREUR"	Eagle; text "EMPIRE FRANÇAIS", "UN CENTIME"	1853
	1 centime	15 mm	0.8 mm	1 g	Bronze	Plain/Smooth	Ceres; text "RÉPUBLIQUE FRANÇAISE"	Text "LIBERTÉ ÉGALITÉ FRATERNITÉ"; "1 CENTIME"	1872
	1 centime	15 mm	0.8 mm	1 g	Bronze	Plain/Smooth	Head of Liberty	Text "LIBERTE EGALITE FRATERNITE"; "1 CENTIME"	1898
	2 centimes	20.2 mm	0.9 mm	2 g	Bronze	Plain/Smooth	Ceres; text "RÉPUBLIQUE FRANÇAISE"	Text "LIBERTE EGALITE FRATERNITE"; "2 CENTIMES"	1877
	2 centimes	20.2 mm	0.9 mm	2 g	Bronze	Plain/Smooth	Head of Liberty	Text "LIBERTE EGALITE FRATERNITE"; "2 CENTIMES"	1898
	5 centimes	23 mm	1.4 mm	5 g	Copper	Oblique reeded	Marianne; text "RÉPUBLIQUE FRANÇAISE", "Dupré"	Text "5 CENTIMES"	1795
	5 centimes	25 mm	1.3 mm	5 g	Bronze	Plain/Smooth	Head of Liberty	Allegory of the Republic protecting her child; text "LIBERTE EGALITE FRATERNITE"; "5 C"	1897
	5 centimes	19 mm	1.55 mm	3 g	Copper-nickel	Plain/Smooth	Monogram "RF" within a wreath divided by a center hole; liberty cap above	Text "LIBERTE EGALITE FRATERNITE"; "5 Cmes"	1917
	10 centimes (1 decime)	32 mm	3 mm	20 g	Copper	Patterned indentations	Head of Marianne; text "RÉPUBLIQUE FRANÇAISE", "Dupré"	Text "UN DÉCIME"	1795
	10 centimes	30.2 mm	1.6 mm	10 g	Bronze	Plain/Smooth	Napoleon III; text "NAPOLEON III EMPEREUR"	Eagle; text "EMPIRE FRANÇAIS", "DIX CENTIMES"	1852
	10 centimes	30 mm	1.4 mm	10 g	Bronze	Plain/Smooth	Head of Liberty; text "REPUBLIQUE FRANÇAISE"	Olive branch; text "LIBERTÉ ÉGALITÉ FRATERNITÉ"; "10 CENTIMES"	1870
	10 centimes	30 mm	1.9 mm	10 g	Bronze	Plain/Smooth	Head of Liberty; text "RÉPUBLIQUE FRANÇAISE"	Allegory of the Republic protecting her child; text "LIBERTE EGALITE FRATERNITE"; "10 C"	1897
	10 centimes	21.11 mm	1.9 mm	3.98 g	Nickel	Plain/Smooth	Monogram "RF" within a wreath divided by a center hole; liberty cap above	Text "LIBERTE EGALITE FRATERNITE"; "10 Cmes"	1917
	20 centimes	24 mm	2	3 g	Zinc	Reeded	Monogram "RF" within a wreath divided by a center hole; liberty cap above	Text "LIBERTE EGALITE FRATERNITE"; "20 Cmes"	1945
	25 centimes	24 mm	1.9 mm	7 g	Nickel	Plain/Smooth	Laureate head of Liberty; text RÉPUBLIQUE FRANÇAISE	Text "LIBERTE EGALITE FRATERNITE"; "25 CENTIMES"	1903
	25 centimes	24 mm	1.9 mm	7 g	Nickel	Plain/Smooth	Laureate head of Liberty; text RÉPUBLIQUE FRANÇAISE	Axe with branches; text "25 CENTIMES"	1904
	25 centimes	24 mm	1.9 mm	7 g	Nickel	Plain/Smooth	Monogram "RF" within a wreath divided by a center hole; liberty cap above	Text "LIBERTE EGALITE FRATERNITE"; "25 Cmes"	1914
	50 centimes	18.2 mm	1.10 mm	2.5 g	.835 Silver	Reeded	La Semeuse ("The Sower"; 1897) by Louis-Oscar Roty: A woman (model: Charlotte Ragot) wearing Phrygian cap of liberty, sowing seeds with the sunrise in the background; (Note: A continuation of the Ceres agricultural theme of coins of the 2nd Republic, as well as the revolutionary theme of Marianne wearing the liberty cap) text RÉPUBLIQUE FRANÇAISE	Olive branch; text "50 CENTIMES"	1897
	50 centimes	18 mm	1.23 mm	2 g	Copper-aluminium	Plain/Smooth	Marianne; text RÉPUBLIQUE FRANÇAISE	Text "LIBERTE EGALITE FRATERNITE"; "50 CENTIMES"	1931
	1 franc	23 mm	1 mm	5 g	.835 Silver	Reeded	Ceres; text "RÉPUBLIQUE FRANÇAISE"	Olive branch; text "LIBERTE EGALITE FRATERNITE", "1 FRANC"	1871
	1 franc	23 mm	1.40 mm	5 g	.835 Silver	Reeded	La Semeuse ("The Sower"); text RÉPUBLIQUE FRANÇAISE	Olive branch; text "1 FRANC"	1898
	1 franc	23 mm	1.70 mm	4 g	Copper-aluminium	Plain/Smooth	Marianne; text RÉPUBLIQUE FRANÇAISE	Text "LIBERTE EGALITE FRATERNITE"; "1 FRANC"	1931
	2 francs	27 mm	2 mm	10 g	.835 Silver	Reeded	La Semeuse ("The Sower"); text RÉPUBLIQUE FRANÇAISE	Olive branch; text "2 FRANCS"	1898
	2 francs	27 mm	2.14 mm	8 g	Copper-aluminium	Plain/Smooth	Marianne; text RÉPUBLIQUE FRANÇAISE	Text "LIBERTE EGALITE FRATERNITE"; "2 FRANCS"	1931
	5 francs	37 mm	2.6 mm	25 g	.900 Silver	Plain/Lettered (★ DIEU ★ PROTEGE ★ LA ★ FRANCE)	Napoleon III; text "NAPOLEON III EMPEREUR", "BARRE"	Coat of arms; text "5F", "EMPIRE FRANÇAIS"	1861
	5 francs	37 mm	2.6 mm	25 g	.900 Silver	Plain/Lettered (★ DIEU ★ PROTEGE ★ LA ★ FRANCE)	Hercules group; text LIBERTÉ ÉGALITÉ FRATERNITÉ	Text "RÉPUBLIQUE FRANÇAISE"; "5 FRANCS"	1870
	5 francs	31 mm	2.1 mm	12 g	Nickel	Plain/Smooth	Laureate head; text REPUBLIQVE FRANÇAISE	Monogram "RF"; text "5 FRANCS"	1933
	10 francs	19 mm	0.8 mm	3.2258 g	.900 Gold	Reeded	Head of Marianne; text REPUBLIQUE FRANÇAISE	Cockerel; text LIBERTE · EGALITE · FRATERNITE; "10 Fcs"	1899
	10 francs	28 mm	2.01 mm	10 g	.680 Silver	Reeded	Laureate head; text REPUBLIQUE FRANÇAISE	Ears of wheat; text "10 FRANCS"; LIBERTE EGALITE FRATERNITE	1929
	10 francs	20 mm	1.64 mm	3 g	Copper-aluminium	Plain/Smooth	Marianne wearing the tricolor cockade of France; text REPUBLIQUE FRANÇAISE	Cockerel; laurel branch; text "10 FRANCS"; LIBERTE EGALITE FRATERNITE	1950
	20 francs	21 mm	1.3 mm	6.45 g	.900 Gold	Plain/Lettered (*++* DIEU *+ PROTEGE+* LA FRANCE)	Marianne; text REPUBLIQUE FRANÇAISE	Cockerel; text LIBERTE · EGALITE · FRATERNITE ·; 20 Fcs	1898
	20 francs	35 mm	2.44 mm	20 g	.680 Silver	Reeded	Laureate head; text REPUBLIQUE FRANÇAISE	Ears of wheat; text "20 FRANCS"; LIBERTE EGALITE FRATERNITE	1929
	20 francs	23.50 mm	1.66 mm	4 g	Copper-aluminium	Plain/Smooth	Female head; text REPUBLIQUE FRANÇAISE	Cockerel; laurel branch; text "20 FRANCS"; LIBERTE EGALITE FRATERNITE	1950
	50 francs	28 mm		16.12903 g	.900 Gold	Plain/Lettered (DIEU PROTEGE LA FRANCE)	Genius of Liberty writing a tablet; text "CONSTITUTION"; "REPUBLIQUE FRANÇAISE"	Oak wreath; text "LIBERTÉ ÉGALITÉ FRATERNITÉ"; "50 FRANCS"	1878
	50 francs	27 mm	2.24 mm	8 g	Copper-aluminium	Plain/Smooth	Female head; text REPUBLIQUE FRANÇAISE	Cockerel; laurel branch; text "50 FRANCS"; LIBERTE EGALITE FRATERNITE	1950
	100 francs	35 mm	2.3 mm	32.25806 g	.900 Gold	Plain/Lettered (DIEU PROTEGE LA FRANCE)	Genius of Liberty writing a tablet; text "CONSTITUTION"; "REPUBLIQUE FRANÇAISE"	Oak wreath; text "LIBERTÉ ÉGALITÉ FRATERNITÉ"; "100 FRANCS"	1878
	100 francs	21 mm		6.55 g	.900 Gold	Plain/Lettered (**LIBERTE * ÉGALITÉ * FRATERNITÉ)	Liberty wearing a winged Phrygian cap decorated with a cockade; text "REPUBLIQUE FRANÇAISE"	Ear of corn, an olive branch and an oak branch; text "100 FRANCS"	1935
	100 francs	24 mm	1.85 mm	6 g	Copper-nickel	Reeded	Bust of Liberty holding a torch; text "REPUBLIQUE FRANÇAISE"	Olive branch and wheat; text "LIBERTE EGALITE FRATERNITE"; "100 FRANCS"	1954

=== New franc ===
In 1960, the new franc (nouveau franc) was introduced, worth 100 old francs. Stainless steel 1 and 5 centimes, aluminium-bronze 10, 20, and 50 centimes, nickel 1 franc and silver 5 francs were introduced. Silver 10-franc coins were introduced in 1965, followed by a new, smaller aluminium-bronze 5-centime and a smaller nickel 1/2-franc coin in 1966.

A first attempt to introduce a nickel 2-franc coin in 1960 failed.

Nickel-clad copper-nickel 5-franc and nickel-brass 10-franc coins replaced their silver counterparts in 1970 and 1974, respectively. Nickel 2 francs were finally introduced in 1979, followed by bimetallic 10 francs in 1988 and trimetallic 20 francs in 1992. The 20-franc coin was composed of two rings and a centre plug.

20 Centime with Marianne on Obverse.
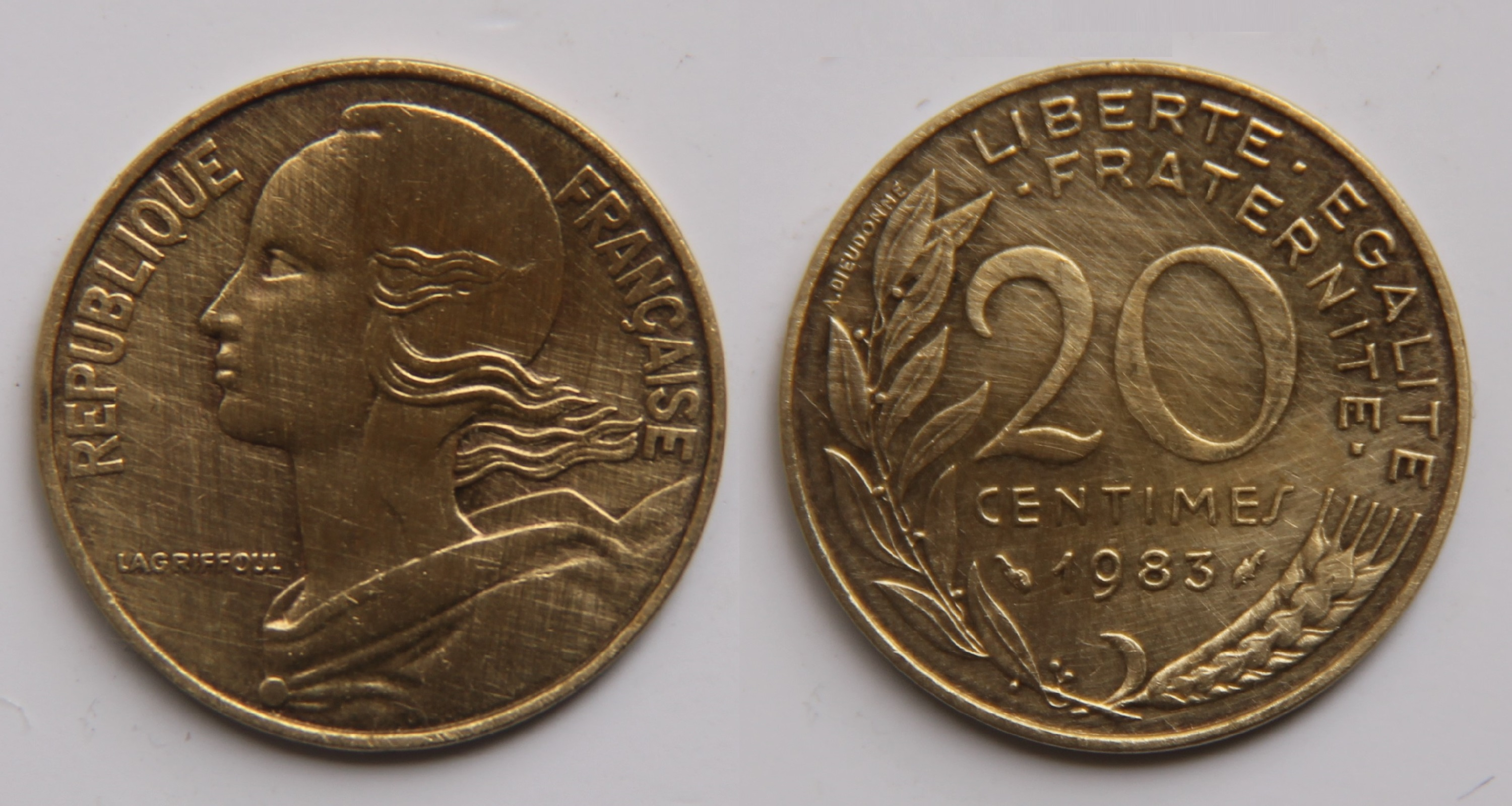
First side of the image: Obverse: Marianne wearing the Phrygian cap of liberty
Second side of the image: Reverse: Face value and French motto: "Liberté, égalité, fraternité"
This coin was minted from 1962 to 2001.

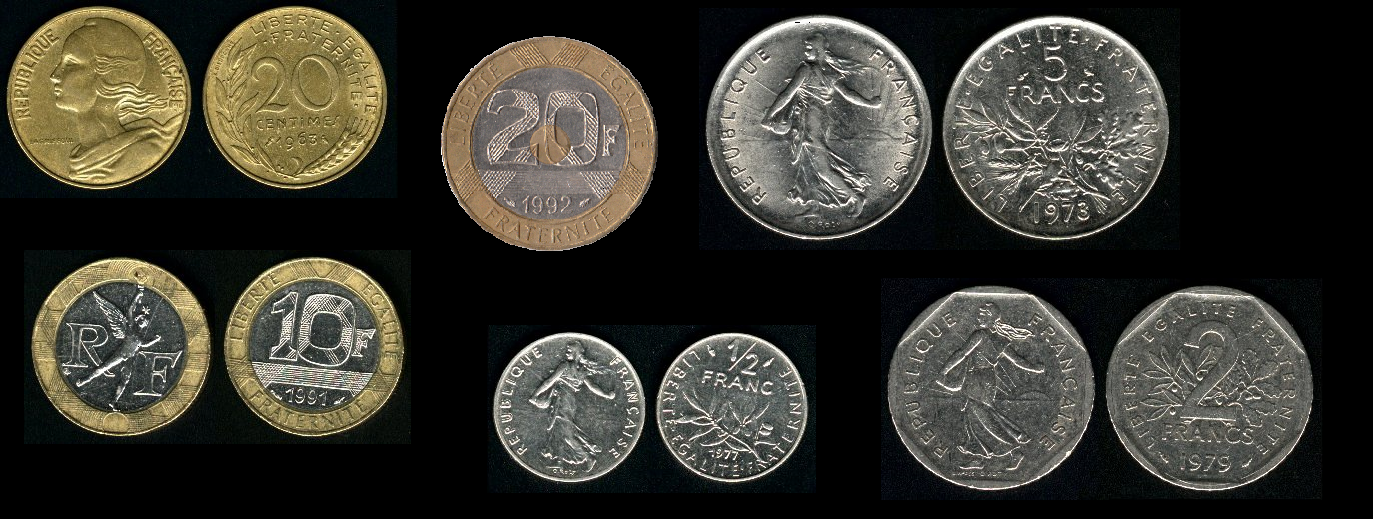
French franc coins (1960–1999)

A nickel 10-franc piece was issued on 22 October 1986, in an attempt to increase usability, reduce counterfeiting, and make it easier for vending machines to recognise. While 120 million were released into circulation, circulation was halted on 26 November due to confusion with the half-franc and an unpopular design. The coin was subsequently withdrawn on 19 December and became demonetized at the end of June the next year. This led to the conception of the later bimetallic model. The aluminium-bronze pieces continued to circulate until the bimetallic pieces were developed and additional aluminium-bronze coins were minted to replace those initially withdrawn. Once the bimetallic coins were circulating and produced in necessary quantities, the aluminium-bronze pieces were gradually withdrawn and demonetized.

A .900 silver 50-franc piece was issued from 1974 to 1980, known as the largest silver coin ever minted in France, (due to its face value in accordance to its size) but was withdrawn and demonetized after the price of silver spiked in 1980. Then, in 1982, a 100-franc piece, also in .900 silver, was issued, and circulated to a small extent, until the introduction of the euro.

All French franc coins were demonetized in 2005 and are no longer redeemable at the Banque de France.

At the time of the complete changeover to the euro on 1 January 2002, coins in circulation (some produced as recently as 2000) were:

- 1 centime (~ 0.15 euro cents) stainless steel, rarely circulated (last production stopped first in 1982, then in 1987 due to high production cost, and lack of demand due to its very low value).
- 5 centimes (~ 0.76 cents) aluminium-bronze
- 10 centimes (~ 1.52 cents) aluminium-bronze
- 20 centimes (~ 3.05 cents) aluminium-bronze
- 1/2 franc (~ 7.6 cents) nickel
- 1 franc (~ 15.2 cents) nickel
- 2 francs (~ 30.5 cents) nickel
- 5 francs (~ 76 cents) nickel-clad copper-nickel
- 10 francs (~ €1.52) bimetallic
- 20 francs (~ €3.05) trimetallic, rarer (produced for a short period before the euro, the banknote equivalent was much more frequently used)
- 100 francs (~ €15.24) silver, rarely circulated (most often bought and offered as personal gifts, but rare in commercial transactions, now worth more than its face value).

Last circulating coins
Image		Value	Euro equi.	Technical parameters			Description			Issued from
Obverse	Reverse	Value	Euro equi.	Diameter (mm)	Mass (g)	Composition	Edge	Obverse	Reverse	Issued from
		1 c	€0.001	15.00	1.65	Stainless steel	Smooth	Wheat; Lettering: République Française	Value; year of issue	1960–2001
		5 c	€0.01	17.00	2.00	Aluminium bronze	Smooth	Marianne (Henri Lagriffoul); Lettering: République Française	Olive branch, wheat ear; Value; year of issue; Lettering: Liberté, Egalité, Fraternité	1966–2001
		10 c	€0.02	20.00	3.00	Aluminium bronze	Smooth	Marianne (Henri Lagriffoul); Lettering: République Française	Olive branch, wheat ear; Value; year of issue; Lettering: Liberté, Egalité, Fraternité	1962–2001
		20 c	€0.03	23.50	4.00	Aluminium bronze	Smooth	Marianne (Henri Lagriffoul); Lettering: République Française	Olive branch, wheat ear; Value; year of issue; Lettering: Liberté, Egalité, Fraternité	1962–2001
		1/2 F	€0.08	19.50	4.50	Nickel	Reeded	La Semeuse (Louis-Oscar Roty); Lettering: République Française	Olive branch; Value; year of issue; Lettering: Liberté, Egalité, Fraternité	1965–2001
		1 F	€0.15	24.00	6.00	Nickel	Reeded	La Semeuse (Louis-Oscar Roty); Lettering: République Française	Olive branch; Value; year of issue; Lettering: Liberté, Egalité, Fraternité	1960–2001
		2 F	€0.31	26.60	7.50	Nickel	Reeded	La Semeuse (Louis-Oscar Roty); Lettering: République Française	Olive branch; Value; year of issue; Lettering: Liberté, Egalité, Fraternité	1979–2001
		5 F	€0.76	29.00	10.00	Nickel-clad cupronickel	Reeded	La Semeuse (Louis-Oscar Roty); Lettering: République Française	Olive and oak branch, wheat ear; Value; year of issue; Lettering: Liberté, Egalité, Fraternité	1970–2001
		10 F	€1.52	23.50	6.50	Outer: Aluminium bronze	Interrupted reeding	Le Génie de la Liberté; Lettering: RF	Value; year of issue; Lettering: Liberté, Egalité, Fraternité	1988–2001
		10 F	€1.52	23.50	6.50	Inner: Nickel	Interrupted reeding	Le Génie de la Liberté; Lettering: RF	Value; year of issue; Lettering: Liberté, Egalité, Fraternité	1988–2001
		20 F	€3.05	27.00	9.00	Outer: Aluminium bronze	Interrupted reeding	Mont-Saint-Michel; Lettering: République Française	Value; year of issue; Lettering: Liberté, Egalité, Fraternité	1992–2001
		20 F	€3.05	27.00	9.00	Inner: Nickel	Interrupted reeding	Mont-Saint-Michel; Lettering: République Française	Value; year of issue; Lettering: Liberté, Egalité, Fraternité	1992–2001
		20 F	€3.05	27.00	9.00	Plug: Aluminium bronze	Interrupted reeding	Mont-Saint-Michel; Lettering: République Française	Value; year of issue; Lettering: Liberté, Egalité, Fraternité	1992–2001

=== Euro exchange ===
Coins were freely exchangeable until 17 February 2005 at Banque de France only (commercial banks were not required to accept the old coins after the transition period in 2002, but some did), by converting their total value in francs to euros (rounded to the nearest cent) at the fixed rate of 6.55957 francs for 1 euro. Banknotes remained convertible up until 17 February 2012. By that date, franc notes worth some €550 million remained unexchanged, allowing the French state to register the corresponding sum as revenue.

== Banknotes ==
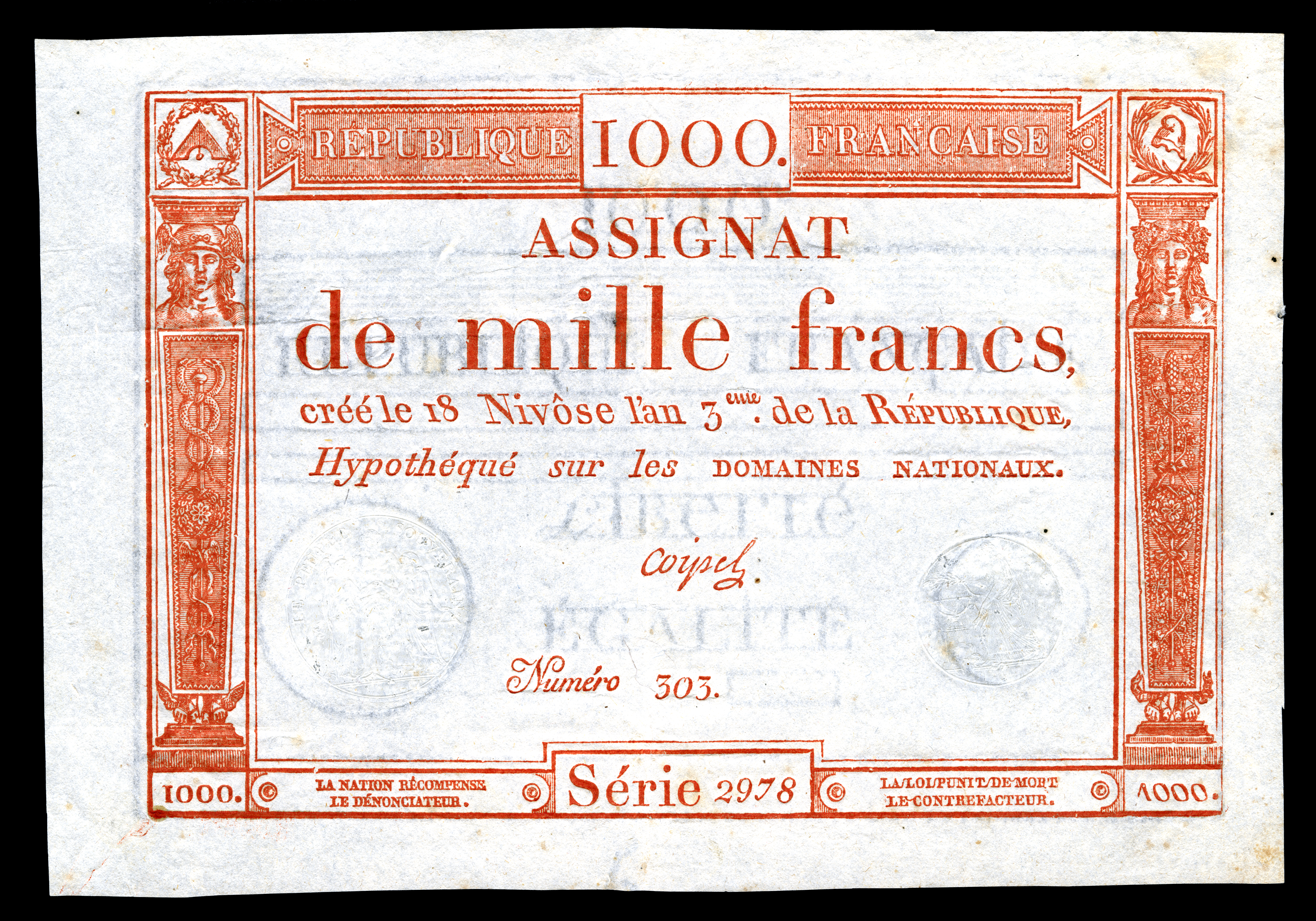
République Française – 1000 francs (1795)

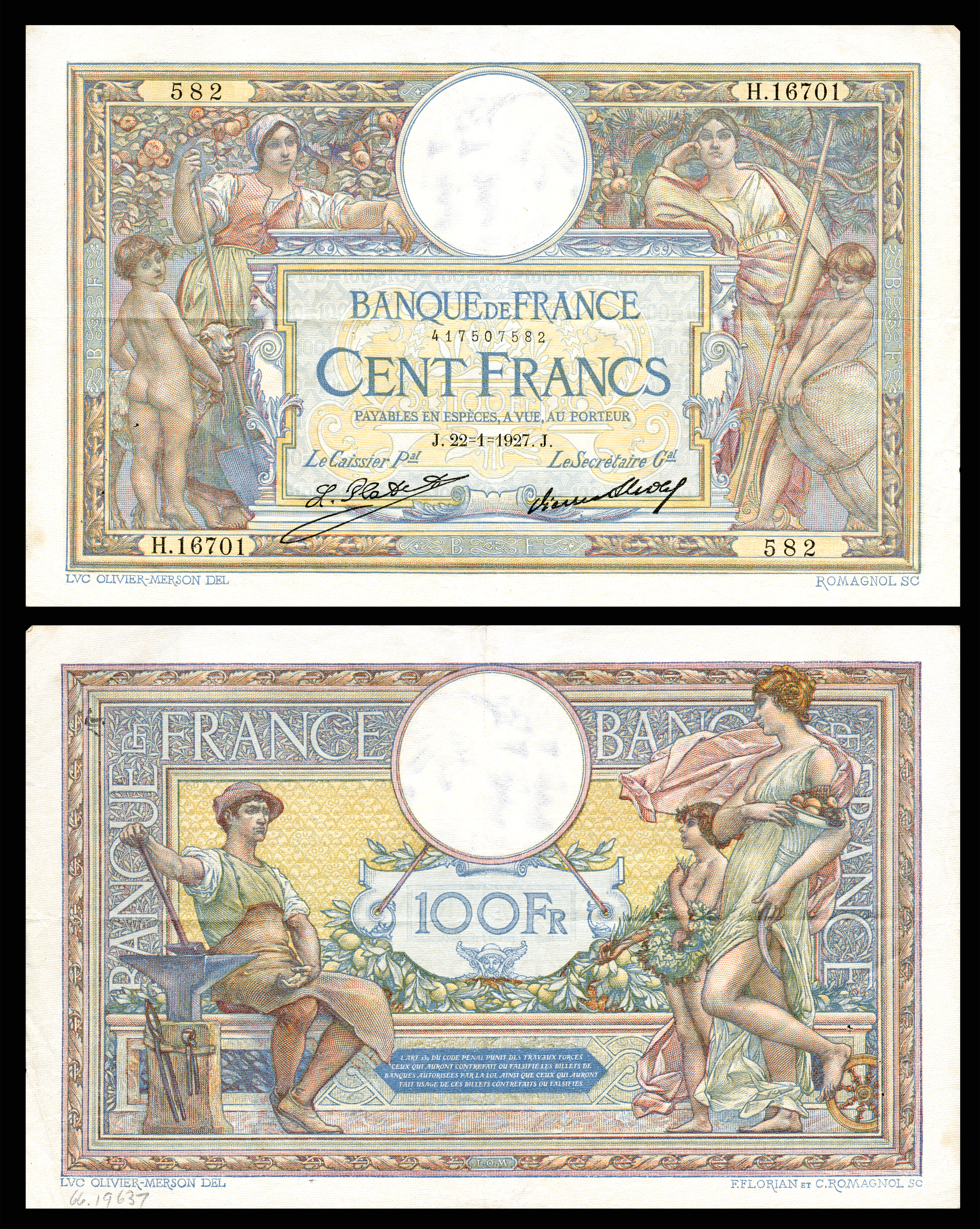
Banque de France – 100 francs (1927)

The first franc paper money issues were made in 1795. They were assignats in denominations between 100 and 10,000 francs. These followed in 1796 by "territorial mandate promises" for 25 up to 500 francs. The treasury also issued notes that year for 25 up to 1000 francs.

In 1800, the Bank of France began issuing notes, first in denominations of 500 and 1000 francs. In the late 1840s, 100 and 200-franc notes were added, while 5, 20 and 50 francs were added in the 1860s and 70s, although the 200-franc note was discontinued.

The First World War saw the introduction of 10 and 1000-franc notes. The chambers of commerce's notgeld ("money of necessity"), from 1918 to 1926, produced 25c, 50c, 1 F, 2 F, 5 F, and 10 F notes.

Despite base-metal 5, 10 and 20 F coins being introduced between 1929 and 1933, the banknotes were not removed. In 1938, the first 5000-franc notes were added.

In 1944, the liberating Allies introduced dollar-like paper money in denominations between 2 and 1000 francs, as well as a brass 2-franc coin.

After the Second World War, 5, 10 and 20-franc notes were replaced by coins in 1950, as were the 50- and 100-franc notes in the mid-1950s. In 1954, the 10,000-franc notes were introduced.

In 1959, banknotes in circulation when the old franc was replaced by the new franc were:

- 500 francs: Victor Hugo
- 1000 francs: Cardinal de Richelieu
- 5000 francs: Henri IV
- 10,000 francs: Bonaparte 1st consul

The first issue of the new franc consisted of 500, 1000, 5000 and 10,000-franc notes overprinted with their new denominations of 5, 10, 50 and 100 new francs. This issue was followed by notes of the same design but with only the new denomination shown. A 500-new franc note was also introduced in 1960 representing Molière, replaced in 1969 by the yellow Pascal type (colloquially called a pascal). A 5-franc note was issued until 1970 and a 10-franc note (showing Hector Berlioz) was issued until 1979.

From 1992 until 1998, a series of redesigned banknotes by Roger Pfund was issued, to be the last notes before the introduction of the euro. Banknotes in circulation when the franc was replaced were:

- 20 francs (€3.05): Claude Achille Debussy – brown-purple (introduced 1983)
- 50 francs (€7.62): Antoine de Saint-Exupéry – blue (introduced 20 October 1993, replacing Maurice Quentin de la Tour)
- 100 francs (€15.24): Paul Cézanne – orange (introduced 15 December 1997, replacing Eugène Delacroix and originally intended to feature Gustave Eiffel)
- 200 francs (€30.49): Gustave Eiffel – red (introduced 29 October 1996, replacing Montesquieu and originally intended to depict the Lumière brothers)
- 500 francs (€76.22): Pierre and Marie Curie – green (introduced 22 March 1995, replacing Blaise Pascal)

Banknotes current at changeover to the Euro could be exchanged at the French central bank or other services until 17 February 2012.

Most older series banknotes were exchangeable for 10 years from date of withdrawal. As the last banknote from the previous series was withdrawn on 1 February 1999 (100 francs, Delacroix), the deadline for its exchange was 31 January 2009.

=== 1969–1982 issue ===
Image		Value	Euro equivalent	Dimensions (mm)	Description		Date of	
Obverse	Reverse	Value	Euro equivalent	Dimensions (mm)	Obverse	Reverse	issue	withdrawal
		10 F	€1.52	140 × 75	Hector Berlioz, Les Invalides	Berlioz, Villa Medici	23 November 1972	15 September 1986
		20 F	€3.05	140 × 75	Claude Debussy, La Mer	Debussy, Pelléas et Mélisande	6 October 1981	17 February 2002
		50 F	€7.62	150 × 80	Maurice Quentin de la Tour, Palace of Versailles	Quentin de la Tour, Hôtel de Ville	4 April 1977	30 November 1995
		100 F	€15.24	160 × 85	Eugène Delacroix, Liberty Leading the People	Delacroix, Place Furstenberg, Paris	2 August 1979	1 February 1999
		200 F	€30.49	172 × 92	Montesquieu, Justicia	Montesquieu, Château de la Brède	7 July 1982	1 April 1998
		500 F	€76.22	180 × 97	Blaise Pascal, St. Jacques tower, Paris	Pascal, Port-Royal-des-Champs	7 January 1969	1 March 1997

=== 1993–1998 issue ===
Image		Value	Euro equivalent	Dimensions (mm)	Main colour	Description		Date of	
Obverse	Reverse	Value	Euro equivalent	Dimensions (mm)	Main colour	Obverse	Reverse	printing	issue
		50 F	€7.62	123 x 80	Blue	Antoine de Saint-Exupéry	Breguet 14 biplane	1992, 1993, 1994, 1996, 1997, 1999	20 October 1993
		100 F	€15.24	133 x 80	Orange	Paul Cézanne	Fruit by Cézanne	1997; 1998	15 December 1997
		200 F	€30.49	143 x 80	Red	Gustave Eiffel	Base of the Eiffel Tower	1995, 1996, 1997, 1999	29 October 1996
		500 F	€76.22	153 x 80	Green	Marie Curie; Pierre Curie	Laboratory utensils	1994, 1995, 1996, 1998, 2000	22 March 1995

== De facto currency ==
Along with the Spanish peseta, the French franc was also a de facto currency used in Andorra (which had no national currency with legal tender). It circulated alongside the Monégasque franc in Monaco, with which it had equal value. These currencies were all replaced by the euro in 2002.

== See also ==
- Adoption of the euro in France
- French euro coins
- Economy of France
- Napoléon (coin)
- Evolution of stamp prices in France

== Notes ==
New franc
Preceded by: Old franc Ratio: 1 new franc = 100 old francs	Currency of France; 1960 – 2002	Succeeded by: Euro; Reason: deployment of euro cash Ratio: 1 euro = 6.55957 francs
