= Livre parisis =

Medieval French coin

The livre parisis (French: [livʁ paʁizi]; lit. 'Paris pound'), also known as the Paris or Parisian livre, was a medieval French coin and unit of account originally notionally equivalent to a French pound of silver. It was the chief currency of the Capetian dynasty before being generally replaced by the livre tournois ("Tours pound") under Philip II in the 13th century. Louis IX ceased minting it and it was finally abolished as a unit of account by Louis XIV in 1667.

== Subdivision ==
Following the usual system of medieval Western Europe, the Paris livre was divided into 20 Paris sols (sols parisis) based on the Roman solidus or 240 Paris deniers (deniers parisis) based on the Roman denarius, 12 deniers to each sol.

== History ==
The Paris livre was the official currency of the Capetian dynasty of France, but certain other regions of the country had the right to mint their own coins and used their own standards to do so. Philip II captured Tours and the surrounding County of Anjou from England in 1203. Although the Parisian coins were notionally worth 125% of their Tournais counterparts, (Note: Thus, in theory, the Parisian livre was worth 25 Tours sols or 300 Tours deniers and the Parisian sol was worth 15 Tours deniers. After France's 1262 monetary reform, this set its notional value at 101.1 grams or 3.57 ounces of fine silver.) the Tours livre quickly outstripped the less stable Parisian currency as a unit of account in his realms. Louis IX ceased minting the Paris livre but it continued to be used for accounting purposes in the area around Paris until its use was fully abolished by Louis XIV in 1667.

== See also ==
- French livre
